= Abdul Hamid II =

Sultan of the Ottoman Empire from 1876 to 1909

- Custodian of the Two Holy Mosques
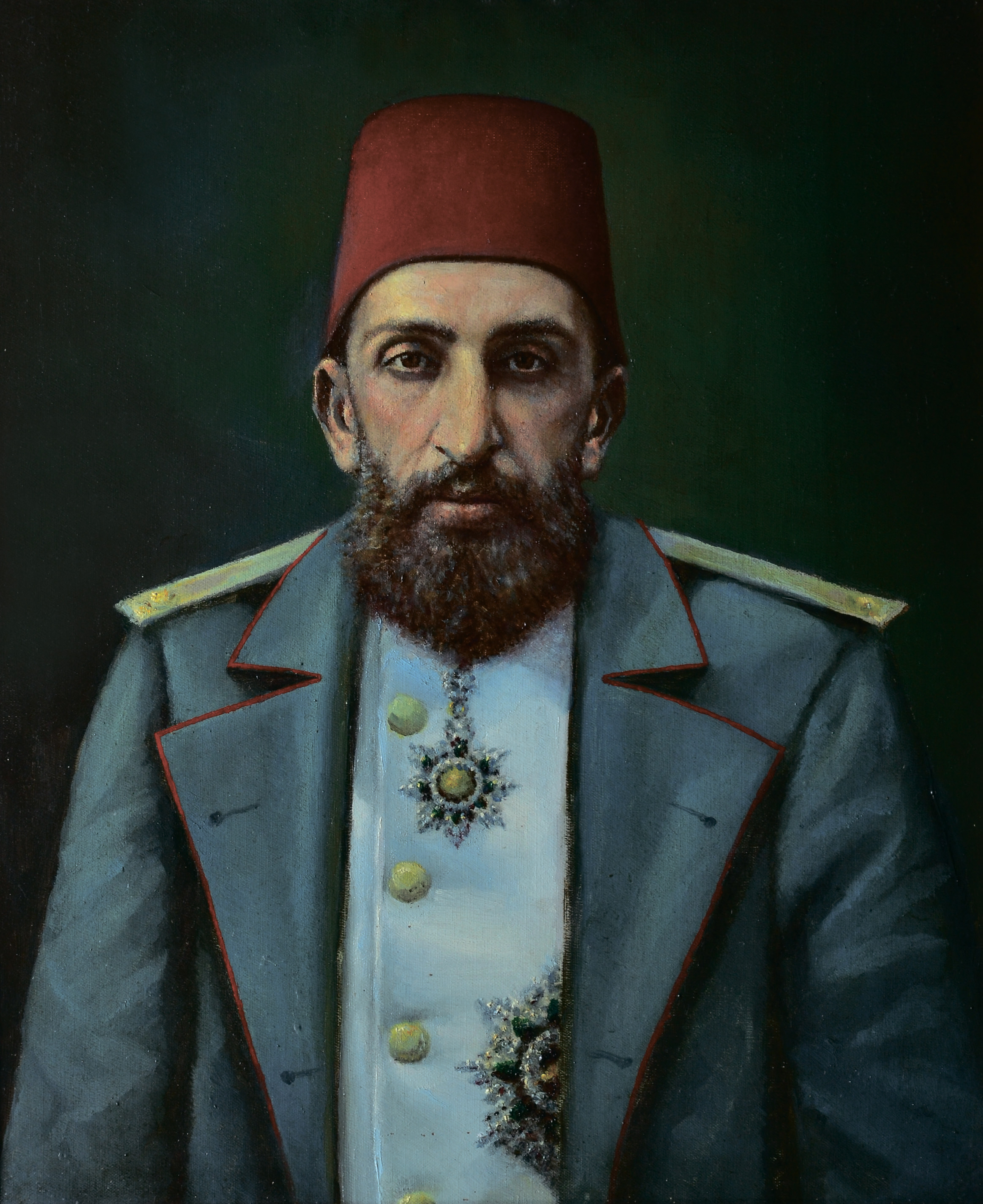
- Portrait 1899

Sultan of the Ottoman Empire (Padishah)
- Reign: 31 August 1876 – 27 April 1909
- Predecessor: Murad V
- Successor: Mehmed V
- Grand viziers: See list: Mehmed Rushdi Pasha Midhat Pasha Ibrahim Edhem Pasha Ahmed Hamdi Pasha Ahmed Vefik Pasha Mehmed Sadık Pasha Saffet Pasha Tunuslu Hayreddin Pasha Ahmed Arifi Pasha Mehmed Said Pasha Kadri Pasha Abdurrahman Nurettin Pasha Kâmil Pasha Ahmed Cevad Pasha Halil Rifat Pasha Mehmed Ferid Pasha Hüseyin Hilmi Pasha Ahmet Tevfik Pasha

Ottoman Caliph (Amir al-Mu'minin)
- Predecessor: Murad V
- Successor: Mehmed V
- Born: 21 September 1842; Constantinople, Ottoman Empire
- Died: 10 February 1918 (aged 75); Beylerbeyi Palace, Constantinople, Ottoman Empire
- Burial: Tomb of Sultan Mahmud II, Fatih, Istanbul, Turkey
- Consorts: List: Nazikeda Kadın; Safinaz Nurefsun Kadın; Bedrifelek Kadın; Bidar Kadın; Dilpesend Kadın; Mezidemestan Kadın; Emsalinur Kadın; Destizer Müşfika Kadın; Sazkar Hanım; Rabia Peyveste Hanım; Fatma Pesend Hanım; Behice Hanım; Saliha Naciye Kadın
- Issue Among others: List: Şehzade Mehmed Selim; Zekiye Sultan; Naime Sultan; Şehzade Mehmed Abdülkadir; Şehzade Ahmed Nuri; Naile Sultan; Şehzade Mehmed Burhaneddin; Şadiye Sultan; Ayşe Sultan; Refia Sultan; Şehzade Abdurrahim Hayri; Şehzade Ahmed Nureddin; Şehzade Mehmed Abid
Names
- Abdul Hamid bin Abdulmejid
- Dynasty: Ottoman
- Father: Abdülmecid I
- Mother: Biological mother: Tirimüjgan Kadın; Adoptive mother: Rahime Perestu Sultan
- Religion: Sunni Islam
- Tughra

Abdülhamid II or Abdul Hamid II (Ottoman Turkish: عبد الحميد ثانی, romanized: Abd ul-Hamid-i s̱ānī; Turkish: II. Abdülhamid; 21 September 1842 – 10 February 1918) was the 34th sultan of the Ottoman Empire, from 1876 to 1909, and the last sultan to exert effective control over the fracturing state. He oversaw a period of decline with rebellions (particularly in the Balkans), and presided over an unsuccessful war with the Russian Empire (1877–78), the loss of Egypt, Cyprus, Bulgaria, Serbia, Montenegro, Tunisia, and Thessaly from Ottoman control (1877–1882), followed by a successful war against Greece in 1897, though Ottoman gains were tempered by subsequent Western European intervention.

Elevated to power in the wake of the 1876 Ottoman coup d'état, he promulgated the Ottoman Empire's first constitution, a sign of the progressive thinking that marked his early rule. But his enthronement came in the context of the Great Eastern Crisis, which began with the Empire's default on its loans, uprisings by Christian Balkan minorities, and a war with the Russian Empire. At the end of the crisis, Ottoman rule in the Balkans and its international prestige were severely diminished, and the Empire lost its economic sovereignty as its finances came under the control of the Great Powers through the Ottoman Public Debt Administration.

In 1878, Abdul Hamid consolidated his rule by suspending both the constitution and the parliament, purging the Young Ottomans, and curtailing the power of the Sublime Porte. He ruled as an autocrat for three decades. Ideologically an Islamist, the sultan asserted his title of Caliph to Muslims around the world. His paranoia about being overthrown, like his uncle and half-brother, led to the creation of a notorious secret police and censorship regime. The Ottoman Empire's modernization and centralization continued during his reign, including reform of the bureaucracy, extension of the Rumelia Railway and the Anatolia Railway, and construction of the Baghdad Railway and the Hejaz Railway with German assistance. Systems for population registration, sedentarization of tribal groups, and control over the press were part of a unique imperialist system in fringe provinces known as borrowed colonialism. The farthest-reaching reforms were in education through the establishment of many professional schools and a network of primary, secondary, and military schools throughout the Empire.

Ironically, the same educational institutions that the Sultan sponsored proved to be his downfall. Large sections of the Ottoman intelligentsia were discontent with his repressive policies, which coalesced into the Young Turks movement. Ethnic minorities started organizing their own national liberation movements, resulting in insurgencies in Macedonia and Eastern Anatolia. Armenians especially suffered from massacres and pogroms at the hands of the Hamidiye regiments. Of the many assassination attempts during Abdul Hamid's reign, one of the most famous is the Armenian Revolutionary Federation's Yıldız assassination attempt of 1905. In 1908, the Committee of Union and Progress forced him to recall parliament and reinstate the constitution in the Young Turk Revolution. Abdul Hamid attempted to reassert his absolutism a year later, resulting in his deposition by pro-constitutionalist forces in the 31 March incident, though the role he played in these events is disputed.

After Abdul Hamid's tyrannical leadership and condoning of atrocities against Armenians between 1894–1897, he was nicknamed the "Red Sultan" or "Bloody Abdul". It was initial consensus that his personal rule created an era of stagnation which held the Ottoman Empire back from the otherwise dynamic Belle Époque. Recent assessments have highlighted his promotion of education and public works projects, his reign a culmination and advancement of the Tanzimat reforms. Since the AKP's rise to power, scholars have attributed a resurgence in his personality cult an attempt to check Mustafa Kemal Atatürk's established image as the founder of modern Turkey.

== Early life and accession ==
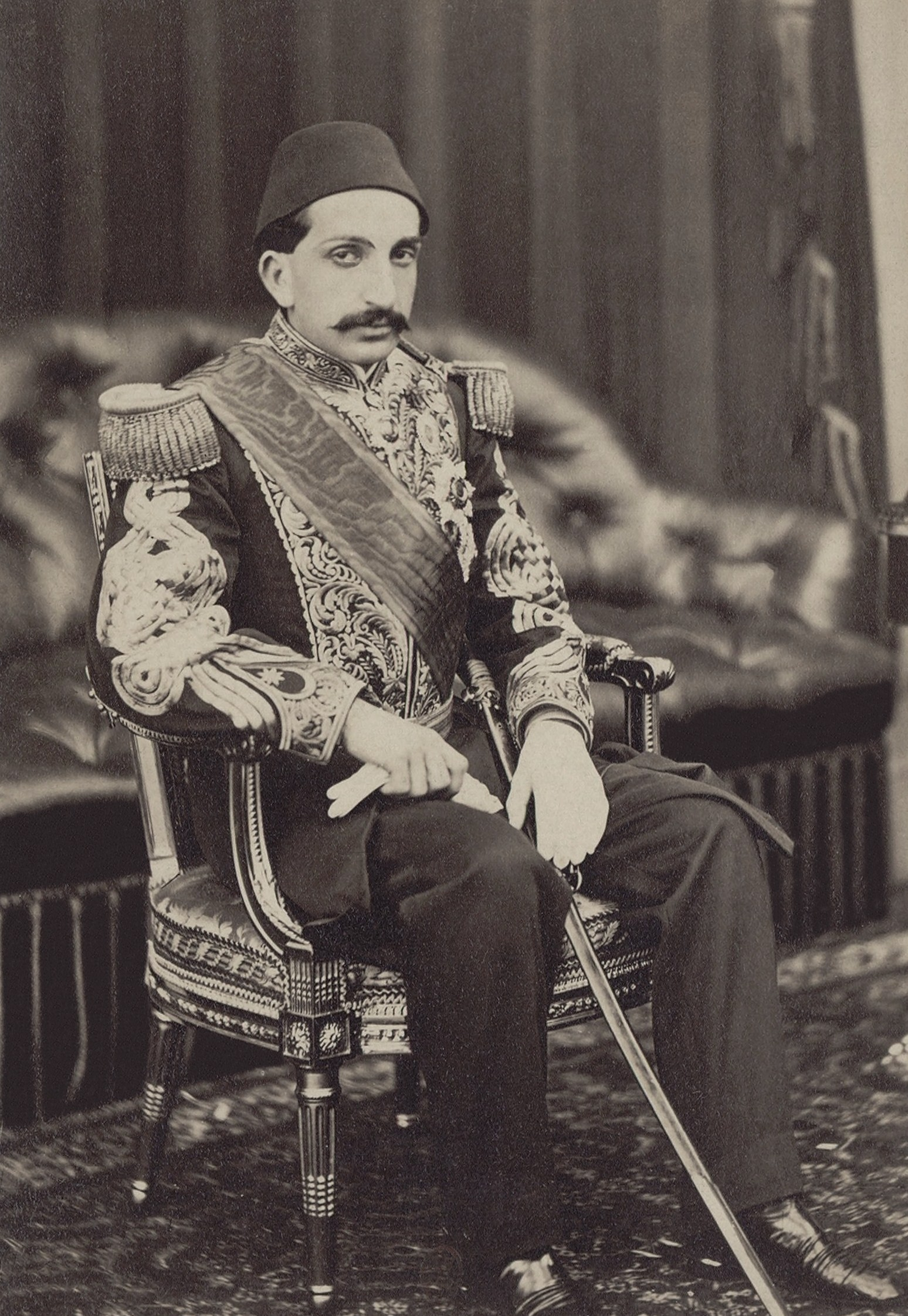
Prince Abdul Hamid at Balmoral Castle in 1867, accompanying his uncle Sultan Abdulaziz during his visit to Western Europe between 21 June 1867 and7 August 1867.

Hamid Efendi was born on 21 September 1842 either in Çırağan Palace, Ortaköy, or at Topkapı Palace, both in Constantinople. He was the son of Sultan Abdulmejid I and Tirimüjgan Kadın (Circassia, 20 August 1819 – Constantinople, Feriye Palace, 2 November 1853), originally named Virjinia. Following his mother's death, he became the adoptive son of his father's legal wife, Perestu Kadın. Perestu was also the adoptive mother of Abdul Hamid's half-sister Cemile Sultan, whose mother Düzdidil Kadın had died in 1845, leaving her motherless at the age of two. The two were brought up in the same household, where they spent their childhood together.

Unlike many other Ottoman sultans, Abdul Hamid II visited distant countries. In the summer of 1867, nine years before he ascended the throne, he accompanied his uncle Sultan Abdul Aziz on a visit to Paris (30 June – 10 July 1867), London (12–23 July 1867), Vienna (28–30 July 1867), and capitals or cities of a number of other European countries.

=== Accession to the Ottoman throne ===
Abdul Hamid ascended the throne after his brother Murad was deposed on 31 August 1876. At his accession, some commentators were impressed that he rode practically unattended to the Eyüp Sultan Mosque, where he was presented with the Sword of Osman. Most people expected Abdul Hamid II to support liberal movements, but he acceded to the throne at a critical time. Economic and political turmoil, local wars in the Balkans, and the Russo-Turkish War threatened the Empire's very existence.

== First Constitutional Era, 1876–1878 ==
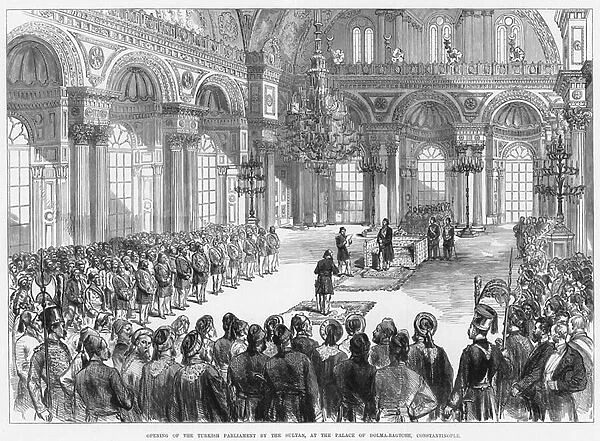
Opening of the first Ottoman Parliament (Meclis-i Umumî), at the Dolmabahçe Palace in 1877

Abdul Hamid worked with the Young Ottomans to realize some form of constitutional arrangement. This new form could help bring about a liberal transition with an Islamic provenance. The Young Ottomans believed that the modern parliamentary system was a restatement of the practice of consultation, or shura, that had existed in early Islam.

In December 1876, due to the 1875 insurrection in Bosnia and Herzegovina, the ongoing war with Serbia and Montenegro, and the feeling aroused throughout Europe by the cruelty used in stamping out the 1876 Bulgarian rebellion, Abdul Hamid promulgated a constitution and a parliament. Midhat Pasha headed the commission to establish a new constitution, and the cabinet passed the constitution on 6 December 1876, allowing for a bicameral legislature with senatorial appointments made by the sultan. The first ever election in the Ottoman Empire was held in 1877. Crucially, the constitution gave Abdul Hamid the right to exile anyone he deemed a threat to the state.

The delegates to the Constantinople Conference were surprised by the promulgation of a constitution, but European powers at the conference rejected the constitution as a too-radical change; they preferred the 1856 constitution (Islâhat Hatt-ı Hümâyûnu) or the 1839 Gülhane edict (Hatt-ı Şerif), and questioned whether a parliament was necessary to act as an official voice of the people.

In any event, like many other would-be reforms of the Ottoman Empire, it proved nearly impossible. Russia continued to mobilize for war, and early in 1877 the Ottoman Empire went to war with the Russian Empire.

=== War with Russia ===
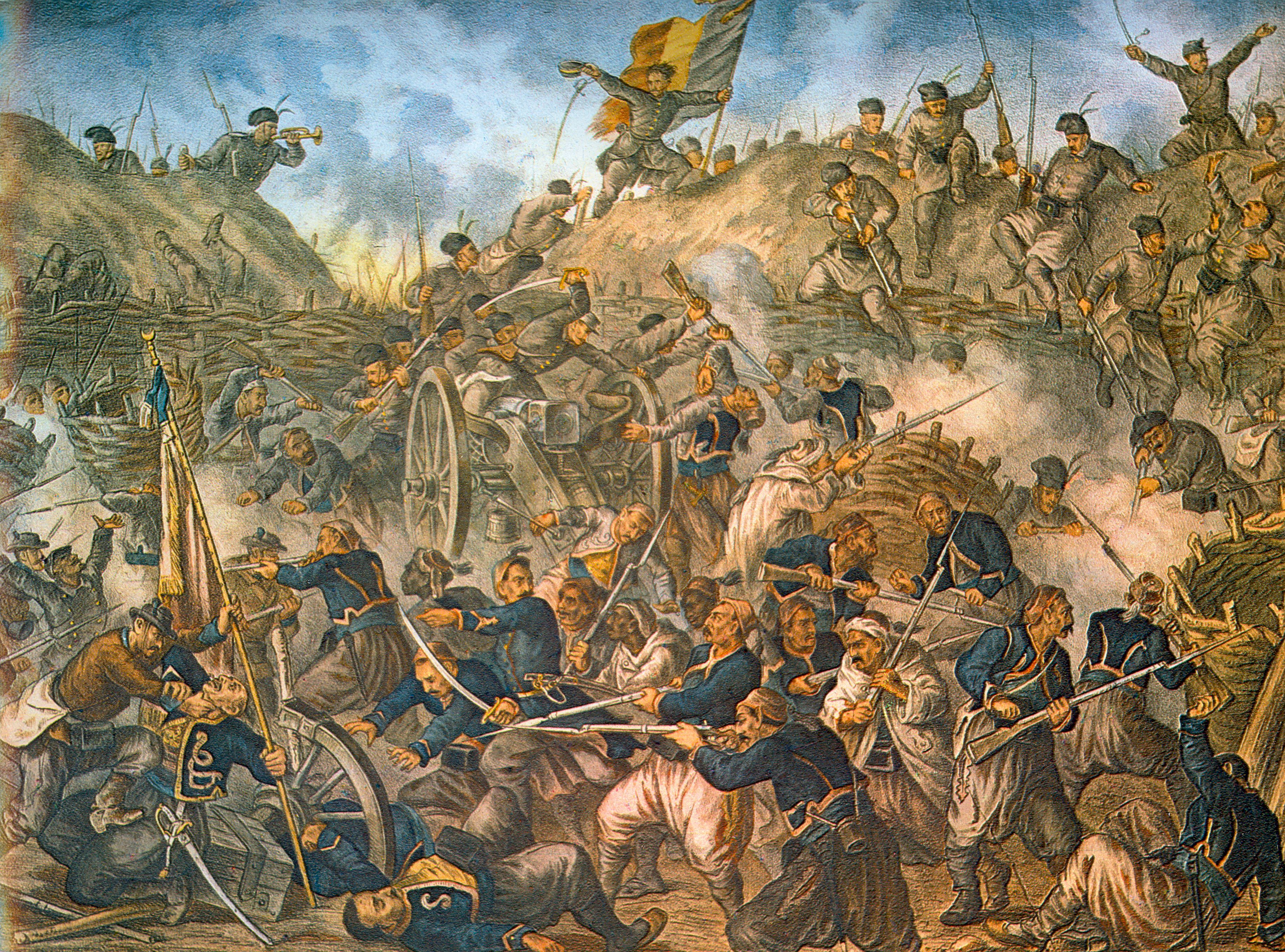
Ottoman troops under Romanian attack at the Siege of Plevna (1877) in the Russo-Turkish War (1877–78)

Abdul Hamid's biggest fear, near dissolution, was realized with the Russian declaration of war on 24 April 1877. In that conflict, the Ottoman Empire fought without help from European allies. Russian chancellor Prince Gorchakov had by that time effectively purchased Austrian neutrality with the Reichstadt Agreement. The British Empire, though still fearing the Russian threat to the British presence in India, did not involve itself in the conflict because of public opinion against the Ottomans, following reports of Ottoman brutality in putting down the Bulgarian uprising. Russia's victory was quick; the conflict ended in February 1878. The Treaty of San Stefano, signed at the end of the war, imposed harsh terms: the Ottoman Empire gave independence to Romania, Serbia, and Montenegro; it granted autonomy to Bulgaria; instituted reforms in Bosnia and Herzegovina; and ceded parts of Dobrudzha to Romania and parts of Armenia to Russia, which was also paid an enormous indemnity. After the war, Abdul Hamid suspended the constitution in February 1878 and dismissed the parliament, after its only meeting, in March 1877. For the next three decades, Abdul Hamid ruled the Ottoman Empire from Yıldız Palace.

== Absolutist rule, 1878–1908 ==
=== Aftermath of war ===
As Russia could dominate the newly independent states, the Treaty of San Stefano greatly increased its influence in Southeastern Europe. At the Great Powers' insistence (especially the United Kingdom's), the treaty was revised at the Congress of Berlin so as to reduce the great advantages Russia gained. In exchange for these favors, Cyprus was ceded to Britain in 1878. There were troubles in Egypt, where a discredited khedive had to be deposed. Abdul Hamid mishandled relations with Urabi Pasha, and as a result, Britain gained de facto control over Egypt and Sudan by sending its troops in 1882 to establish control over the two provinces. Cyprus, Egypt, and Sudan ostensibly remained Ottoman provinces until 1914, when Britain officially annexed them in response to the Ottoman participation in World War I on the side of the Central Powers.

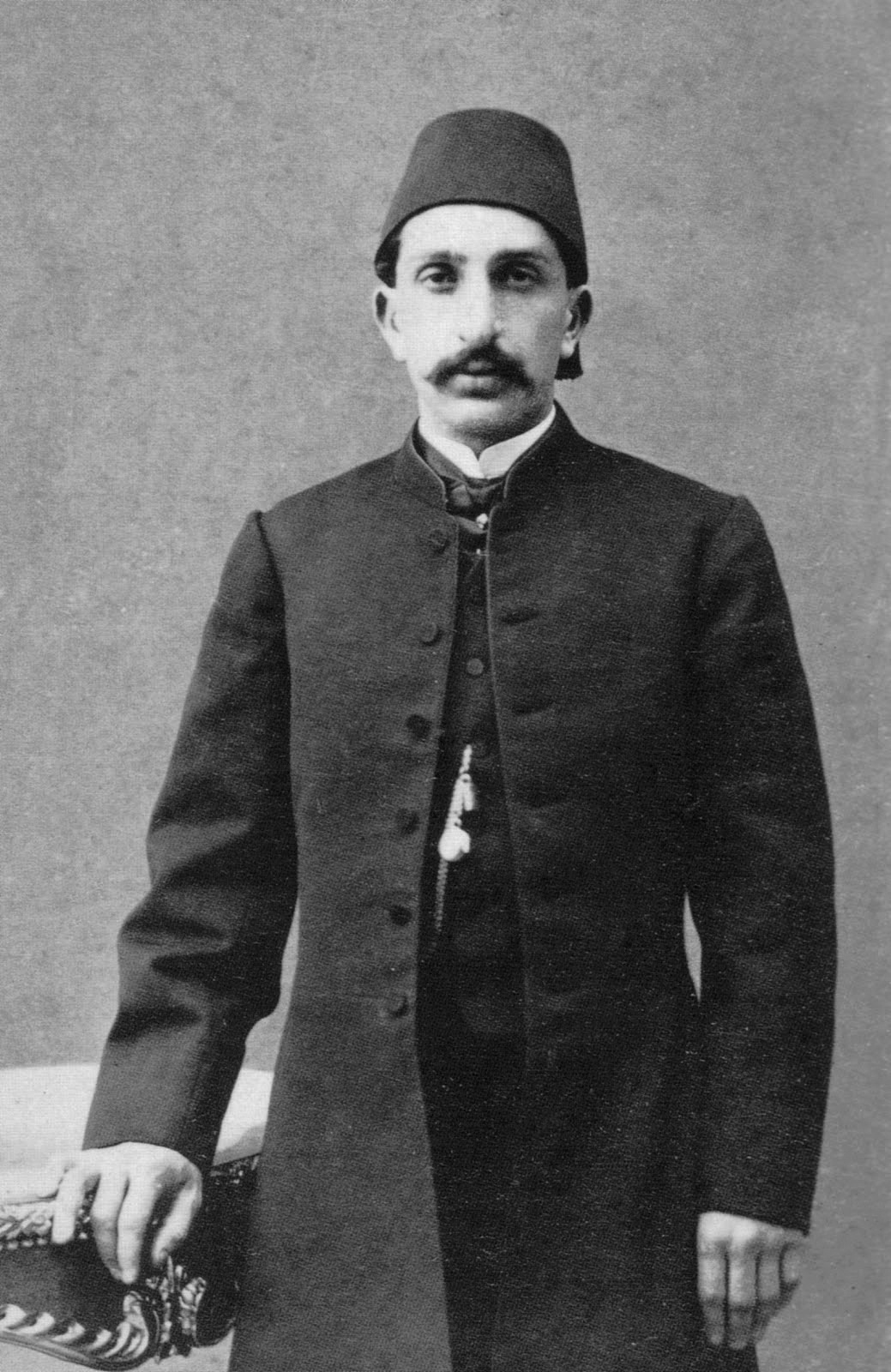
Şehzade (Prince) Abdul Hamid in 1868.

Abdul Hamid's distrust of the reformist admirals of the Ottoman Navy (whom he suspected of plotting against him and trying to restore the constitution) and his subsequent decision to lock the Ottoman fleet (the world's third-largest fleet during the reign of his predecessor Abdul Aziz) inside the Golden Horn indirectly caused the loss of Ottoman overseas territories and islands in North Africa, the Mediterranean Sea, and the Aegean Sea during and after his reign.

Financial difficulties forced him to consent to foreign control over the Ottoman national debt. In a decree issued in December 1881, a large portion of the empire's revenues were handed over to the Public Debt Administration for the benefit of (mostly foreign) bondholders (see Ottoman Decree of 1296).

The 1885 union of Bulgaria with Eastern Rumelia was another blow to the Empire. The creation of an independent and powerful Bulgaria was viewed as a serious threat to the Empire. For many years Abdul Hamid had to deal with Bulgaria in a way that did not antagonize the Russians or the Germans. There were also key problems regarding the Albanian question resulting from the Albanian League of Prizren and with the Greek and Montenegrin frontiers, where the European powers were determined that the Berlin Congress's decisions be carried out.

Crete was granted "extended privileges", but these did not satisfy the population, which sought unification with Greece. In early 1897 a Greek expedition sailed to Crete to overthrow Ottoman rule on the island. This act was followed by the Greco-Turkish War, in which the Ottoman Empire defeated Greece, but as a result of the Treaty of Constantinople, Crete was taken over en depot by the United Kingdom, France, and Russia. Prince George of Greece was appointed ruler and Crete was effectively lost by the Ottoman Empire. The ʿAmmiyya, a revolt in 1889–90 among Druze and other Syrians against excesses of the local sheikhs, similarly led to capitulation to the rebels' demands, as well as concessions to Belgian and French companies to provide a railroad between Beirut and Damascus.

=== Political decisions and reforms ===
Most people expected Abdul Hamid II to have liberal ideas, and some conservatives were inclined to regard him with suspicion as a dangerous reformer. Despite working with the reformist Young Ottomans while still crown prince and appearing to be a liberal leader, he became increasingly conservative after taking the throne. In a process known as İstibdad, Abdul Hamid reduced his ministers to acting as secretaries and concentrated much of the Empire's administration into his own hands. Default in the public funds, an empty treasury, the 1875 insurrection in Bosnia and Herzegovina, the war with Serbia and Montenegro, the result of Russo-Turkish war, and the feeling aroused throughout Europe by Abdul Hamid's government in stamping out the Bulgarian rebellion all contributed to his apprehension regarding enacting significant changes.

His push for education resulted in the establishment of 18 professional schools; and in 1900, Darülfünûn-u Şahâne, now known as Istanbul University, was established. He also created a large system of primary, secondary, and military schools throughout the empire. 51 secondary schools were constructed in a 12-year period (1882–1894). As the goal of the educational reforms in the Hamidian era were to counter foreign influence, these secondary schools used European teaching techniques while instilling in students a strong sense of Ottoman identity and Islamic morality.

Abdul Hamid also reorganized the Ministry of Justice and developed rail and telegraph systems. The telegraph system was expanded to incorporate the furthest parts of the Empire. Railways connected Constantinople and Vienna by 1883, and shortly afterward the Orient Express connected Paris to Constantinople. During his rule, railways within the Ottoman Empire expanded to connect Ottoman-controlled Europe and Anatolia with Constantinople as well. The increased ability to travel and communicate within the Ottoman Empire served to strengthen Constantinople's influence over the rest of the Empire.

Abdul Hamid introduced legislation against the slave trade via the Anglo-Ottoman Convention of 1880 and the Kanunname of 1889.

Abdul Hamid took stringent measures regarding his security. The memory of the deposition of Abdul Aziz was on his mind and convinced him that a constitutional government was not a good idea. Because of this, information was tightly controlled and the press rigidly censored. A secret police (Umur-u Hafiye) and a network of informants was present throughout the empire, and many leading figures of the Second Constitutional Era and Ottoman successor states were arrested or exiled. School curricula were closely inspected to prevent dissidence. Ironically, the schools that Abdul Hamid founded and tried to control became "breeding grounds of discontent" as students and teachers alike chafed at the censors' clumsy restrictions.

=== Armenian question ===
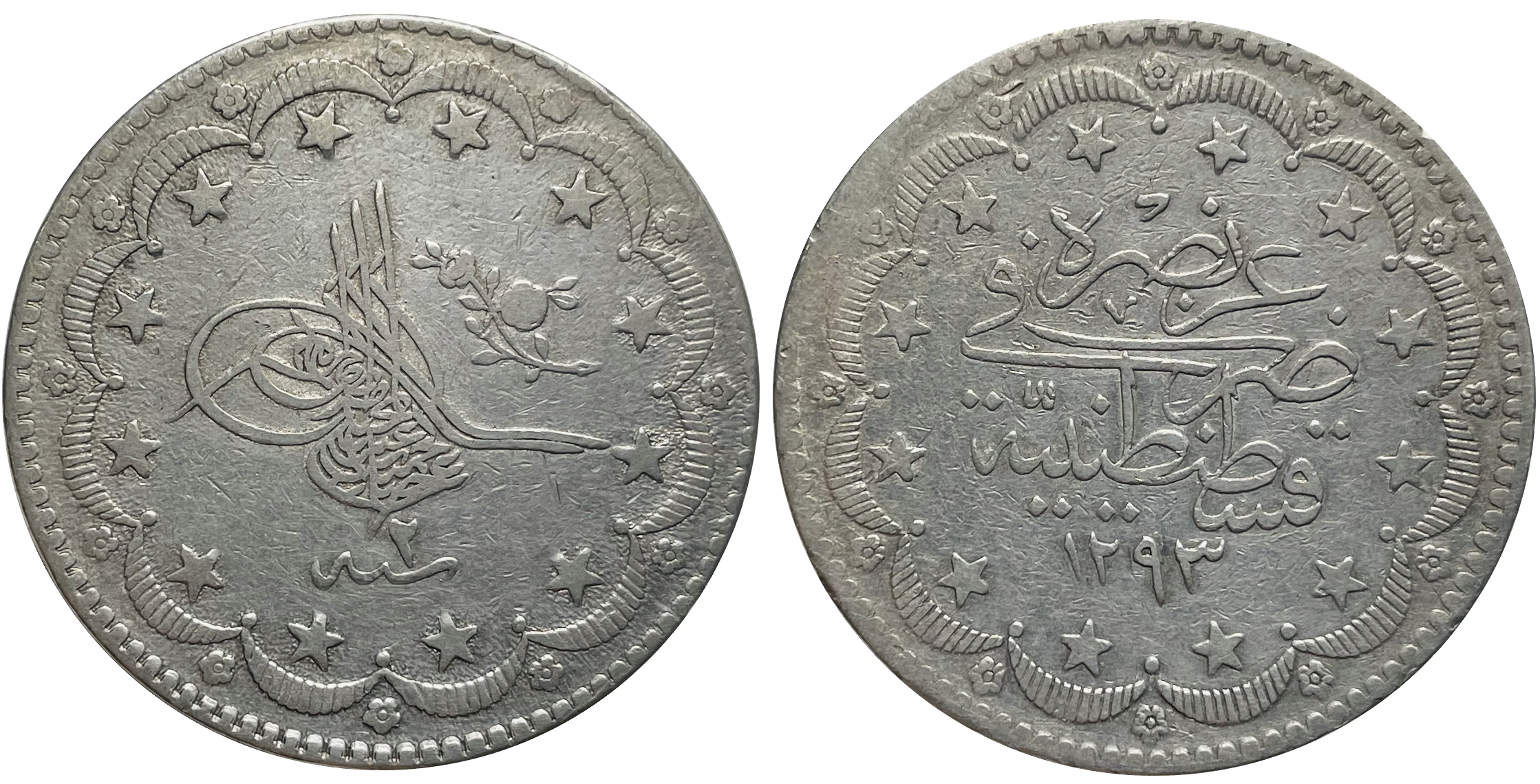
20 kuruş during the reign of Abdul Hamid II, dating 1877

Starting around 1890, Armenians began demanding implementation of the reforms promised to them at the Berlin Conference. To prevent such measures, in 1890–91 Abdul Hamid gave semi-official status to the bandits who were already actively mistreating the Armenians in the provinces. Made up of Kurds and other ethnic groups such as Turcomans, and armed by the state, they came to be called the Hamidiye Alayları ("Hamidian Regiments"). The Hamidiye and Kurdish brigands were given free rein to attack Armenians – confiscating stores of grain, foodstuffs, and driving off livestock – confident of escaping punishment as they were subject only to court-martial. In the face of such violence, the Armenians established revolutionary organizations: the Social Democrat Hunchakian Party (Hunchak; founded in Switzerland in 1887) and the Armenian Revolutionary Federation (the ARF or Dashnaktsutiun, founded in 1890 in Tiflis). Unrest ensued and clashes occurred in 1892 at Merzifon and in 1893 at Tokat. Abdul Hamid put these revolts down with harsh methods. As a result, 300,000 Armenians were killed in what became known as the Hamidian massacres. News of the massacres was widely reported in Europe and the United States and drew strong responses from foreign governments and humanitarian organizations.

Abdul Hamid's personal role in the massacres is disputed. It is considered unlikely that he personally ordered them, but there is circumstantial evidence that suggest he showed "benign neglect", if not "actual covert support" for the perpetrators. Robert Melson noted that a distinction must be made between the policies of Abdul Hamid and of the later policies of the Young Turks during the Armenian genocide: "Sultan Abdul Hamid II had no intention of exterminating the Armenians or destroying the Armenian millet as such. The main reason why total genocide was not perpetrated by the Ottoman regime in 1894–1896 was its commitment to Islam, to the millet system, and to restoring the old order".

After the massacres, Abdul Hamid began to be called the "Bloody Sultan" or "Red Sultan" in the West. On 21 July 1905, the Armenian Revolutionary Federation attempted to assassinate him with a car bomb during a public appearance, but he was delayed for a minute, and the bomb went off too early, killing 26, wounding 58 (four of whom died during their treatment in hospital), and destroying 17 cars. This continued aggression, along with the handling of the Armenian desire for reform, led western European powers to take a more hands-on approach with the Turks. Abdul Hamid survived an attempted stabbing in 1904 as well.

=== Foreign policy ===
==== Pan-Islamism ====
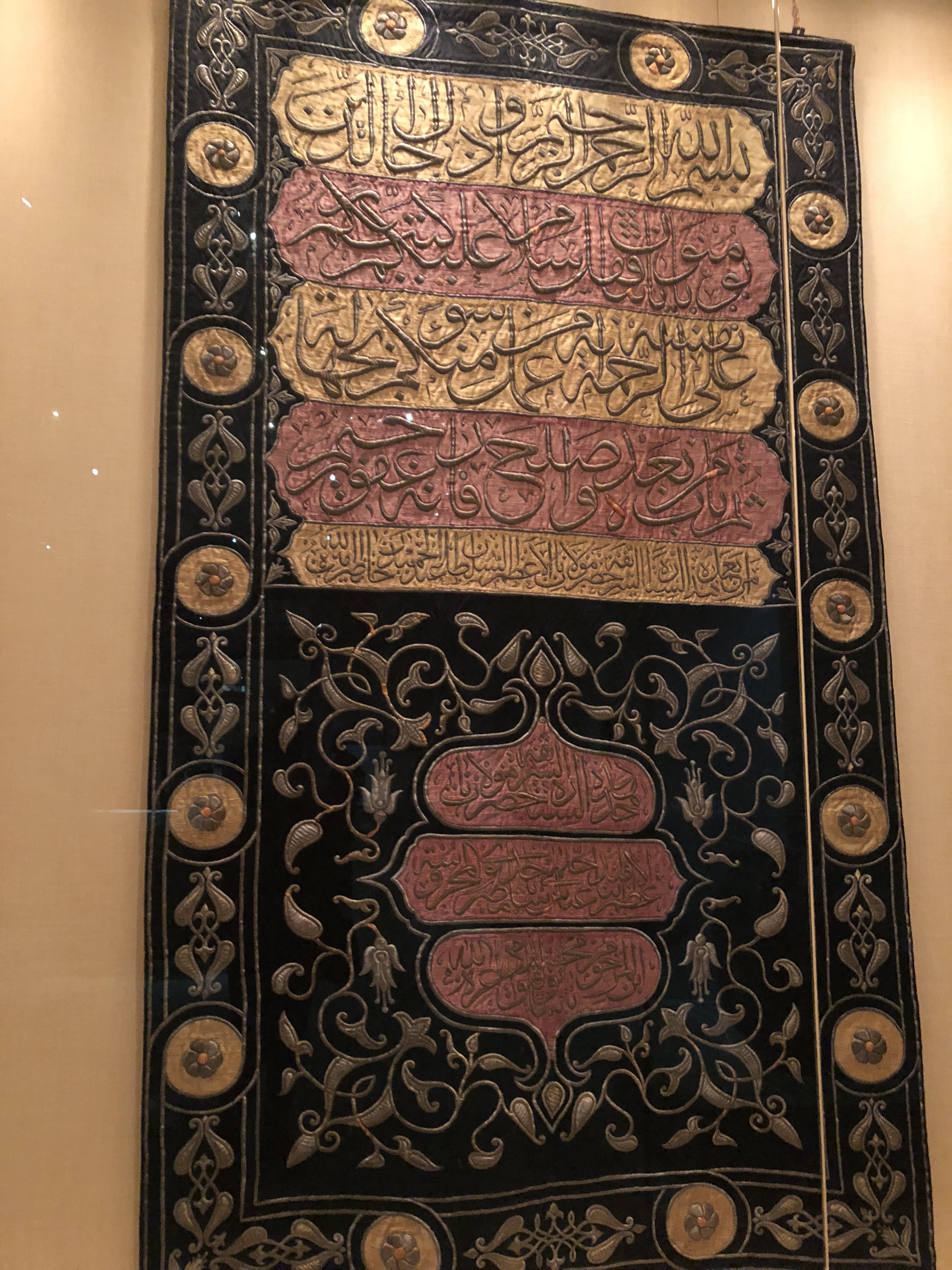
An example of what once hung on the Door of Repentance of the Ka'ba in 1897 until 1898. It was made in Egypt under Abdul Hamid II's ruling of the Ottoman Empire. His name is stitched into the fifth line following a verse from the Qur'an.

Abdul Hamid did not believe that the Tanzimat movement could succeed in helping the disparate peoples of the empire achieve a common identity, such as Ottomanism. He adopted a new ideological principle, Pan-Islamism; since, beginning in 1517, Ottoman sultans were also nominally Caliphs, he wanted to promote that fact and emphasized the Ottoman Caliphate. Given the great diversity of ethnicities in the Ottoman Empire, he believed that Islam was the only way to unite his people.

Pan-Islamism encouraged Muslims living under European powers to unite under one polity. This threatened several European countries: Austria through Bosnian Muslims; Russia through Tatars and Kurds; France and Spain through Moroccan Muslims; and Britain through Indian Muslims. Foreigners' privileges in the Ottoman Empire, which were an obstacle to effective government, were curtailed. At the very end of his reign, Abdul Hamid finally provided funds to start construction of the strategically important Constantinople-Baghdad Railway and the Constantinople-Medina Railway, which would ease the trip to Mecca for the Hajj; after he was deposed, the CUP accelerated and completed construction of both railways. Missionaries were sent to distant countries preaching Islam and the Caliph's supremacy. During his rule, Abdul Hamid refused Theodor Herzl's offers to pay down a substantial portion of the Ottoman debt (150 million pounds sterling in gold) in exchange for a charter allowing the Zionists to settle in Palestine. He is famously quoted as telling Herzl's Emissary, "as long as I am alive, I will not have our body divided; only our corpse they can divide." In June 1896, through Zionist diplomatic agent Philip de Newlinski in Istanbul, Herzl met with the Sultan, who declined the offer, saying the land belonged to his people, who had defended it with their lives, and that he would not sell even a foot of it. (Note: "If Mr. Herzl is as much of a friend to you as you are to me [he said], then advise him not to take one further step in this matter. I cannot sell a single foot of this land; it does not belong to me but to my people. My people have won this empire with their blood.... We will again drench it with our blood before we let it be wrested from us.... The Turkish Empire belongs not to me, but to the Turkish people. Let the Jews save their billions. When my empire is carved up, they might even get Palestine for nothing. But only our corpse will be divided. I will not consent to a vivisection.") In May 1901, Herzl requested another meeting with the Sultan, facilitated by the Sultan's mediator Ármin Vámbéry, and learned that the Sultan wanted to reclaim control of the Ottoman Public Debt Administration, which was administered by European powers. As a result, Herzl aimed to free the Sultan from European financiers by consolidating Ottoman debt through a Jewish syndicate. Since the Ottomans were interested in separating financial matters from the colonization proposal, the negotiations were unsuccessful. Abdul Hamid accepted the arrival of Jews to Ottoman lands on condition that they did not gather in one place, and offered Herzl the option of settling Jews in Mesopotamia in scattered communities, but Herzl did not accept this offer.

Pan-Islamism was a considerable success. After the Greco-Ottoman war, many Muslims celebrated the Ottoman victory as their victory. Uprisings, lockouts, and objections to European colonization in newspapers were reported in Muslim regions after the war. But Abdul Hamid's appeals to Muslim sentiment were not always very effective, due to widespread disaffection within the Empire. In Mesopotamia and Yemen, disturbance was endemic; nearer home, a semblance of loyalty was maintained in the army and among the Muslim population only by a system of deflation and espionage.

==== America and the Philippines ====
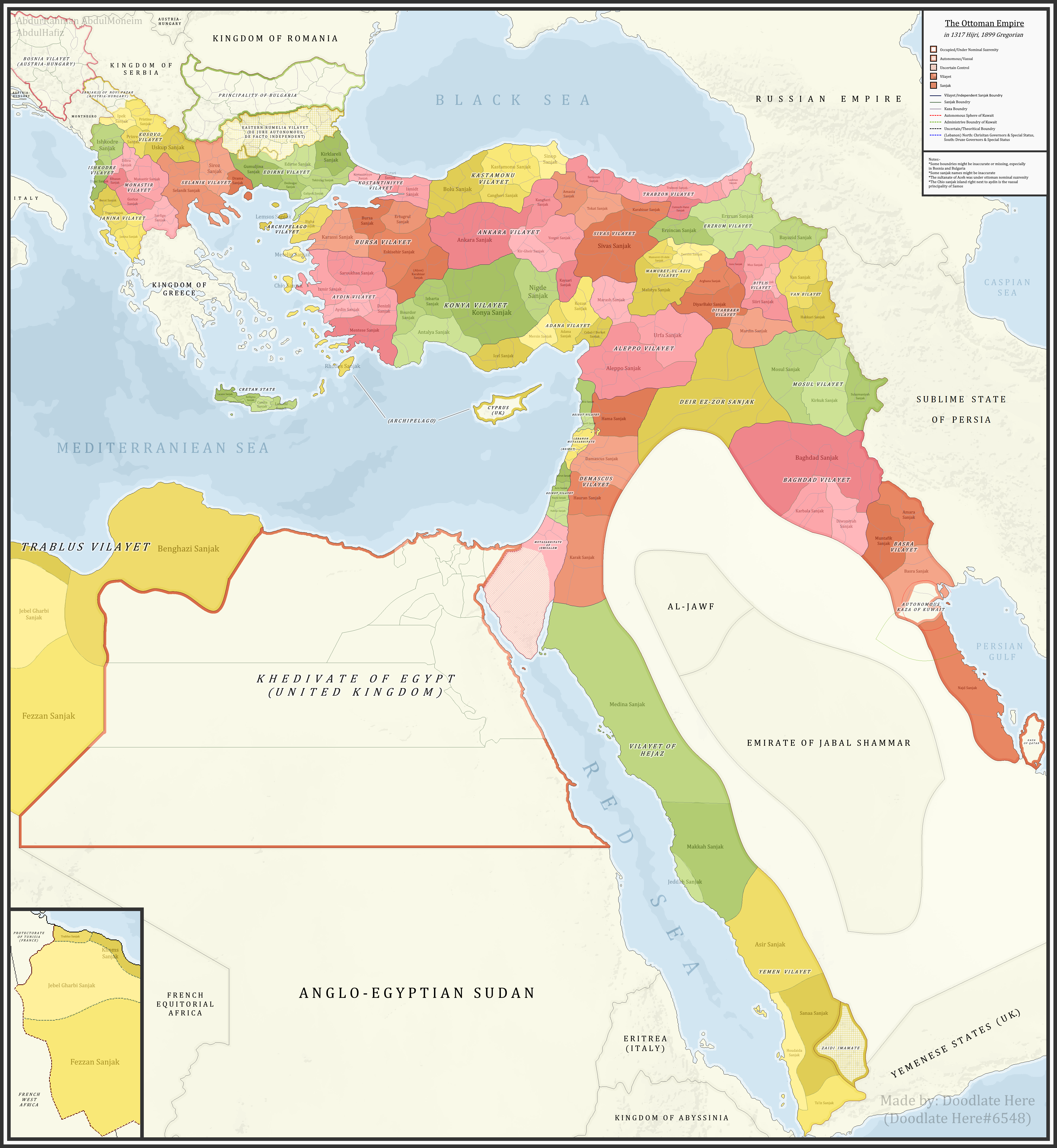
Map of the Ottoman Empire during the reign of Abdul Hamid II

In 1898, U.S. Secretary of State John Hay asked United States Minister to the Ottoman Empire Oscar Straus to request that Abdul Hamid, in his capacity as caliph, write a letter to the Sulu Muslims, a Moro subgroup, of the Sulu Sultanate in the Philippines, ordering them not to join the Moro Rebellion and submit to American suzerainty and American military rule. The Sultan obliged the Americans and wrote the letter, which was sent to Mecca, whence two Sulu chiefs brought it to Sulu. It was successful, since the "Sulu Mohammedans ... refused to join the insurrectionists and had placed themselves under the control of our army, thereby recognizing American sovereignty."

Despite Abdul Hamid's "pan-Islamic" ideology, he had readily acceded to Straus's request for help in telling the Sulu Muslims to not resist America, since he felt no need to cause hostilities between the West and Muslims. Collaboration between the American military and Sulu Sultanate was due to the Ottoman Sultan persuading the Sulu Sultan. John P. Finley wrote:

After due consideration of these facts, the Sultan, as Caliph caused a message to be sent to the Mohammedans of the Philippine Islands forbidding them to enter into any hostilities against the Americans, inasmuch as no interference with their religion would be allowed under American rule. As the Moros have never asked more than that, it is not surprising, that they refused all overtures made, by Aguinaldo's agents, at the time of the Filipino insurrection. President McKinley sent a personal letter of thanks to Mr. Straus for the excellent work he had done, and said, its accomplishment had saved the United States at least twenty thousand troops in the field.

President McKinley did not mention the Ottoman role in the pacification of the Sulu Moros in his address to the first session of the Fifty-sixth Congress in December 1899, since the agreement with the Sultan of Sulu was not submitted to the Senate until 18 December. The Bates Treaty, which the Americans signed with the Moro Sulu Sultanate, and which guaranteed the Sultanate's autonomy in its internal affairs and governance, was then violated by the Americans, who then invaded Moroland, causing the Moro Rebellion to break out in 1904, with war raging between the Americans and Moro Muslims and atrocities committed against Moro Muslim women and children, such as the Moro Crater Massacre.

==== Germany's support ====
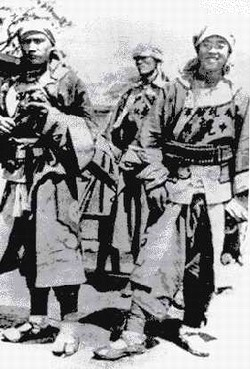
Abdul Hamid II attempted to correspond with the Chinese Muslim troops in service of the Qing imperial army serving under General Dong Fuxiang; they were also known as the Kansu Braves.

The Triple Entente – the United Kingdom, France and Russia – had strained relations with the Ottoman Empire. Abdul Hamid and his close advisors believed the Empire should be treated as an equal player by these great powers. In the Sultan's view, the Ottoman Empire was a European empire that was distinguished by having more Muslims than Christians.

Over time, the hostile diplomatic attitudes of France (the occupation of Tunisia in 1881) and Great Britain (the 1882 establishment of de facto control in Egypt) caused Abdul Hamid to gravitate towards Germany. Abdul Hamid twice hosted Kaiser Wilhelm II in Istanbul, on 21 October 1889 and on 5 October 1898. (Wilhelm II later visited Constantinople a third time, on 15 October 1917, as a guest of Mehmed V.) German officers such as Baron von der Goltz and Bodo-Borries von Ditfurth were employed to oversee the organization of the Ottoman Army.

German government officials were brought in to reorganize the Ottoman government's finances. The German emperor was also rumored to have counseled Abdul Hamid in his controversial decision to appoint his third son as his successor. Germany's friendship was not altruistic; it had to be fostered by railway and loan concessions. In 1899, a significant German wish, the construction of a Berlin-Baghdad railway, was granted.

Kaiser Wilhelm II also requested the Sultan's help when he had trouble with Chinese Muslim troops. During the Boxer Rebellion, the Chinese Muslim Kansu Braves fought the German Army, routing them and the other Eight Nation Alliance forces. The Muslim Kansu Braves and Boxers defeated the Alliance forces led by the German Captain Guido von Usedom at the Battle of Langfang during the Seymour Expedition, in 1900, and besieged the trapped Alliance forces during the Siege of the International Legations. It was only on the second attempt, in the Gasalee Expedition, that the Alliance forces managed to get through to battle the Chinese Muslim troops at the Battle of Peking. Wilhelm was so alarmed by the Chinese Muslim troops that he requested that Abdul Hamid find a way to stop the Muslim troops from fighting. Abdul Hamid agreed to Wilhelm's demands and sent Hasan Enver Pasha (no relation to the Young Turk leader) to China in 1901, but the rebellion was over by that time. Because the Ottomans did not want conflict with the European nations and because the Ottoman Empire was ingratiating itself to gain German assistance, an order imploring Chinese Muslims to avoid assisting the Boxers was issued by the Ottoman Khalifa and reprinted in Egyptian and Muslim Indian newspapers.

=== Opposition ===
Abdul Hamid II made many enemies in the Ottoman Empire. His reign featured several coup d'état plans and many rebellions. The Sultan triumphed in a challenge by Kâmil Pasha of absolute rule in 1895. A large conspiracy by the Committee of Union and Progress was also foiled during the 1896 Ottoman coup d'état attempt. His ascendancy finally ended in a revolution in 1908, and his reign for good ended with the 31 March Incident. These conspiracies were primarily driven by members of the Ottoman government due to dissatisfaction with autocracy. Journalists had to contend with a strict censorship regime, while the intelligentsia chafed under the surveillance of intelligence agencies. It was in this context that a broad opposition movement to the sultan emerged, known as the Young Turks to European observers. Most Young Turks were ambitious military officers, constitutionalists, and bureaucrats of the Sublime Porte.

With state policy fostering an Islamist Ottomanism, Christian minority groups also began to turn against the government, going so far as to advocate for separatism. By the 1890s, Greek, Bulgarian, Serbian, and Aromanian militant groups started fighting Ottoman authorities, and each other, in the Macedonian conflict. Using the İdare-i Örfiyye, a clause in the defunct Ottoman constitution comparable to declaring a state of siege, the government suspended civil rights in the Ottoman Balkans. İdare-i Örfiyye was also soon declared in Eastern Anatolia to more effectively prosecute fedayi. The statute persisted under the Ottoman Empire and the Republic of Turkey until the 1940s.

Educated Muslim women resented the Salafist Hatts that mandated veils be worn outside the home and to be accompanied by men, though these decrees were mostly ignored.

== Second constitutional era and downfall, 1908-09 ==
=== Young Turk Revolution ===
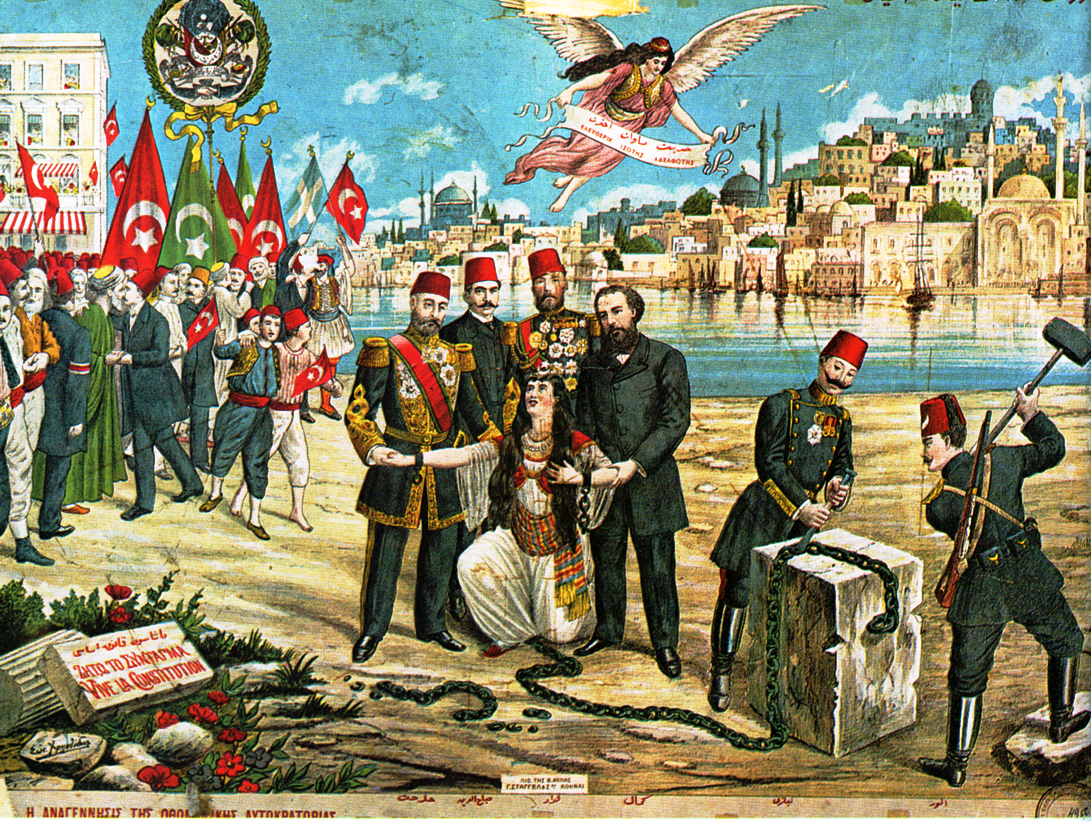
Greek lithograph celebrating the Young Turk Revolution in 1908 and the restoration of the 1876 constitution in the Ottoman Empire

The national humiliation of the Macedonian conflict, together with the resentment in the army against the palace spies and informers, at last brought matters to a crisis. The Committee of Union and Progress (CUP), a Young Turks organization that was especially influential in the Rumelian army units, undertook the Young Turk Revolution in the summer of 1908. Upon learning that the troops in Salonica were marching on Istanbul (23 July), Abdul Hamid capitulated. On 24 July an irade announced the restoration of the suspended constitution of 1876; the next day, further irades abolished espionage and censorship, and ordered the release of political prisoners.

On 17 December, Abdul Hamid reopened the General Assembly with a speech from the throne in which he said that the first parliament had been "temporarily dissolved until the education of the people had been brought to a sufficiently high level by the extension of instruction throughout the empire."

=== Deposition ===
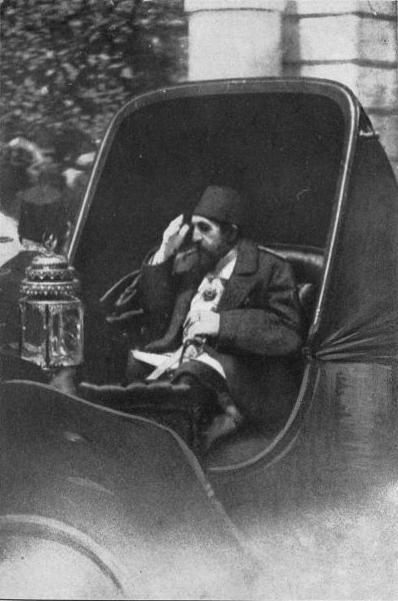
Abdul Hamid II's last ride through the streets of Istanbul after the 31 March Incident

Abdul Hamid's new attitude did not save him from the suspicion of intriguing with the state's powerful reactionary elements, a suspicion confirmed by his attitude toward the counter-revolution of 13 April 1909, known as the 31 March Incident, when an insurrection of the soldiers backed by a conservative upheaval in some parts of the military in the capital overthrew Hüseyin Hilmi Pasha's government. With the Young Turks driven out of the capital, Abdul Hamid appointed Ahmet Tevfik Pasha in his place, and once again suspended the constitution and shuttered the parliament. But the Sultan controlled only Constantinople, while the Unionists were still influential in the rest of the army and provinces. The CUP appealed to Mahmud Şevket Pasha to restore the status quo. Şevket Pasha organized an ad hoc formation known as the Action Army, which marched on Constantinople. Şevket Pasha's chief of staff was captain Mustafa Kemal. The Action Army stopped first in Aya Stefanos, and negotiated with the rival government established by deputies who escaped from the capital, which was led by Mehmed Talat. It was secretly decided there that Abdul Hamid must be deposed. When the Action Army entered Istanbul, a fatwa was issued condemning Abdul Hamid, and the parliament voted to dethrone him. On 27 April, Abdul Hamid's half-brother Reshad Efendi was proclaimed as Sultan Mehmed V.

The Sultan's countercoup, which had appealed to conservative Islamists against the Young Turks' liberal reforms, resulted in the massacre of tens of thousands of Christian Armenians in the Adana province, known as the Adana massacre.

== After deposition ==
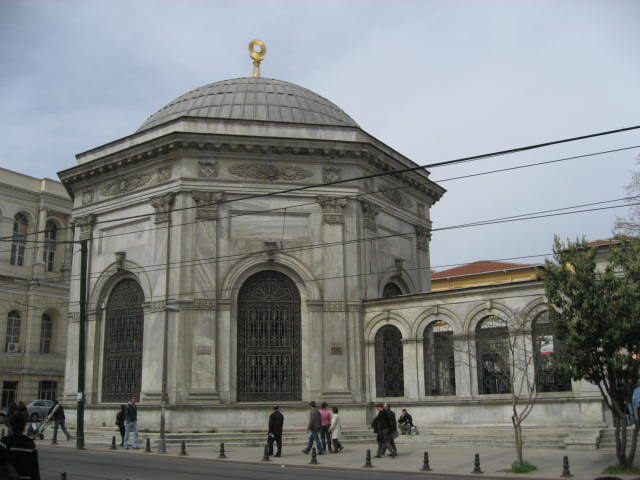
The mausoleum (türbe) of Sultans Mahmud II, Abdulaziz, and Abdul Hamid II, located at Divanyolu street, Istanbul

Abdul Hamid was conveyed into captivity at Salonica (now Thessaloniki), mostly at the Villa Allatini in the city's southern outskirts. In 1912, when Salonica fell to Greece, he was returned to captivity in Constantinople. He spent his last days studying, practicing carpentry, and writing his memoirs in custody at Beylerbeyi Palace in the Bosphorus, in the company of his wives and children. He died there in 1918.

In 1930, his nine widows and thirteen children were granted $50 million from his estate after a lawsuit that lasted five years. His estate was worth $1.5 billion.

Abdul Hamid was the last sultan of the Ottoman Empire to hold absolute power. He presided over 33 years of decline, during which other European countries regarded the empire as the "sick man of Europe".

== Personal life ==
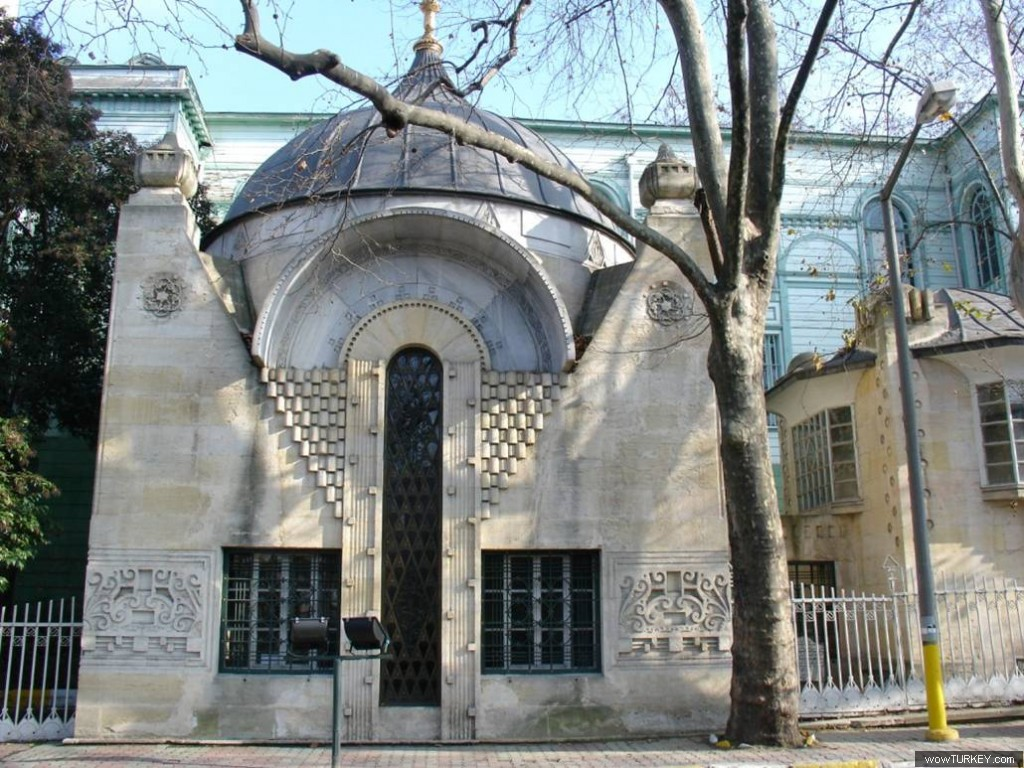
The tomb of the Libyan Sufi Sheikh Muhammad Zafir al-Madani in Istanbul who initiated the Sultan into the Shadhili Sufi Order

Abdul Hamid II was a skilled carpenter and personally crafted some high-quality furniture, which can be seen at the Yıldız Palace, Şale Köşkü, and Beylerbeyi Palace in Istanbul. He was also interested in opera and personally wrote the first-ever Turkish translations of many classic operas. He also composed several operatic pieces for the Mızıka-yı Hümâyun (Ottoman Imperial Band/Orchestra, established by his grandfather Mahmud II who had appointed Donizetti Pasha as its Instructor General in 1828), and hosted the famous performers of Europe at the Opera House of Yıldız Palace, which was restored in the 1990s and featured in the 1999 film Harem Suare (it begins with a scene of Abdul Hamid watching a performance). One of his guests was the French stage actress Sarah Bernhardt, who performed for audiences.

Abdul Hamid was also a good wrestler at Yağlı güreş and a "patron saint" of the wrestlers. He organized wrestling tournaments in the empire, and selected wrestlers were invited to the palace. Abdul Hamid personally tested the sportsmen, and skilled ones remained in the palace. He was also skilled at drawing, having drawn the sole known portrait of his fourth wife, Bidar Kadın. He was extremely fond of Sherlock Holmes novels, and awarded their author, Arthur Conan Doyle, the Order of the Medjidie, 2nd-Class, in 1907.

Bilgi University professor Suraiya Farooqi stated that the sultan's "tastes were distinctly Verdi" despite his political rule being "conservative".

=== Paranoia ===
Depiction of American politician and House speaker Joseph Gurney Cannon as Abdul Hamid II

It was rumored that Abdul Hamid always carried a pistol on his person at all times. In addition to locking the Ottoman Navy in the Golden Horn, he also did not allow the army to train with live ammunition.

=== Religion ===
Abdul Hamid practiced traditional Islamic Sufism. He was influenced by the Libyan Shadhili Madani Sheikh, Muhammad Zafir al-Madani, whose lessons he attended in disguise in Unkapani before he became sultan. After he ascended the throne, Abdul Hamid asked al-Madani to return to Istanbul. Al-Madani initiated Shadhili gatherings of remembrance (dhikr) in the newly commissioned Yıldız Hamidiye Mosque; on Thursday evenings he accompanied Sufi masters in reciting dhikr. He also became a close religious and political confidant of the sultan. In 1879, the sultan forgave the taxes of all of the Caliphate's Madani Sufi lodges (also known as zawiyas and tekkes). In 1888, he even established a Sufi lodge for the Madani order of Shadhili Sufism in Istanbul, which he commissioned as part of the Ertuğrul Tekke mosque. The relationship of the sultan and the sheik lasted for 30 years, until the latter's death in 1903.

=== Poetry ===
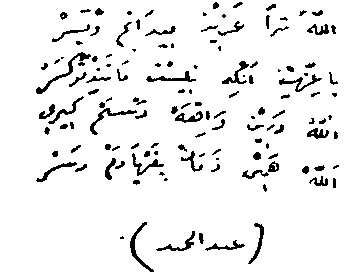
A sample of his handwritten poetry in Persian language and scripts, which was taken from the book My Father Abdul Hameed, written by his daughter Ayşe Sultan

Abdul Hamid wrote poetry, following in the footsteps of many other Ottoman sultans. One of his poems translates thus:

My Lord I know you are the Dear One (Al-Aziz)
... And no one but you are the Dear One
You are the One, and nothing else
My God take my hand in these hard times
My God be my helper in this critical hour

=== Impressions ===
In the opinion of F. A. K. Yasamee:

He was a striking amalgam of determination and timidity, of insight and fantasy, held together by immense practical caution and an instinct for the fundamentals of power. He was frequently underestimated. Judged on his record, he was a formidable domestic politician and an effective diplomat.

== Family ==
Abdul Hamid had numerous consorts, but allowed none of them to have political influence; in the same way he did not allow his adoptive mother, Rahime Perestu Sultan, or other female members of his family to have such influence, though some of them still had some degree of power in private or in the daily life of the harem. The only, partial exception was Cemile Sultan, his half-sister and adoptive sister. He was convinced that his predecessors' reigns, especially those of his uncle Abdülaziz and his father Abdülmecid I, had been ruined by the excessive meddling of the women of the imperial family in affairs of state.

=== Consorts ===
Abdul Hamid had at least 23 consorts:

- Nazikeda Kadın (1848 – 11 April 1895). BaşKadin (First Consort). She was an Abkhazian princess, born Mediha Hanim, lady-in-waiting to Cemile Sultan. She died prematurely after years of deep depression, due to the death of her only daughter.
- Safinaz Nurefsun Kadın (1850–1915). Her real name was Ayşe and she was the younger sister of the last consort of Abdülmecid I, Yıldız Hanım. When Yıldız Hanım married Abdülmecid, Ayşe was sent into the service of Şehzade Abdülaziz, where she was renamed Safinaz. According to Harun Açba, Abdülaziz was fascinated by her beauty and wanted to marry her, but she refused because she was in love with Şehzade Abdul Hamid. The feeling was mutual and the young prince asked for the help of his stepmother Rahime Perestu Kadin. She told Abdülaziz that Safinaz was ill and that she needed a change of air; later, Abdülaziz was informed of her death. Abdul Hamid then secretly married Safinaz, who was renamed Nurefsun, in October 1868. However, she could not get used to life in the harem and wanted to be Abdul Hamid's only consort. She then asked for a divorce, which was granted to her in 1879. She had no children.
- Bedrifelek Kadın (1851–1930). Circassian Princess who took refuge in Istanbul when Russia invaded the Caucasus. She ruled Abdul Hamid's harem when Rahime Perestu Sultan died. She left Abdul Hamid when he was deposed, perhaps disappointed that their son had not been chosen as successor. She had two sons and a daughter.
- Bidar Kadın (5 May 1858 – 13 January 1918). Kabartian princess, she was considered the most beautiful and charming of Abdul Hamid's consorts. She had a son and a daughter.
- Ziyater Hanim (1860 - 1894). Circassian, she asked to leave Yildiz Palace and Istanbul and live in Madina between early to mid 1880s.
- Dilpesend Kadın (16 January 1865 – 17 June 1901). Georgian. She was educated by Tiryal Hanim, the last consort of Mahmud II, who was Abdul Hamid's grandfather. She had two daughters.
- Mezidemestan Kadın (3 March 1869 – 21 January 1909). She was born Kadriye Kamile Merve Hanim, she was the aunt of Emine Nazikeda Kadın, future consort of Mehmed VI. She was loved by everyone, including his other consorts and her stepchildren. She was the most influential of his consorts, but she never abused her power. She had a son, who was Abdul Hamid's favorite.
- Emsalinur Kadın (1866–1952). She entered the Palace with her sister Tesrid Hanım, who became a consort of Şehzade Ibrahim Tevfik. She was very beautiful. She did not follow Abdul Hamid into exile and died in poverty. She had a daughter.
- Destizer Müşfika Kadın (1872 – 18 July 1961). She was Abkhazian, born Ayşe Hanim. She grew up with her sister under the tutelage of Pertevniyal Sultan, the mother of Sultan Abdülaziz, uncle of Abdul Hamid. She followed Abdul Hamid into exile and was with him until his death, so much so that it is said that the sultan died in her arms. She had a daughter.
- Sazkar Hanım (8 May 1873 – 1945). She was a noble Abkhazian, born Fatma Zekiye Hanım. She was among the consorts who followed Abdul Hamid into exile, and later left Turkey with her one daughter.
- Peyveste Hanım (1873 – 1943). Abkhazian princess, born Hatice Rabia Hanim and aunt of Leyla Açba. She served Nazikeda Kadın, with her sisters, and then became the treasurer of the harem. She was highly respected. She followed her husband into exile and then her one son.
- Pesend Hanım (13 February 1876 – 5 November 1924). Born princess Fatma Kadriye Achba, she was one of Abdul Hamid's favorite consorts, and was known for her kindness, charity, and tolerance. She was one of the consorts who stayed with Abdul Hamid until his death; and, on his death, she cut her hair and threw it into the sea as a sign of mourning. She had a daughter.
- Behice Hanım (10 October 1882 – 22 October 1969). She was Sazkar Hanım's cousin, her real name was Behiye Hanim. She was arrogant and proud, initially she had to marry Şehzade Mehmed Burhaneddin, son of Abdul Hamid, but in the end the sultan decided to marry her himself, against Behice's will. She had twin sons.
- Saliha Naciye Kadın (1887–1923). She was born Zeliha Ankuap and was also called Atike Naciye Kadın. Known for her kindness and modesty, she was Abdul Hamid's favorite among the consorts who stayed with him until his death. She had a son and a daughter.
- Dürdane Hanım (1869 - January 1957).
- Calibös Hanım (1890 - 1955).
- Simperver Nazlıyar Hanım.
- Bergüzar Hanım.
- Levandit Hanım.
- Ebru Hanım.
- Sermelek Hanım.
- Gevherriz Hanım.
- Mihrimend Zelide Hanım (? - 1946).
- Nevcedid Hanım.

=== Sons ===
Abdul Hamid had at least eight sons, including:

- Şehzade Mehmed Selim (1870 – 1937)
- Şehzade Mehmed Abdülkadir (1878 – 1944)
- Şehzade Ahmed Nuri (1878 – 1944)
- Şehzade Mehmed Burhaneddin (1885 – 1949)
- Şehzade Abdürrahim Hayri (1894 – 1952)
- Şehzade Ahmed Nureddin (1901 – 1944)
- Şehzade Mehmed Abid (1905 – 1973)

=== Daughters ===
Abdul Hamid had at least 13 daughters, including Zekiye Sultan (1872 – 1950), Naime Sultan (1876 – 1945), Naile Sultan (1884 – 1957), Şadiye Sultan (1886 – 1977), Hamide Ayşe Sultan (1887 – 1960), and Refia Sultan (1891 – 1938).

== In popular culture ==
- Abdul the Damned (1935) portrays a time near the end of the sultan's life.
- Barry Unsworth's historical novel The Rage of the Vulture (1982) portrays the paranoia of Abdul Hamid's at the twilight of his sultanate (May 1908 onwards)
- Payitaht Abdulhamid, named 'The Last Emperor' in English, is a Turkish popular historical television drama series depicting the last 13 years of the reign of Abdul Hamid II.
- In Orhan Pamuk's satirical novel Nights of Plague (2021), Abdul Hamid dispatches the Ottoman Empire's chief inspector of public health, along with a Muslim epidemiologist and his wife, the sultan's niece, to the fictitious island of Mingheria to combat the bubonic plague.

== Awards and honors ==
Ottoman orders

- Grand Master of the Order of the Crescent
- Grand Master of the Order of Glory
- Grand Master of the Order of the Medjidie
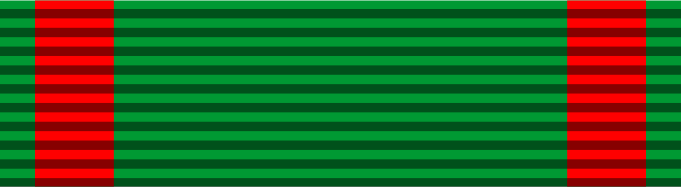
- Grand Master of the Order of Osmanieh

Foreign orders and decorations

- Knight Grand Cross of the Order of Saint Stephen, in Diamonds, 1881 (Austria-Hungary)
- Knight of the Order of the Elephant, 13 December 1884 (Kingdom of Denmark)
- Knight of the Order of the Seraphim, in Diamonds, 24 July 1879 (Kingdom of Sweden)
- Knight Grand Cross of the Order of Kamehameha I, July 1881 (Kingdom of Hawaii)
- Knight Grand Cross of the Order of Saint Olav, 11 February 1885 (Kingdom of Norway)
- Knight Grand Cross of the Order of the Tower and Sword (Kingdom of Portugal)
- Knight of the Order of the Golden Fleece, 19 December 1880 (Kingdom of Spain)
- Knight Grand Cross of the Order of the White Falcon, 1891 (Grand Duchy of Saxe-Weimar-Eisenach)
- Knight Grand Cross with Collar of the Order of Saint Alexander, 1897 (Principality of Bulgaria)
- Knight Grand Cross with Collar of the Order of Carol I, 1907 (Kingdom of Romania)
- Knight of the Order of the Annunciation, 29 November 1881 (Kingdom of Italy)
- Knight of the Order of the Black Eagle, in Diamonds, 3 February 1882 (German Empire)
- Knight of the Order of the Royal House of Chakri, 18 December 1892 (Kingdom of Siam)
- Knight Grand Cordon of the Order of the Chrysanthemum, 26 June 1888 (Empire of Japan)
- Knight of the Order of Saint Hubert, 1908 (Kingdom of Bavaria)

== Gallery ==
Threatened by several assassination attempts, Abdul Hamid II did not travel often (though still more than many previous rulers). Photographs provided visual evidence of what took place in his realm. He commissioned thousands of photographs of his empire, including from the Constantinople studio of Jean Pascal Sébah and his chief photographer, Ali Sami Bey. The sultan presented large gift albums of photographs to various governments and heads of state, including the U.S. and Great Britain. The American collection is housed in the Library of Congress and has been digitized.

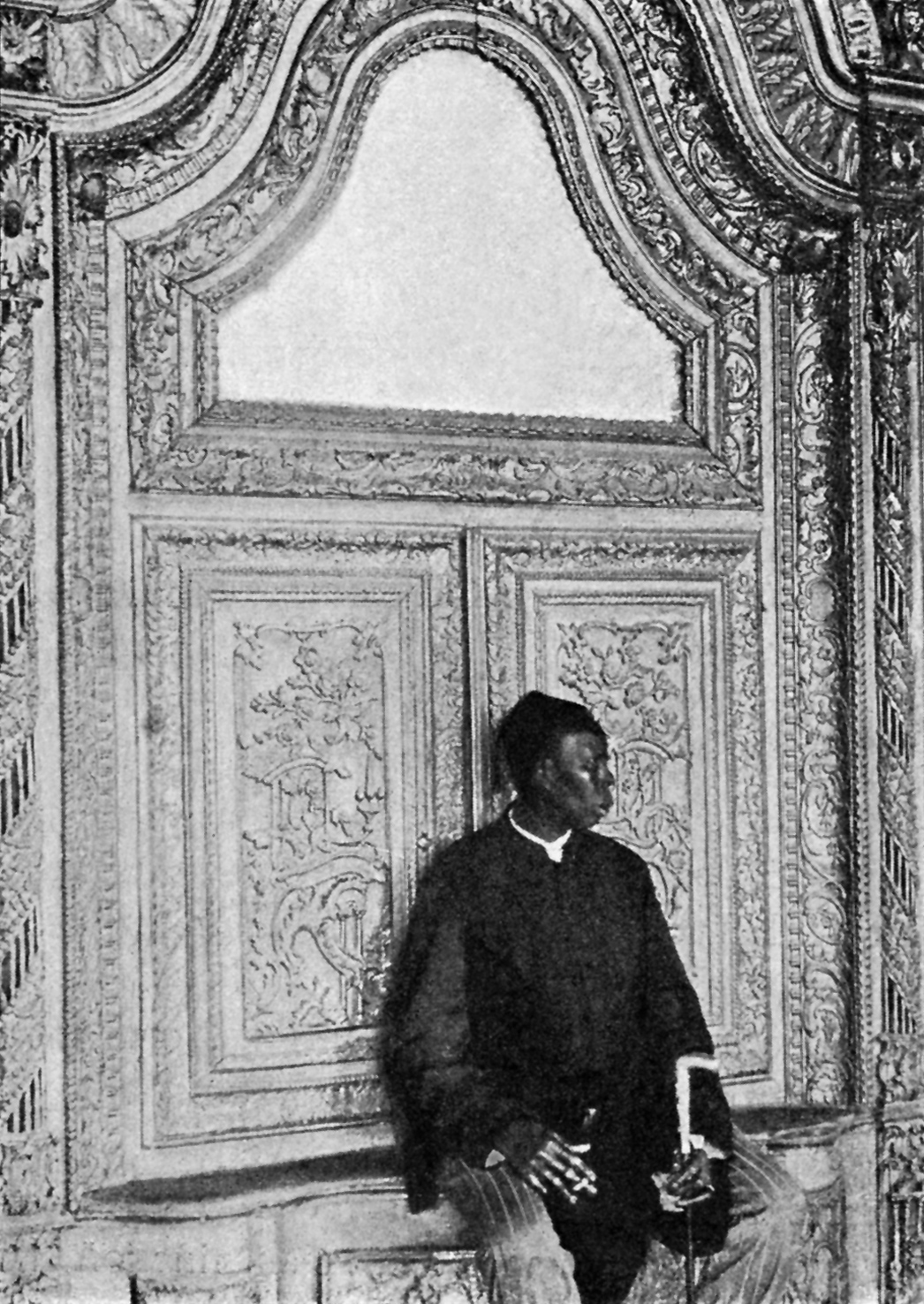
Eunuch near the door of the sultan's harem (from East and War by Vlas Doroshevich)

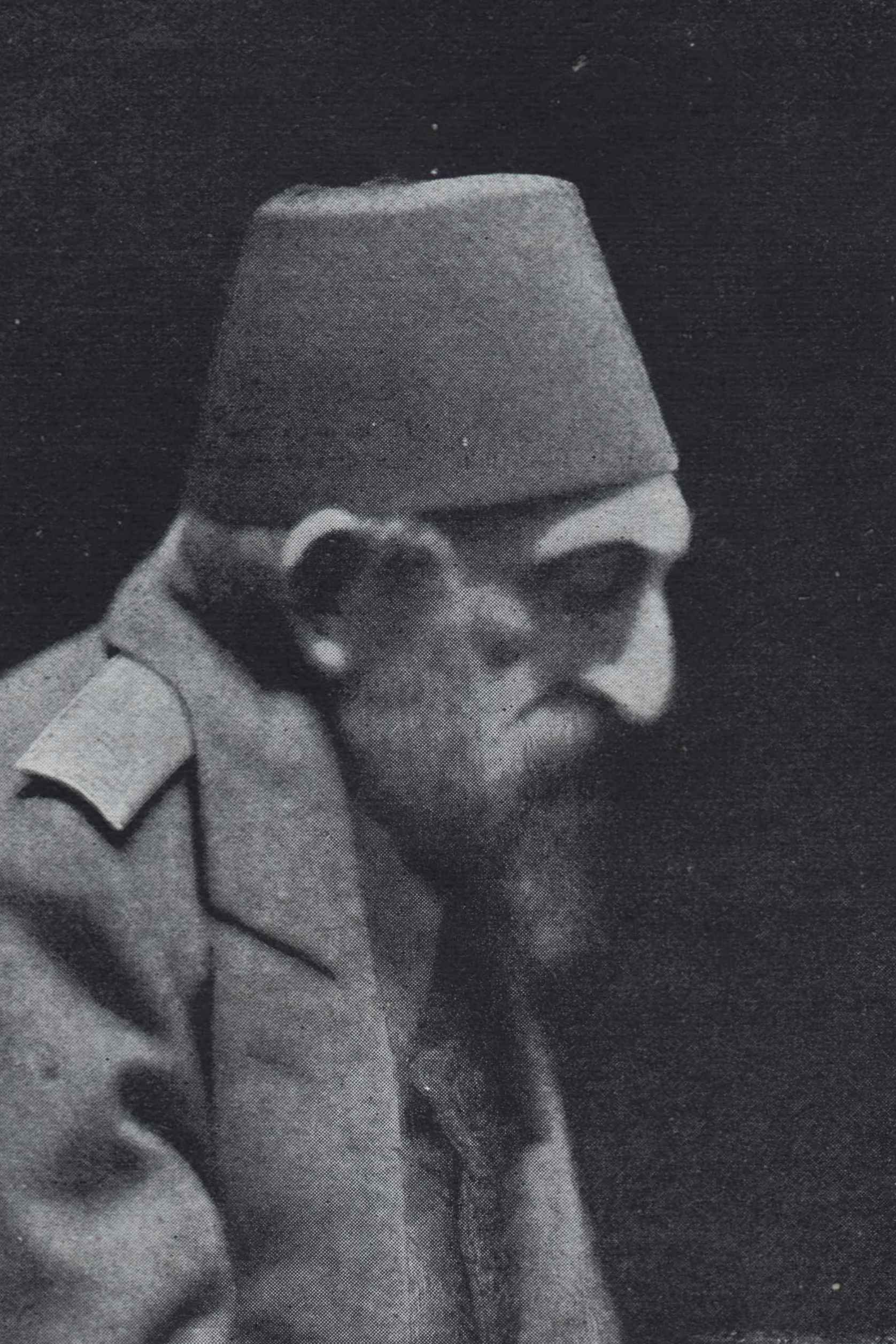
Abdul Hamid II, 1908 (L'Illustration)

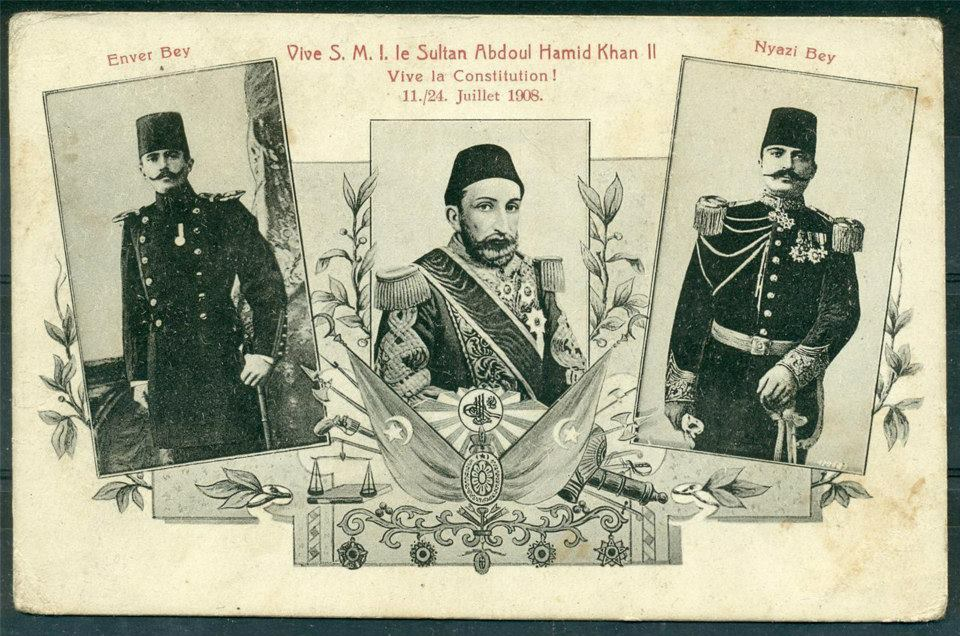
Enver Bey, Sultan Abdul Hamid II and Niyazi Bey

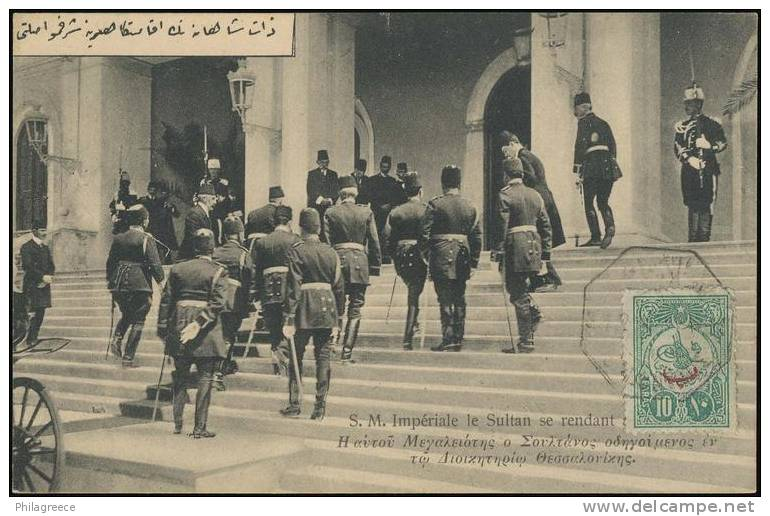
Abdul Hamid II arrives in Thessaloniki

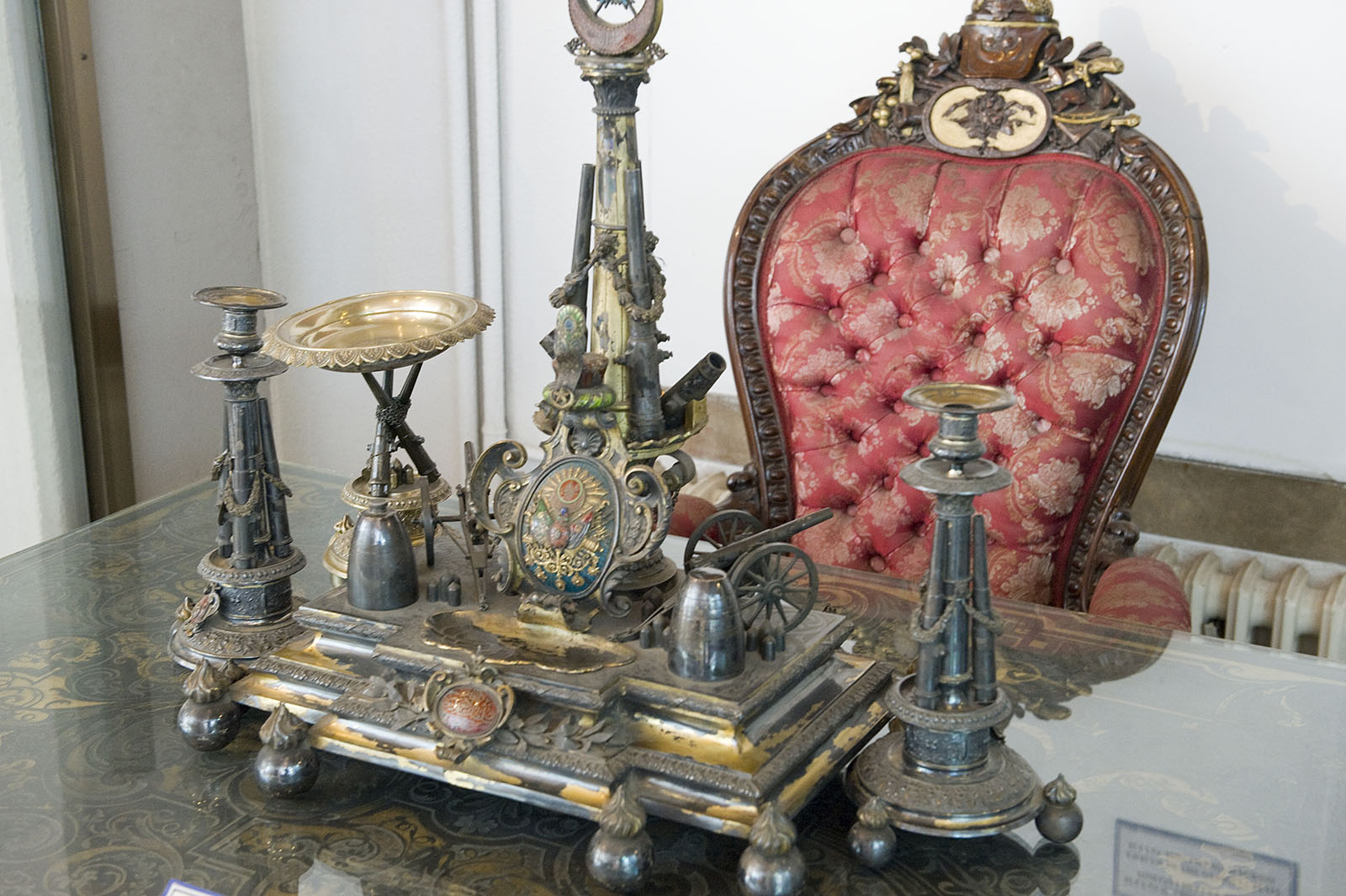
Istanbul Military Museum Abdulhamid II desk

== See also ==
- Yıldız Hamidiye Mosque
- Ottoman invasion of Persia (1906)
- Spyridon Mavrogenis
- Ali Suavi Incident
- Hamidian Period
- Wilhelm II's voyage to the Levant in 1898

== Notes ==
Abdul Hamid II House of Osman Born: 21 September 1842 Died: 10 February 1918
Regnal titles
Preceded by Murad V	Sultan of the Ottoman Empire; 31 August 1876 – 27 April 1909	Succeeded by Mehmed V
Sunni Islam titles
Preceded by Murad V	Caliph of the Ottoman Caliphate; 31 August 1876 – 27 April 1909	Succeeded by Mehmed V
