= Naile Sultan =

Naile Sultan may refer to:

- Naile Sultan (daughter of Abdulmejid I) (1856-1882), Ottoman Princess
- Naile Sultan (daughter of Abdul Hamid II) (1884-1957), Ottoman Princess
