= Nurefsun Kadın =

Consort of Ottoman Sultan Abdul Hamid II (c.1851–c.1908)

- Born: Ayşe Hanim c. 1850
- Died: 1915 (aged 64–65)
- Spouse: Abdul Hamid II (m. 1868; div. 1879) İkinci Esvapçı Saffet Bey
- Issue: Second marriage Fülan Bey
Names
- Turkish: Ayşe Safinaz Nurefsun Kadın; Ottoman Turkish: نورافسون قادین
- House: Şermet (by birth); Ottoman (by marriage)
- Father: Şermet Selim Bey
- Religion: Sunni Islam

Ayşe Safinaz Nurefsun Kadın (Ottoman Turkish: نورافسون قادین; "womanly", "the pure one" and "light charm"; c. 1850 – c. 1915), also called Nurefzun Kadın, was the second consort of Sultan Abdul Hamid II of the Ottoman Empire.

== Early life ==
Safinaz Nurefsun Kadın was born in 1850. Her real name was Ayşe Hanım. Her father was Şermet Selim Bey, who died while fighting the Russians. She had an elder sister, Yıldız Hanim, who became the last consort of Ottoman Sultan Abdülmejid I. She had been a servant in the household of Isma'il Pasha, the khedive of Egypt, who presented her to Sultan Abdulaziz. She had blonde hair, fair skin, and blue eyes, and was described as a beautiful woman. She was fond of playing the violin.

== Marriages ==
Nurefsun married Abdul Hamid as his second consort when he was a prince.

When her sister Yıldız Hanım married Abdülmejid I, Ayşe was sent to the household of Şehzade Abdülaziz (the future Sultan Abdülaziz), where she took the name Safinaz. According to Harun Açba, Abdülaziz was fascinated by her beauty and wanted to marry her, but she declined because she was in love with Şehzade Abdülhamid (the future Sultan Abdülhamid II). The feeling was mutual, and the young prince asked his adoptive mother Rahime Perestu Kadın for help. She told Abdülaziz that Safinaz was ill and that she needed a change of air; later, Abdülaziz was then falsely informed that she had died. Abdülhamid, therefore, secretly married Safinaz, now renamed Nurefsun, in October 1868.

She did not have any children. After Abdul Hamid's accession to the throne in 1876, she was given the title of "Second Consort". In 1877, Nurefsun and other members of the imperial family settled in the Yıldız Palace, after Abdul Hamid moved there on 7 April 1877.

However, Nurefsun could not get used to life in the harem and wanted to be Abdülhamid’s only wife. She therefore asked for a divorce. Abdul Hamid fulfilled her request, and she was granted a divorce in 1879. Afterwards, she married İkinci Esvapçı Saffet Bey, with whom she had a son, who towards the end of Abdul Hamid's reign became a secretary (mabeyn katibi) in the palace.

== Death ==
Ayşe Safinaz Nurefsun Kadın died in 1915.

== See also ==
- Kadın (title)
- Ottoman Imperial Harem
- List of consorts of the Ottoman sultans

== Sources ==
- Osmanoğlu, Ayşe (2000). Babam Sultan Abdülhamid. Mona Kitap Yayinlari. ISBN 978-6-050-81202-2.
