= Dilpesend Kadın =

Fifth consort of Ottoman Sultan Abdul Hamid II (1861–1901)

Dilpesend Kadınefendi
- Born: Azize Hanim; 16 January 1865; Tiflis, Tiflis Governorate, Russian Empire (now Tbilisi, Georgia)
- Died: 17 June 1901 (aged 36); Yıldız Palace, Constantinople, Ottoman Empire (now Istanbul, Turkey)
- Burial: Yahya Efendi Cemetery, Istanbul
- Spouse: Abdul Hamid II (m. 1883)
- Issue: Naile Sultan; Seniha Sultan
Names
- Turkish: Azize Dilpesend Kadın; Ottoman Turkish: دل پسند قادین آفندی
- House: Ottoman (by marriage)
- Father: Kızılbeg Maksud Giray Bey
- Mother: Esma Hanım
- Religion: Sunni Islam

Azize Dilpesend Kadınefendi (Ottoman Turkish: دل پسند قادین آفندی; "Highly Esteemed" and "Likeable to heart"; 16 January 1865 – 17 June 1901) was the fifth wife/consort (by order of marriage) of Sultan Abdul Hamid II of the Ottoman Empire. She was initially the "Fourth Kadınefendi" and later elevated to "Third Kadınefendi".

== Life ==
Of Georgian origin, Dilpesend Kadınefendi was born on 16 January 1865 in Tbilisi, Georgia. Born as Azize Hanim, she was the daughter of Kızılbeg Maksud Giray Bey and his wife Esma Hanım. She had a brother named Midhat Bey, and two sisters named Mestiahu Hanım and Pakize Hanım. From her father's side, she was a descendant of the Giray dynasty, Khan of Crimea, which was an Ottoman vassal until the annexation of Crimea in 1783.

== Personality ==
Dilpesend was tall, had dark brown-black hair, and a fair complexion. She was the tallest among Abdülhamid II's consorts and is remembered more for her charming and attractive stature and bearing than for her beauty. She is described as a quiet, gentle, modest, reserved and calm personality who kept to herself and was never found involved in harem jealousies and fights. She lived quietly with her only surviving child, Naile Sultan, in her own apartments in Yıldız Palace. She is the least known of Abdülhamid II's consorts, so much so that she is often confused with another consort with a similar name, Pesend Hanım. She is said not to be among Abdülhamid II's exceptionally favourite consorts, however she maintained her affectionate relationship with the Sultan and her honourable rank of a "Third Kadınefendi" until her death in 1901.

== Entry into the Imperial Household ==
Dilpesend was raised up in the palace under imperial manners and customs. Before her marriage to Abdülhamid II, she served in the entourage of Tiryal Hanım, the last consort of Sultan Mahmud II, grandfather of Abdülhamid II. After her death in 1883, as custom dictated, all of Tiryal Hanım's servants were transferred to Dolmabahçe Palace or Yıldız Palace, where Abdülhamid II looked at her and chose her as his consort.

== Marriage and Rank ==
Abdülhamid II and Dilpesend married on 10 April 1883, at the age of forty and eighteen respectively. This was Abdülhamid II's first marriage after his enthronement, and for this reason, it stands out among his other marriages. Upon marriage, she was given the title of "Fourth Kadınefendi". The marriage was based on personal choice of Abdülhamid II and he married her out of genuine affection and love. On 9 January 1884, a year after the marriage, she gave birth to her first child, a daughter, Naile Sultan, one of Abdülhamid II's most cherished children. A year later, in 1885 she gave birth to another daughter, Seniha Sultan, who died at the age of five months. In 1895, after the death Nazikeda Başkadınefendi, she was elevated to the title of "Third Kadinefendi", which remained hers until her death.

Naile Sultan, Dilpesend's daughter

== Death ==
In the summer of 1901, Dilpesend Kadınefendi fell seriously ill. Her illness is described as a cancer or kidney stones. It is said that the pain was so extreme, that morphine was requested from Abdülhamid II to ease her pain. Upon the administering of morphine, Dilpesend Kadınefendi died shortly, on 17 June 1901, at the age of thirty-six, in the Yıldız Palace leaving behind a seventeen year old Naile Sultan. She was buried in the Şehzadeler ve Kadınefendiler Türbesi, Yahya Efendi Cemetery, Istanbul.

31 Kânûn-ı Evvel 327 - 13 Kânûn-ı Sânî 912: Abdülhamid'i gördüm... Yine böbrek hizasından az ağrı var idi.. "Böbrek hastalığından bir kere daha mustarip olduğumu anlatmış idim... Naile Sultan'ın (...) validesi.. Kadınefendi onda da böbrek hastalığı var idi.. Hatta sebeb-i mevti oldu... Fakat morfin verdiler... Bence morfinden vefat etti.. İhtimal çok gelmiştir. O zamandan beri morfinden korkarım.. Selim Efendi'nin validesini de çok severdim.."

— Abdülhamid II, Atıf Hüseyin Bey, Sultan II. Abdülhamid'in Sürgün Günleri, s. 165

31 Kanun-i-Evvel 1327 - 13 January 1912: I saw Abdülhamid.. Again there was slight pain in the kidney area.. "I had told that I was suffering once more from kidney disease... Naile Sultan's (...) mother.. The Kadınefendi, she also had kidney disease... In fact, it was the cause of her death... But they gave her morphine... In my opinion, she died from the morphine... Probably too much was given. Since then, I have feared morphine.. I also loved Selim Efendi's mother very much.."

— Abdülhamid II, Atıf Hüseyin Bey, Sultan II. Abdülhamid'in Sürgün Günleri, p. 165

== Issue ==
Name	Birth	Death	Notes
Naile Sultan	9 January 1884	25 October 1957	married to Arif Hikmet Pasha, son of Sadrazam Abdurrahman Nüreddin Pasha, had a daughter who died in infancy.
Seniha Sultan	1885	1885	died at the age of five months

== In Literature ==
Dilpesend Kadınefendi is featured in the 2011 Turkish fictional novel "Sare Hanim: Bir Kadın Tanıdım Yaşarken (A Woman I Met While She Was Alive)" by Canan Doğu Demir, as the third wife of Sultan Abdülhamid II and the mother of Naile Sultan.

== See also ==
- Naile Sultan (daughter of Abdul Hamid II)
- Abdul Hamid II
- Kadın (title)
- Ottoman Imperial Harem
- List of consorts of the Ottoman sultans

== Sources ==
- Brookes, Douglas Scott (2010). The Concubine, the Princess, and the Teacher: Voices from the Ottoman Harem. University of Texas Press. ISBN 978-0-292-78335-5.
- Osmanoğlu, Ayşe (2000). Babam Sultan Abdülhamid. Mona Kitap Yayinlari. ISBN 978-6-050-81202-2.
- Sakaoğlu, Necdet (2008). Bu Mülkün Kadın Sultanları: Vâlide Sultanlar, Hâtunlar, Hasekiler, Kandınefendiler, Sultanefendiler. Oğlak Yayıncılık. ISBN 978-6-051-71079-2.
- Uluçay, M. Çağatay (2011). Padişahların kadınları ve kızları. Ötüken. ISBN 978-975-437-840-5.
- Hüseyin Bey, Atıf (2008). Sultan II. Abdülhamid'in Sürgün Günleri, Hususi Doktoru Atıf Hüseyin Bey'in Hatıraları (1909-1918). Metin Hulagu. ISBN 978-975-843-455-8.
