= Ertuğrul Tekke Mosque =

Mosque in Beşiktaş, Istanbul, Turkey

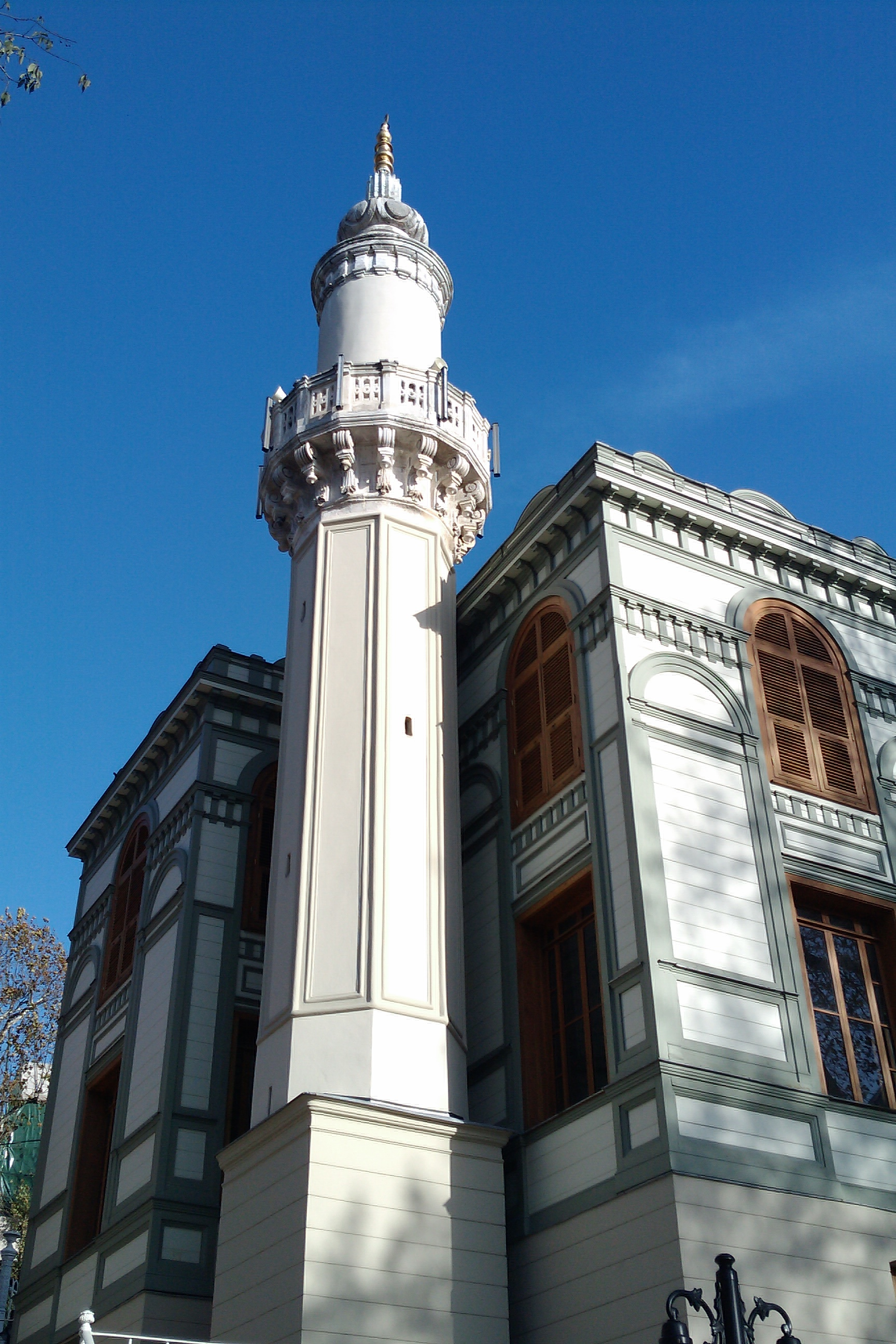
- Ertuğrul Tekke Mosque in 2010

Religion
- Affiliation: Islam

Location
- Location: Istanbul, Turkey
- Interactive map of Ertuğrul Tekke Mosque
- Coordinates: 41°02′44″N 29°00′30″E

Architecture
- Type: Mosque
- Style: Ottoman architecture
- Completed: 1887
- Minaret: 1

The Ertuğrul Tekke Mosque (Turkish: Ertuğrul Tekke Camii) is an Ottoman imperial mosque located in Yıldız neighbourhood, Serencebey rise of Beşiktaş district in Istanbul, Turkey. A late Ottoman period mosque, it is constructed as a külliye consisting of an Ottoman takya (tekye or tekke in Turkish), guest house, türbe, fountain, and library in addition to the mosque.

== History ==
The construction of the mosque and the külliye complex was commissioned by Ottoman sultan Abdul Hamid II, and finished in 1887. The original architect is not known. It is dedicated to the founder of the Medeni branch of Shadhili (Turkish: Şaziliye) tariqa, a Libyan Sufi, Sheikh Hamza Zafir. The mosque is named after Ertuğrul Gazi, the father of the founder of the Ottoman Empire, Osman I, as a commendation to him. The name also comes from the Ertuğrul Regiment, a royal palace guard regiment which comprised Turks from the Domaniç region. Initially the complex only consisted of the mosque, tekke, and the guesthouse. After the death of Sheikh Hamza Zafir in 1903, his türbe was constructed next to the mosque by the Italian architect Raimondo D'Aronco between 1905 and 1906. The library and the fountain were also added in this expansion. After the passing of Sheikh Hamza Zafir, his two brothers Muhammed Zafir Efendi and Beşir Zafir Efendi became the sheikhs of the tekke. They are also buried in the türbe next to their elder brother.

The complex is mainly built as a guesthouse to various sheikhs and Islamic scholars that used to visit Istanbul from the Islamic world in an effort to strengthen the power of the position of the Caliphate in the Islamic world.

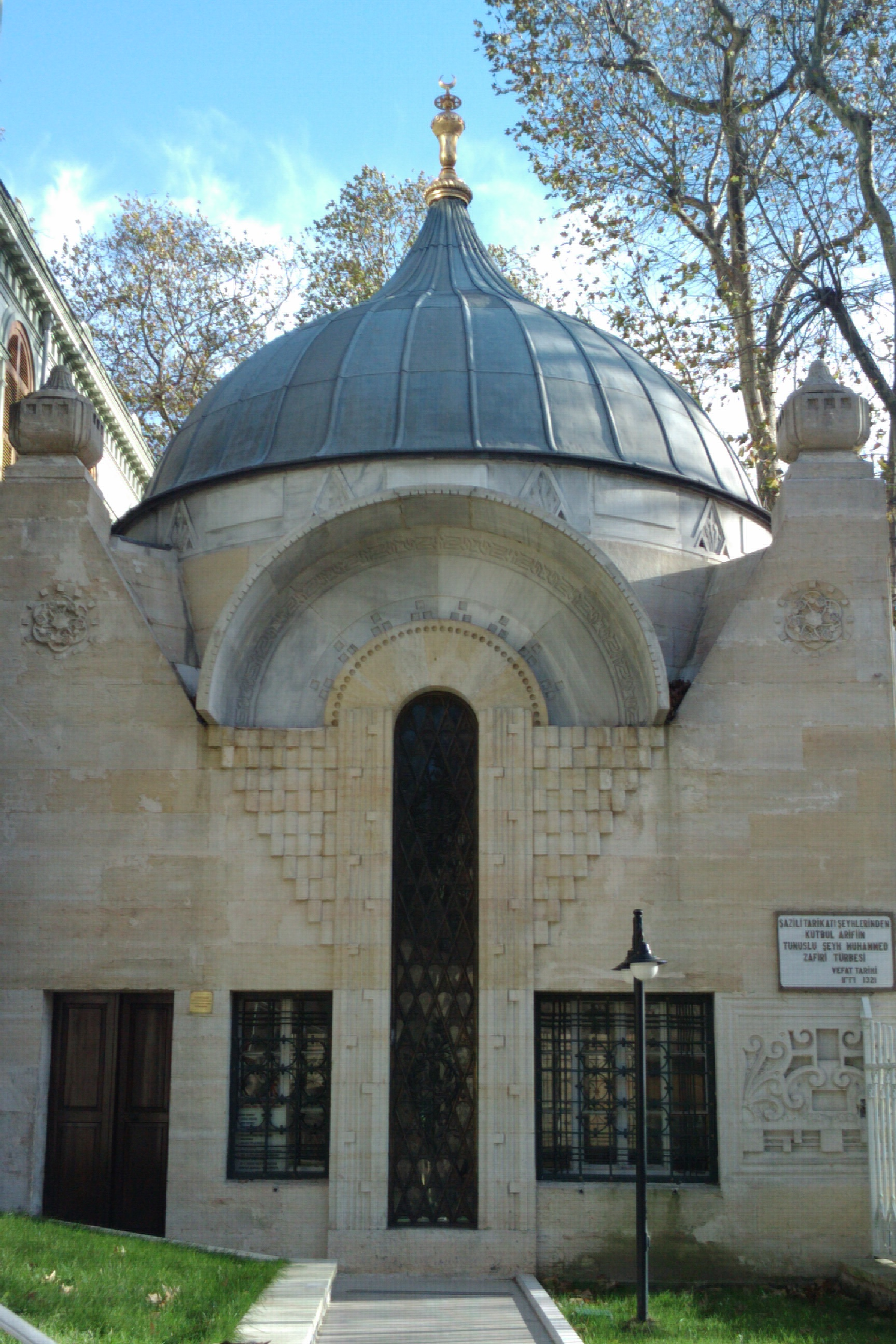
Exterior view of the Sheikh Zafir türbe next to the mosque

After the abolition of tekkes in 1925, the mosque and tekke were closed and the two guesthouse buildings were used as a primary school, Şair Nedim Primary School. Due to extensive wear over the years, all the buildings were closed in 1960. The mosque was restored between 1969 and 1973 by the General Directorate for Foundations of the Republic of Turkey and was opened to the public in 1973. Recently, all the buildings except the guesthouses have undergone another restoration process. The restoration started in 2008 and lasted for two years. The mosque and türbe opened to the public on 21 May 2010 by President Abdullah Gül. As of 2010, both guesthouses are currently in a ruined state and not in use.

== Architecture ==
The mosque and the guesthouses are wooden constructions and represents the classical architecture of the late Ottoman period. The türbe, library, and the fountain are built in the Art Nouveau style.

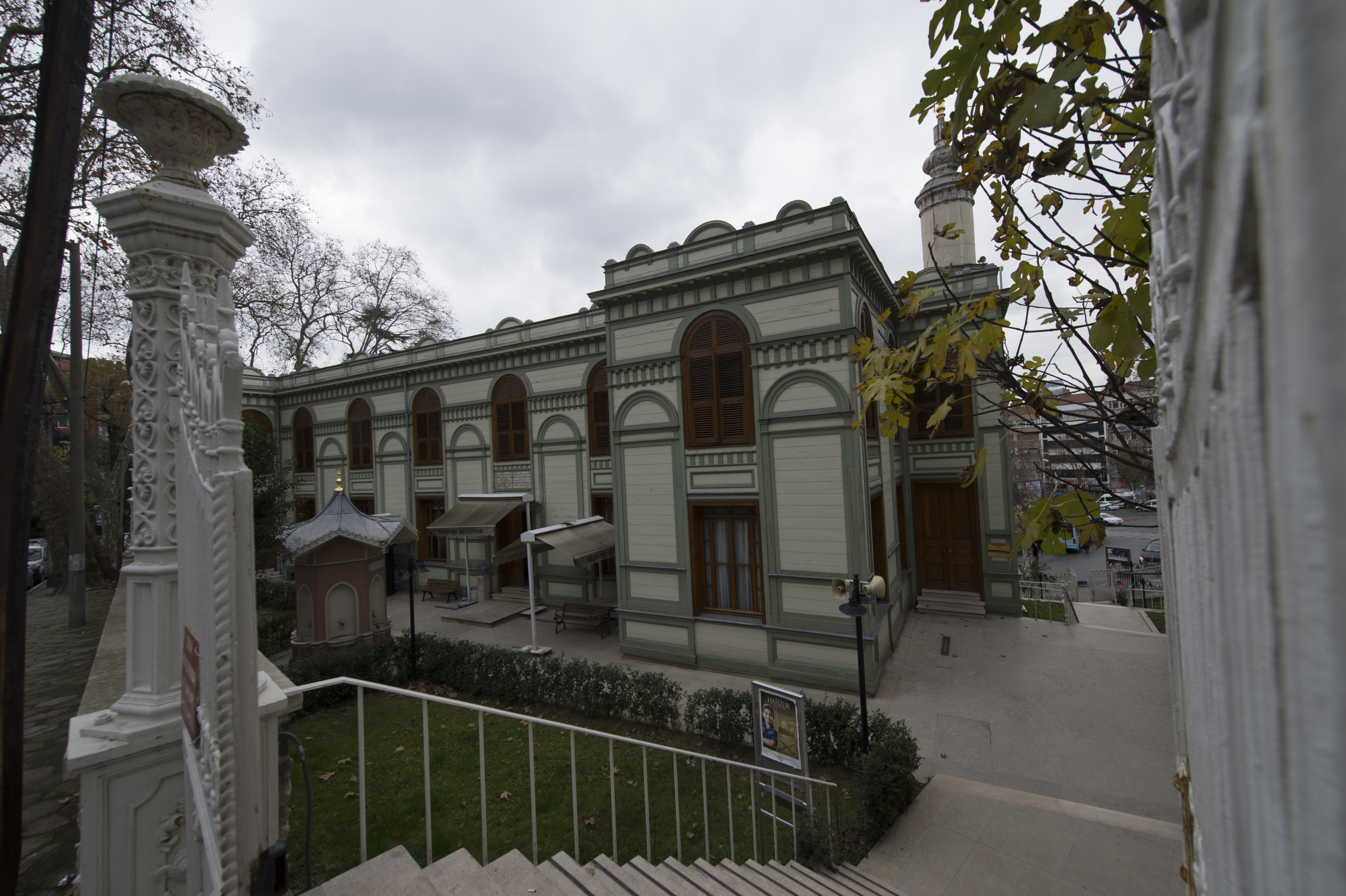
Istanbul Sheikh Zafir complex from front side

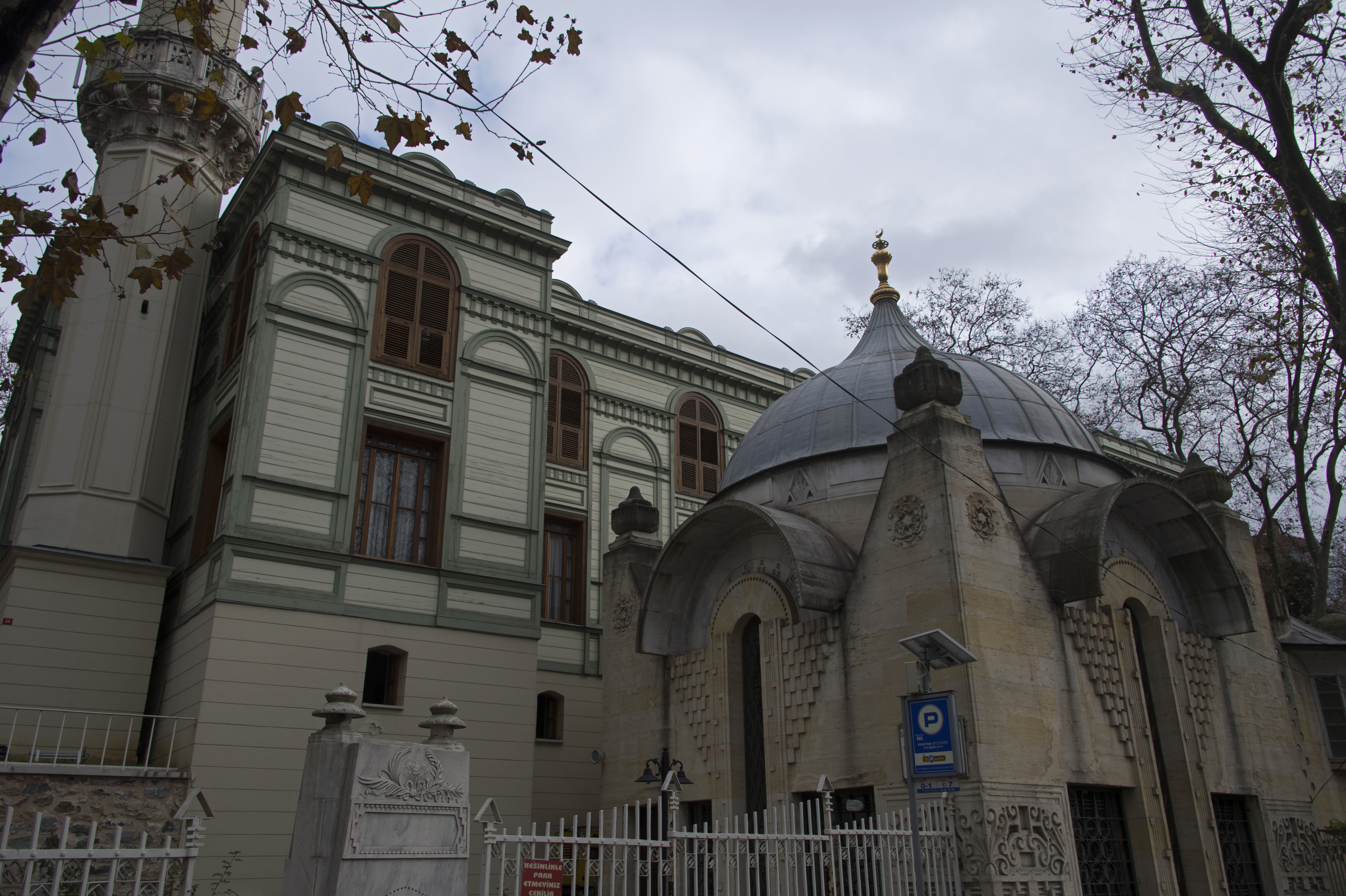
Istanbul Sheikh Zafir complex with türbe

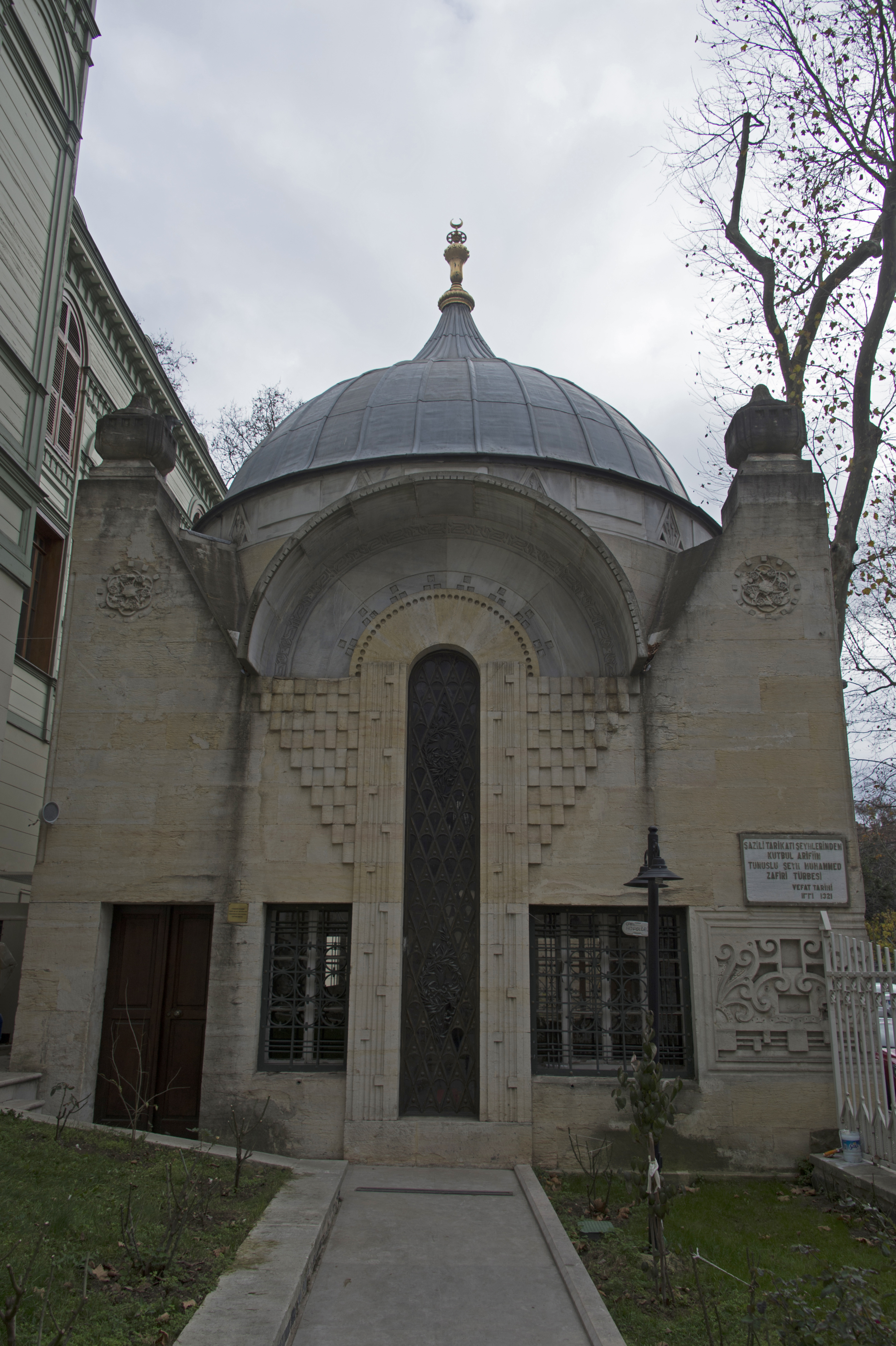
Istanbul Sheikh Zafir complex: türbe

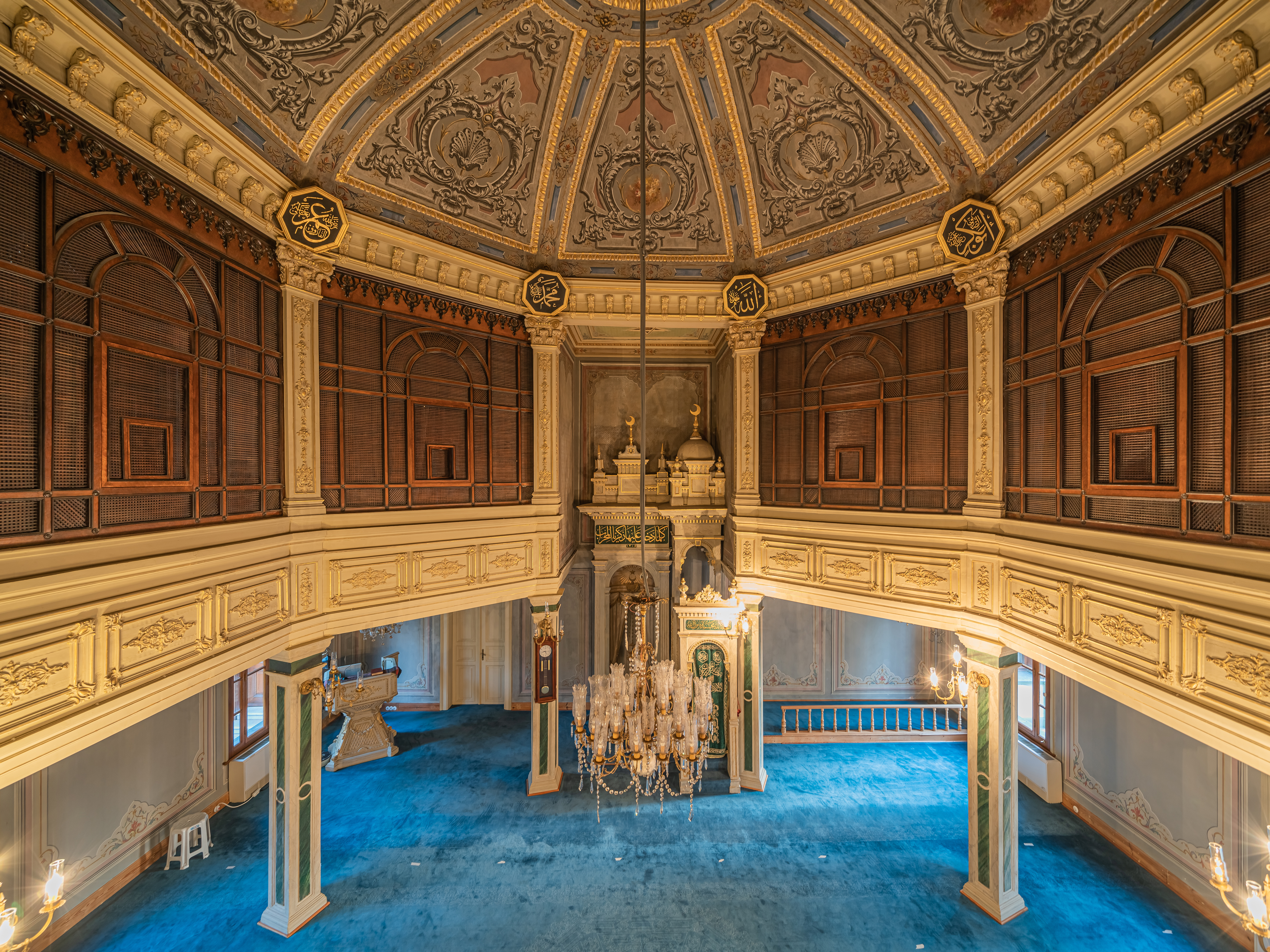
Istanbul Sheikh Zafir complex inside mausoleum

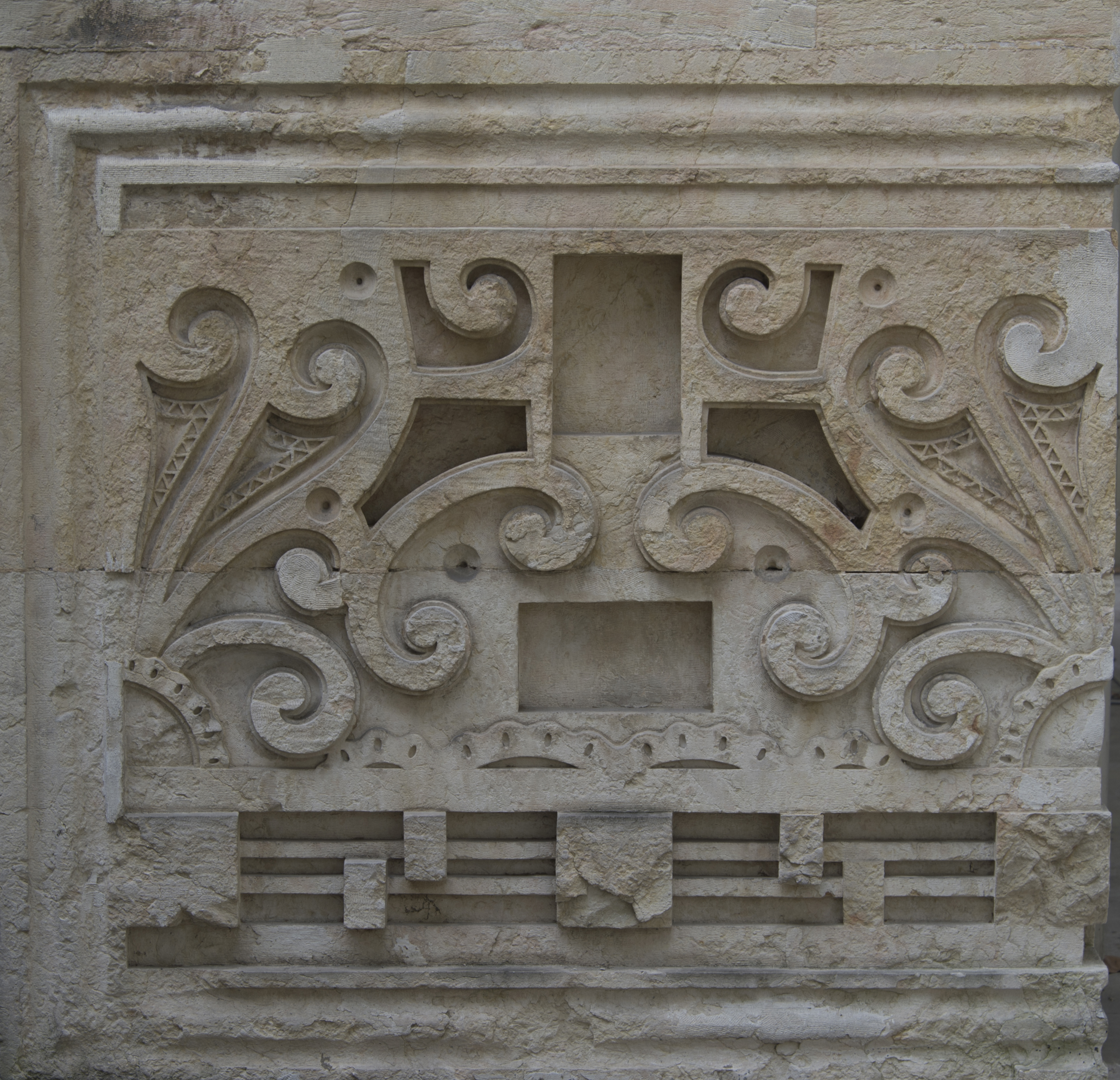
Istanbul Sheikh Zafir complex decoration

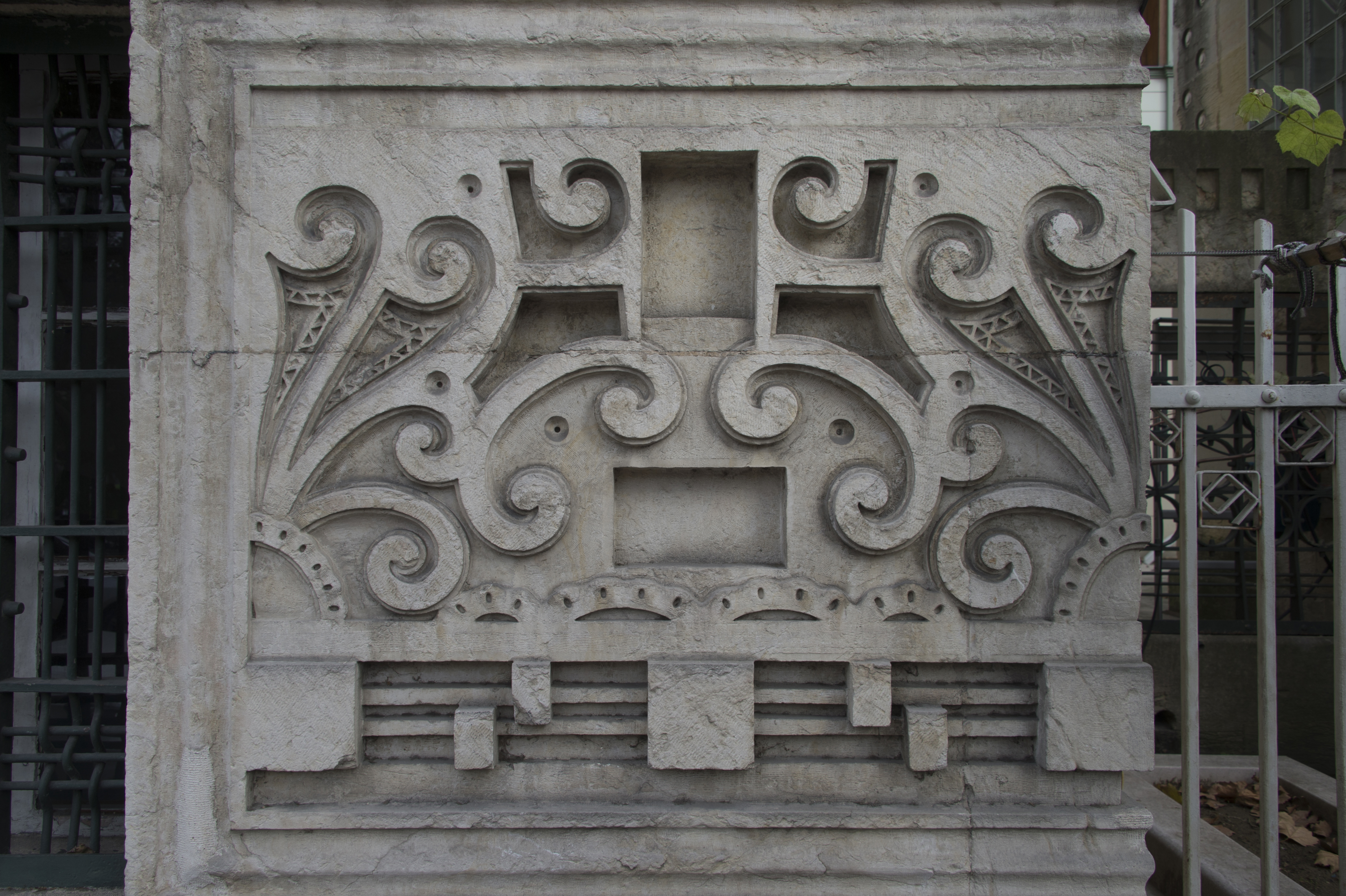
Istanbul Sheikh Zafir complex decoration

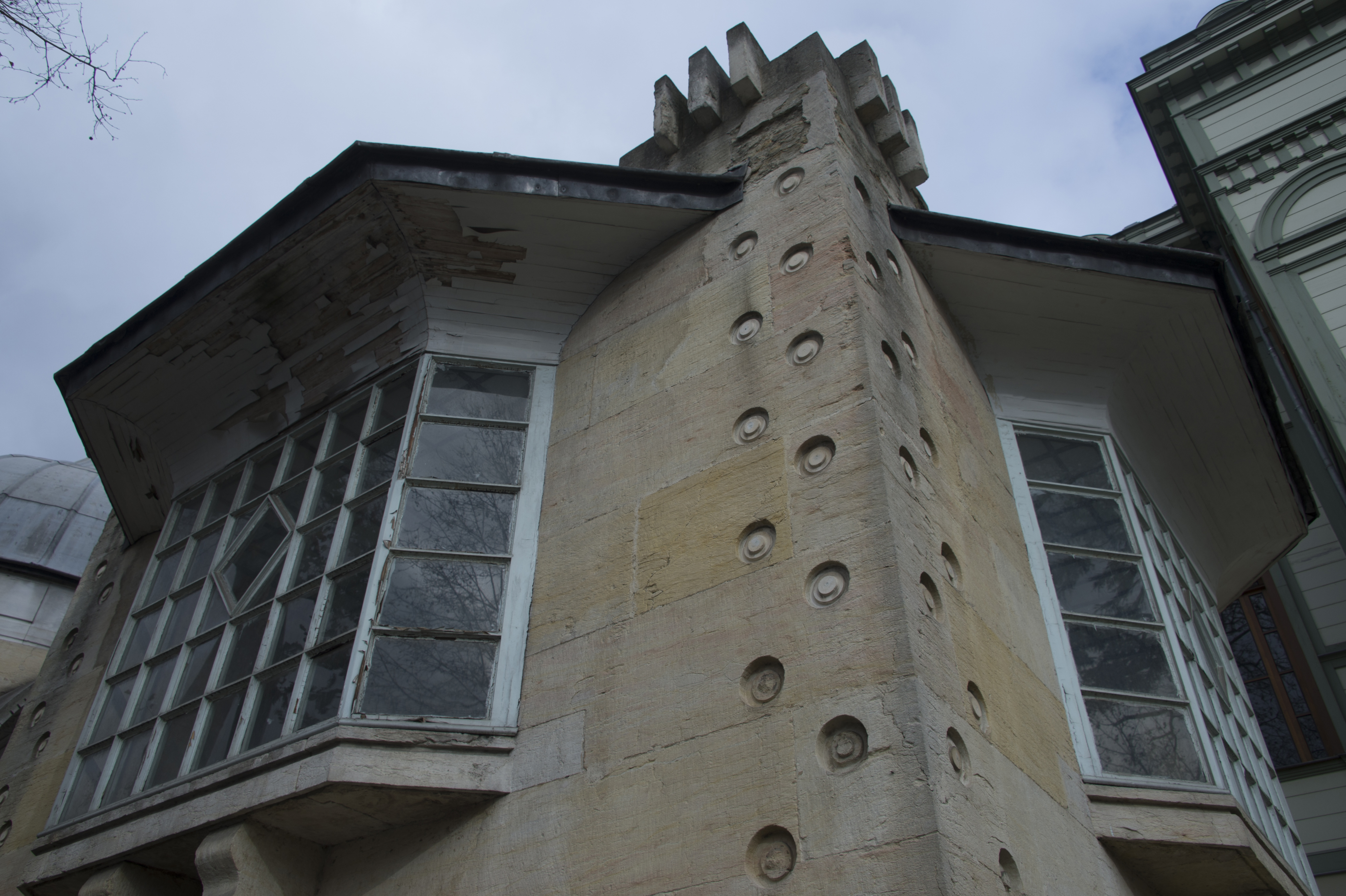
Istanbul Sheikh Zafir complex decoration

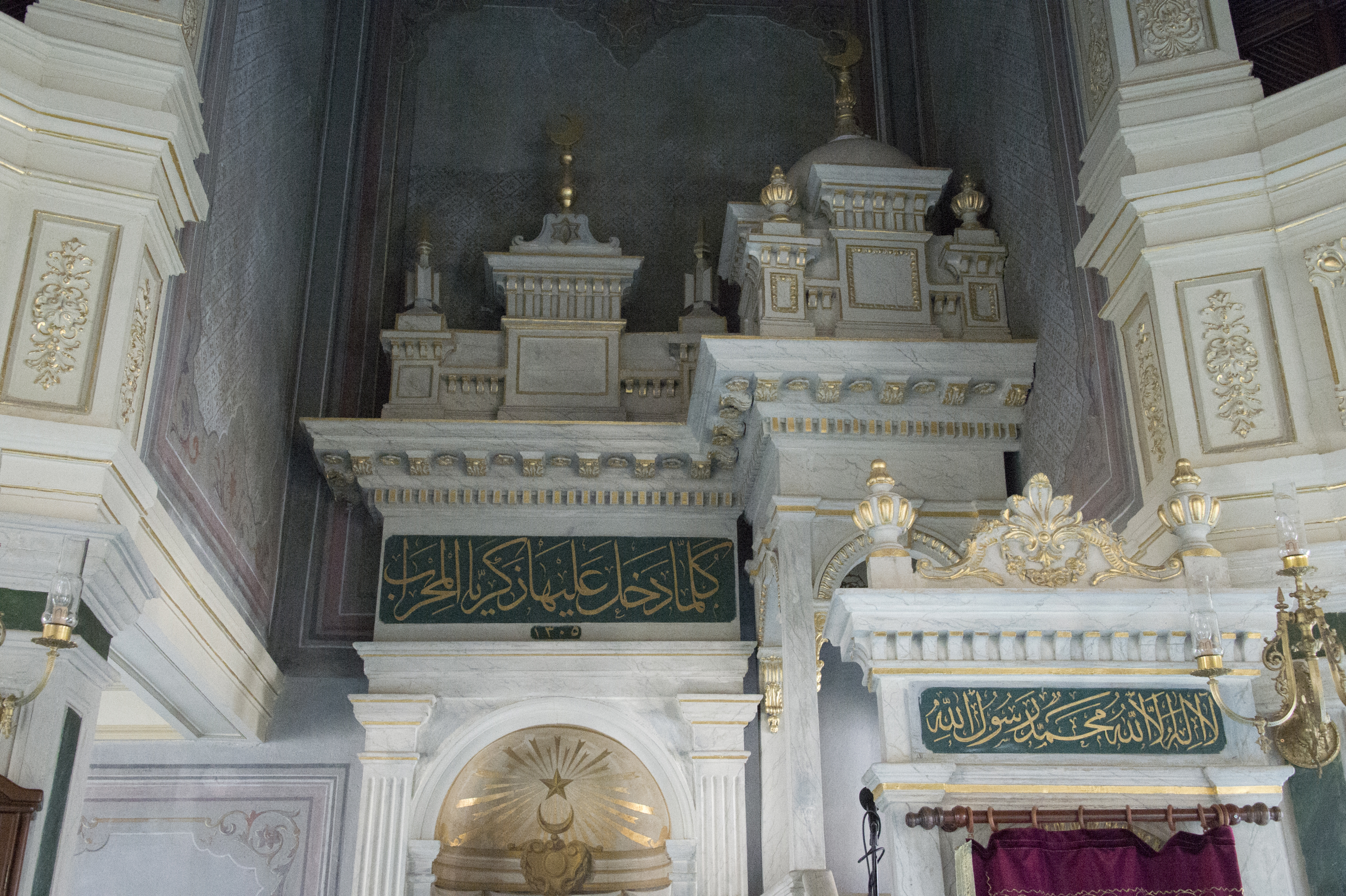
Sheikh Zafir complex Inside the tekke

== See also ==
- List of mosques
- Ottoman architecture
