= Sedentarization of Kurdish tribes =

Policy of permanent settlement of Kurds

Sedentarization of Kurdish tribes was a policy pursued by the Ottoman Empire as early as the sixteenth century and became prominent in the nineteenth century. This policy was also pursued by the Committee of Union and Progress, Turkey, as well as Iran in the nineteenth and twentieth centuries, in order to limit the movement of nomadic Kurds.

== Sedentarization within the Ottoman Empire ==
This policy was conceived in the Ottoman Empire through the empire's centralizing program leading nomadic hereditary Kurdish rulers to lose power and be sedentarized. Many nomads were settled into villages of Armenian peasants, leading to tension between the two groups. This tension was often exacerbated when Kurds were able to gain power in administrative roles. The goals of sedentarization of nomadic Kurdish Tribes in the Ottoman Empire were pursued on the basis of nomadic groups being a threat to central authority. Additionally, sedentarization was implemented in order to regain control over taxation of Kurdish tribes. Prior to sedentarization, taxation was overseen by Tribal leaders, and therefore not within a direct sphere of control of Ottoman administrators. Agricultural taxation was one of the most significant forms of revenue within the Ottoman Empire, hence the desire by Ottoman Statesmen to have more direct control. Another proposed reason for sedentarization was to control violence that Kurdish nomads were inflicting on Ottoman people, although it is likely that these beliefs were based on stereotypes of nomadic people. Although there were efforts to centralize and sedentarize these groups for centuries, but it was not until the sixteenth century that these efforts became more prominent.

== Tanzimat Reforms ==
This policy was a part of the Tanzimat Reforms of from 1839 to 1869. The Tanzimat Reforms revolved around security, military and modernized taxation within the Ottoman Empire. Although these reforms were part of a centralizing program, sedentarization was an important part of this policy. These reforms also came to be most prominent in the 19th century with the Tanzimat Reforms, where the sedentarization efforts became more systemized. The systemization of the Tanzimat Reforms in regard to effectiveness also seemed to draw upon past mistakes in attempts at sedentarization. Additionally, the process of reforms and implementation were adjusted accordingly to the responses they faced in different regions. That being said they inflicted more restrictions in order to keep the movement of nomadic Kurds under control. This included the policy that nomadic Kurds must settle in winter pastures or summer pastures.

== Means of implementation ==
There was often resistance to sedentarization by many Kurdish Tribes. This resistance came in different forms, which led the Ottoman statesmen to utilize different means to implement their policies. These means often included either mediation or coercion. Aside from resistance, Ottoman statesmen also might have used the means of mediation and coercion because of the geopolitical locations. This was especially the case for regions of Kurdish tribes that moved near borders, where Ottoman statesmen were more concerned about centralizing their control in regions close to other states. There was also a significant emphasis on the discouragement of tribalism as a means of sedentarization. This was because of the inherent connection and interrelation with nomadism.

=== Effects of sedentarization ===
The post-sedentarization era created a lot of consequences that arose from the adjustment of nomadic Kurds into sedentary life. Some of these consequences may have included the loss of culture and traditions.

=== Notable tribes ===
There were countless tribes of nomadic Kurdish tribes subject to sedentarization at the hands of Ottoman statesmen. One being the Risvan Tribe, and another the Asfar Tribe. These tribes were both powerful and influential, which led Ottoman Statesmen to exhort more control. Ottoman officials did this through mediation by appointing certain tribe leaders to control summer and winter pastures of the tribes. This was a tool to further centralize the Ottoman's power.

== Sedentarization within Iran ==
The Reza Shah Pahlavi of Iran implemented policies of sedentarization starting early on in his reign, as early as the 1920s. This policy was implemented by the Iranian Government in order to accelerate modernization within the country. It was believed by the Shah and the Iranian Government that the nomadic Kurds were resistant to the political, social and economic changes they wished to implement within the country, and their nomadic lifestyles were impeding their acceptance to these changes.

The specific policies of sedentarization in Iran is not thoroughly documented, leading scholars to believe that sedentarization occurred slowly in different areas of Iranian Kurdistan. Policies of sedentarization within Iran stem from the wish to strip autonomy from Kurds, which became a fear from Kurdish Nationalist movements. The Iranian Government therefore used sedentarization as a part of their policies to demographically engineer the country.

== See also ==
- Sedentism

== Sources ==
- Dede, Suat (2011). From Nomadism to Sedentary Life in Central Anatolia: the Case of Rışvan Tribe (1830–1932) (Thesis). hdl:11693/15212. ProQuest 2652591657.
