= Ottoman Decree of 1296 =

The Ottoman Decree of 1296 (Turkish: Meskûkât-ı Osmaniye Kararnamesi), was a decree concerning monetary systems of the Ottoman Empire. This decree established a bimetallic currency system based on gold and silver in the year 1296 AH (1880 AD).
