= Naile Sultan (daughter of Abdul Hamid II) =

Ottoman princess, daughter of Abdul Hamid II (1884–1957)

- Born: 9 January 1884; Yıldız Palace, Istanbul, Ottoman Empire
- Died: 25 October 1957 (aged 73); Erenköy, Kadıköy, Istanbul, Turkey
- Burial: Yahya Efendi Cemetery, Istanbul, Turkey
- Spouse: Arif Hikmet Pasha (m. 1905; died 1944)
- Dynasty: Ottoman
- Father: Abdul Hamid II
- Mother: Dilpesend Kadın
- Religion: Sunni Islam

Naile Sultan (Ottoman Turkish: نائله سلطان; 9 January 1884 – 25 October 1957) was an Ottoman princess, the daughter of Sultan Abdul Hamid II and Dilpesend Kadın.

== Early life ==
Naile Sultan was born on 9 January 1884 in the Yıldız Palace. Her father was Sultan Abdul Hamid II, son of Abdulmejid I and Tirimüjgan Kadın. Her mother was Dilpesend Kadın, daughter of Kızılbeg Maksud Giray Bey and Esma Hanım. She was the sixth child, and fourth daughter of her father and the first child of her mother. She had a younger sister, Seniha Sultan, who died at five months. She was named after her paternal aunt, Naile Sultan, died in 1882.

Naile was a pianist, harpist, and violist. Her music teacher was Lombardi Bey. She displayed these skills during the visit of the German Emperor Wilhem II and his wife Empress Augusta Victoria to Istanbul in 1889, with her half-sister eight years older Naime Sultan. Upon returning to her country, the Empress relayed that they left Istanbul with good memories and that Naile's musical talent was remarkable for her age. The empress also sent her gifts of toys.

In 1901, Abdul Hamid betrothed her to Cemaleddin Bey, third son of Gazi Osman Pasha and Zatıgül Hanım, a lady formerly in the harem of Sultan Abdulaziz, whose elder sons, Nureddin Pasha and Kemaleddin Pasha had been married to Naile's elder half-sisters, princesses Zekiye Sultan and Naime Sultan, respectively. However, in 1904, following Kemaleddin Pasha's affair with her cousin, Princess Hatice Sultan, the daughter of Sultan Murad V, the engagement was broken off.

== Marriage ==
In 1905, Abdul Hamid arranged Naile's marriage to Arif Hikmet Pasha, the son of grand vizier Abdurrahman Nurettin Pasha. The marriage took place on 27 February 1905 in the Kuruçeşme Palace. He became Damat. The couple were given the palace of Kuruçeşme as their residence. No children came of this marriage. Her husband was a very kind and noble person. He never worked with a sense of greed and interest, and the two lived a very happy life.

== Life in exile ==
Upon the exile of the imperial family in March 1924, the couple settled in Beirut, Lebanon. Here, Naile Sultan lived in a truly oriental manner. Both she and her husband were wealthy, and had managed to lead the same kind of life they had in Istanbul. They lived a very comfortable life in their home, which was divided into a harem and a selamlik.

The Pasha would use his office as a selamlik, where he would welcomed his guests. On the other hand, Naile Sultan would not leave the harem, and would not receive any male visitors. The only man that ever entered the harem was the husband of her sister princess Refia Sultan.

== Later years and death ==
Arif Hikmet Pasha died in 1944, and in 1952, Naile Sultan returned to Istanbul after the revocation of the law of exile for princesses. Here she settled in Erenköy, and died on 25 October 1957 at the age of seventy-three. She was buried in Yahya Efendi Cemetery, Istanbul.

== Honours ==
Styles of Naile Sultan
- Reference style: Her Imperial Highness
- Spoken style: Your Imperial Highness

- Order of the House of Osman
- Order of the Medjidie, Jeweled
- Order of Charity, 1st Class
- Hicaz Demiryolu Medal in Gold
- Iftikhar Sanayi Medal in Gold

== See also ==
- List of Ottoman princesses

== Sources ==
- Brookes, Douglas Scott (2010). The Concubine, the Princess, and the Teacher: Voices from the Ottoman Harem. University of Texas Press. ISBN 978-0-292-78335-5.
- Sakaoğlu, Necdet (2008). Bu mülkün kadın sultanları: Vâlide sultanlar, hâtunlar, hasekiler, kadınefendiler, sultanefendiler. Oğlak Yayıncılık. ISBN 978-9-753-29623-6.
- Uluçay, Mustafa Çağatay (2011). Padişahların kadınları ve kızları. Ankara: Ötüken. ISBN 978-9-754-37840-5.
- Uru, Cevriye (2010). Sultan II. Abdülhamid'in kızı Zekiye Sultan'in Hayatı (1872-1950) (Master Thesis) (in Turkish). Marmara University Institute of Social Sciences. Archived from the original on 2022-01-17.
