= Osman Nuri Pasha =

Ottoman field marshal (1832–1900)

Mushir Gazi Osman Nuri Pasha
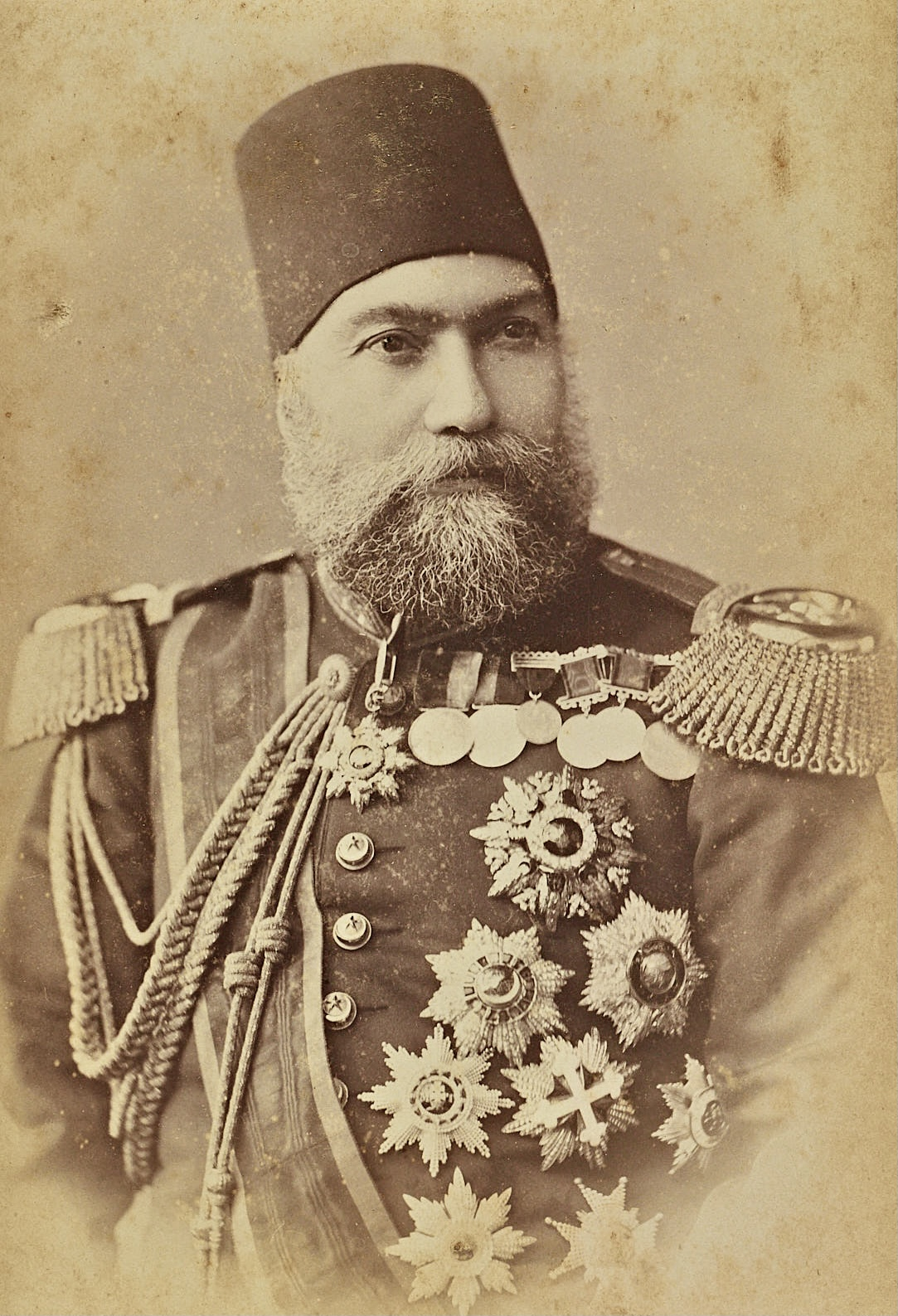
- Marshal Gazi Osman Pasha, 1895. Photograph by Abdullah Frères.
- Born: 1832; Tokat, Rûm Eyalet, Ottoman Empire
- Died: 5 April 1900 (aged 67–68); Istanbul, Ottoman Empire
- Burial place: Fatih Mosque, Istanbul, Turkey; 41°1′11″N 28°56′59″E
- Military career
- Allegiance: Ottoman Empire
- Branch: Ottoman Army
- Rank: Field Marshal
- Nickname: Marshal of the Palace
- Conflicts: Cretan revolt (1866–1869); First Serbian–Ottoman War; Second Serbian–Ottoman War; Crimean War; Battle of the Chernaya; Russo-Turkish War (1877–1878); Siege of Plevna; First Battle of Plevna

Osman Nuri Pasha (Ottoman Turkish: عثمان نوری پاشا; 1832 – 4 to 5 April 1900), also known as Gazi Osman Pasha (Turkish: Gazi Osman Paşa), was an Ottoman Turkish field marshal. Being one of the most respected and decorated Ottoman pashas of all time, many songs have been written for him, and many places named after him. This is mainly because he held the Bulgarian town of Plevna for five months against superior Russo-Romanian forces in 1877 during the Russo-Turkish War, though the city eventually fell.

== Early life and education ==
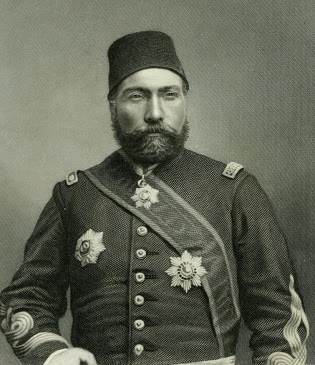
Osman Pasha in the early days of his military career

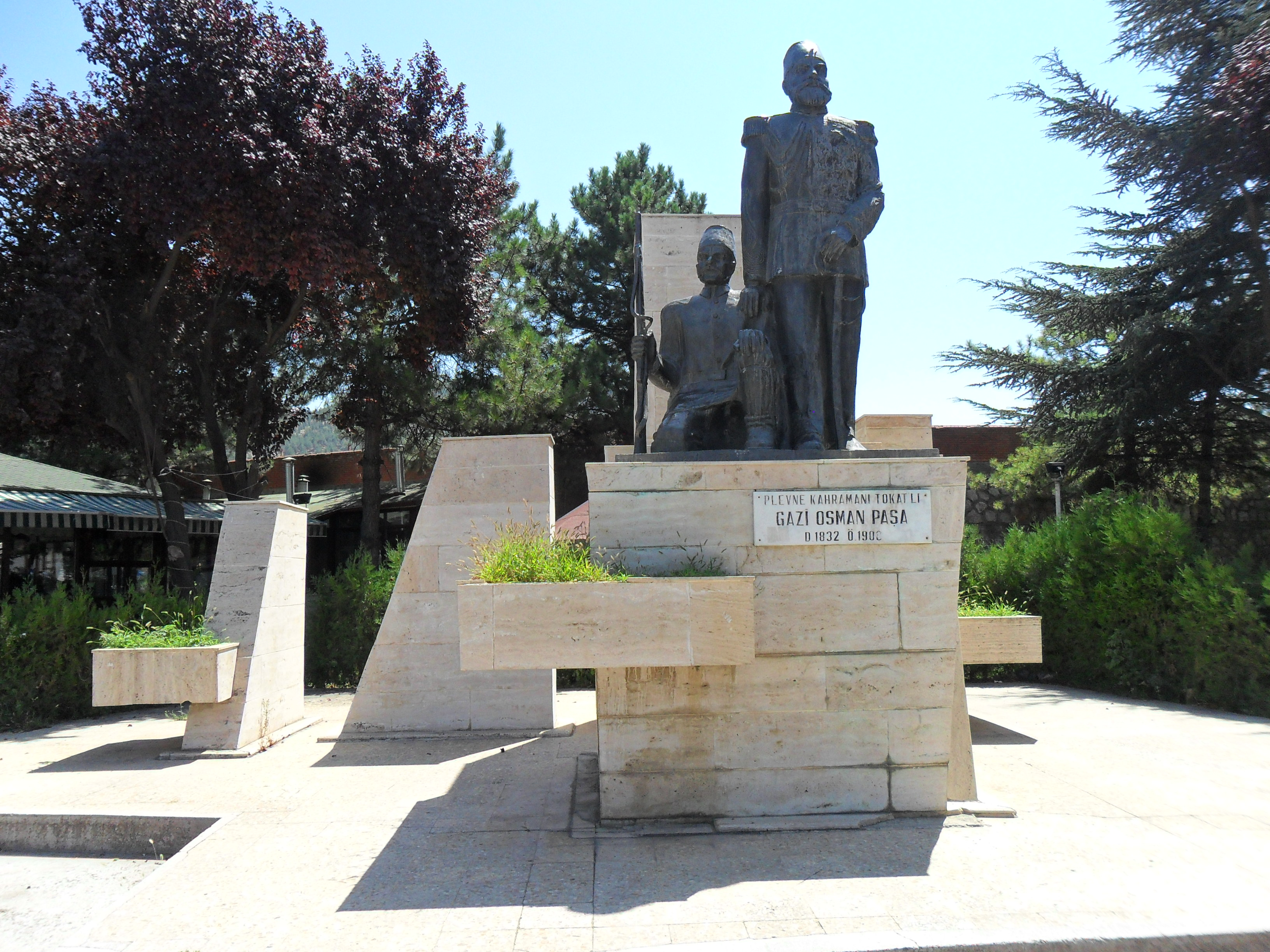
Statue of Osman Pasha in Tokat

Osman Nuri was born into the prominent Muslim Turkish Yağcıoğulları family in the city of Tokat. His father was a civil worker who, soon after Osman's birth, was appointed to a position in the Ottoman capital, so the family moved to Constantinople (now Istanbul).

Osman attended the Kuleli Military High School and then graduated from the Ottoman Military College in 1852 as a lieutenant, entering the Cavalry Arm at the beginning of the Crimean War.

== Military career ==
He entered the Cavalry Arm at the beginning and served in the Crimean War, where his bravery secured him a promotion as first lieutenant. After the end of the war, Osman was appointed to the General Staff and, a year later, had risen to the rank of captain with the title of Bey. In 1859 he was appointed as a military representative in the forming of the cadastral and census map of the Ottoman Empire, a job he fulfilled for the next two years.

In 1861, Osman was sent to Beirut Vilayet, where a rebellion had been started by Yusuf Ekrem in Syria. In 1866 he was dispatched to another troubled area of the Empire, Crete, which was engulfed in a massive revolt. His efforts there were noticed by Serdar-ı Ekrem Omar Pasha, so he was promoted to colonel and awarded the Order of the Medjidie, Third Class Order (Gold). His next appointment was Yemen, in 1868, where he was promoted to the rank of major-general with the title of Pasha, but also caught a disease which forced him to return to Constantinople in 1871.

After a few months of rest, he was placed in charge of the Third Army in Rumelia. In 1873 he became a lieutenant general and returned for a short while to Constantinople, before being sent to Scutari and later to Bosnia where he was appointed in charge of Trebinje. His appointment there didn't last long because he couldn't get along with the local governor, Ibrahim Dervish Pasha, so he was moved to the Fourth Army. In 1876, the Principality of Serbia proclaimed its independence and declared war on the Ottoman Empire. Osman Pasha, who had at that time his headquarters at Vidin, defeated the Serbian Army, but in April 1877 Russia declared war on the Ottomans. The Russian troops crossed the Danube into Bulgaria and Osman, with his army of 15,000 men and 174 cannons, was tasked with protecting the important fortress of Nikopol. Before he could get there, the city fell on 16 July after the Battle of Nikopol.

Osman knew that Russia's next objective would be to cross the Balkans, the last important natural obstacle before Constantinople itself, but they could not risk that if they had a strong enemy force behind them. So he moved his army 20 miles south of Nikopol, at Plevna, a small town surrounded by hills and ravines. The first Russian attack was easily repulsed on 20 July.

After that, Osman set about preparing for the next attack. He took advantage of the natural landscape and built a strong network of forts, trench lines, and redoubts that enabled him to fully use his superior armament (his troops had Krupp breech-loading artillery, long range Peabody-Martini rifles and Winchester repeaters, which severely outgunned and outranged the Russians). He also received 5,000 soldiers as reinforcements. On 30 July the Russians attacked again only to lose over 7,000 soldiers (almost a third of the attacking force). By now, with the Russian forces severely depleted and demoralized, Osman Pasha could have launched a counterattack that would have endangered the whole Russian army south of the Danube, but he chose to obey his orders and instead defended Plevna.

The Russians were quick to recover. Grand Duke Nicholas, commander of the Russian troops, sent an urgent telegram to Prince Carol I of the newly independent Principality of Romania asking for Romanian support. The Romanian Army sent 40,000 soldiers with 112 guns, modern Krupp pieces equal to those of the Ottomans, and Carol I was named commander of the joint Russian-Romanian troops around Plevna. By now, the Allied Army numbered 80,000 soldiers against an Ottoman force of around 40,000. Against Carol's wishes, the Allies launched another large-scale attack on Plevna on 11 September. After two days of fighting, even though the Allies had managed to dislodge the Ottomans from a few of the redoubts, almost all of them were recaptured, with the exception of Grivitza 1, taken by the Romanian soldiers.

The Allies could not withstand such severe casualties, so they settled in for a siege and fully surrounded Plevna. Osman Pasha asked for permission to withdraw before the encirclement was complete, but he was denied. By December, with food and ammunition running low and his troops suffering from starvation, cold and disease, Osman knew he could not hold on throughout the winter and that no help from outside was available. Instead of surrendering, he chose to try and break through the siege lines. On 9 December, the Ottoman army attacked a sector of the Russian line and nearly broke through. But the Russians recovered and closed the breach after bitter hand-to-hand fighting, driving the Ottomans back. But the enveloped army could not return to Plevna because during the engagement with the Russian forces, the Romanian army had stormed the defenses protecting their rear, making a withdrawal to the fortifications impossible. Furthermore, Osman was wounded in the leg by a bullet and his troops panicked, thinking that he had died. With his army caught between the Allies, Osman Pasha had no choice but to surrender to Mihail Cerchez.

In 1878, after the Treaty of Berlin was signed on 13 July, which recognized an autonomous Principality of Bulgaria and the independence of the Principality of Romania, the Principality of Serbia and the Principality of Montenegro from the Ottoman Empire, he returned from Russian captivity and received a hero's welcome in Constantinople. He was awarded the title of Gazi ("warrior" or "veteran" or "victorious") for gallantry and promoted to the rank of Field Marshal. In addition to his Adjutancy title, Osman received the Order of the Medjidiye, First Class Order (Gold), and the Imtiyaz Medal in Gold for his services to the Empire. He was made Marshal of the Palace by the Sultan and the Ottoman military anthem, still used today by Turkey, called Plevna March, was composed for his achievements in Plevna. He would go on to serve as War Minister on four occasions.

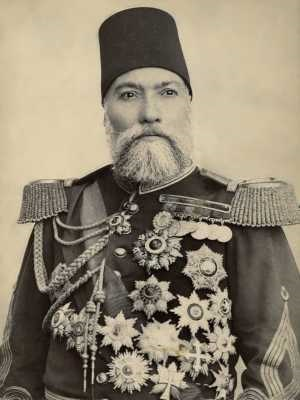
Photograph of Osman Nuri Pasha by the brothers Abdullah Frères, ca. 1895

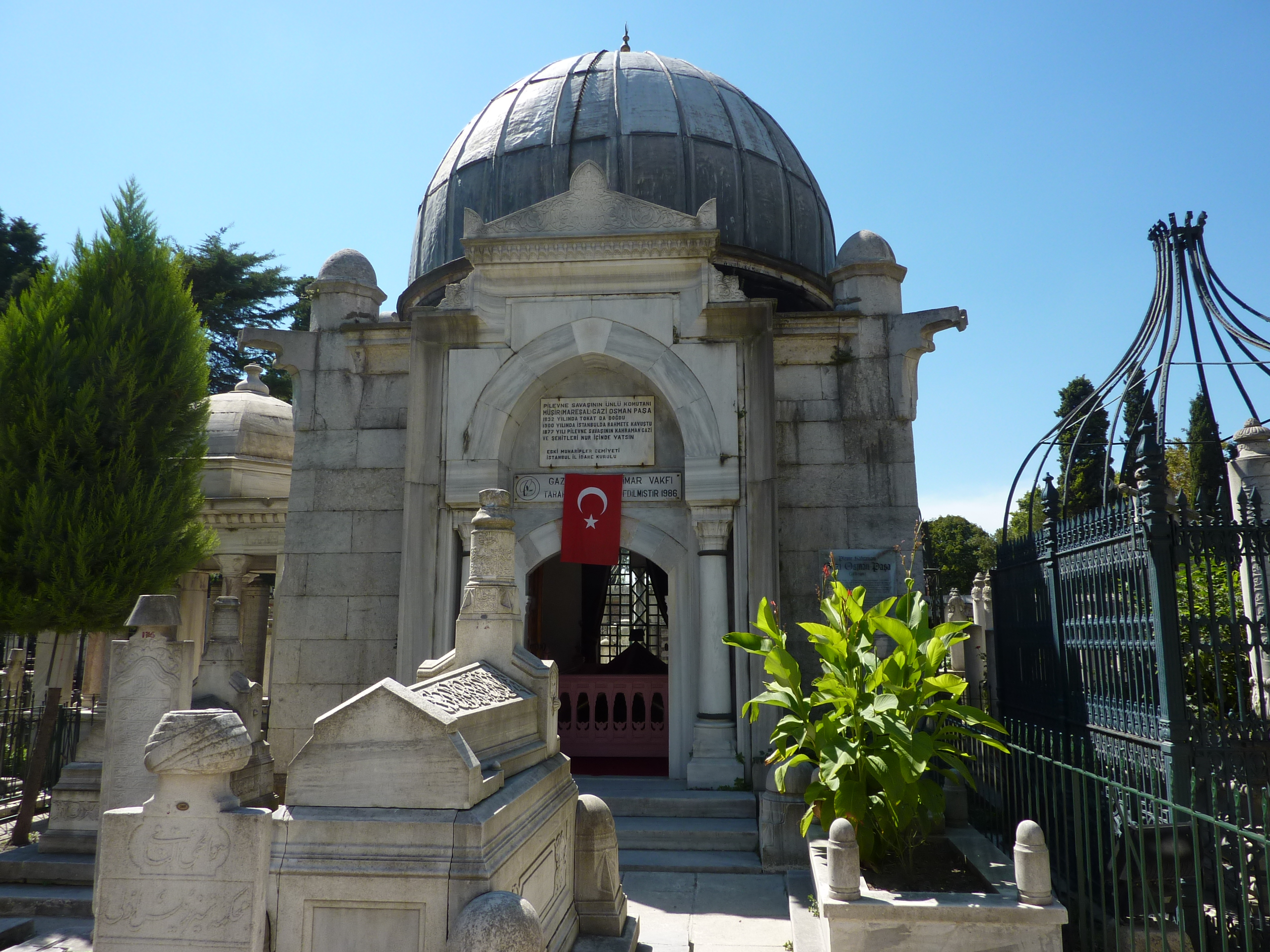
Tomb of Osman Pasha

On the night of 4 to 5 April 1900, he died in Constantinople. He was buried next to the Mosque of Fatih Sultan Mehmet as he had requested. His tomb was personally commissioned by Abdülhamit II, who regarded him as one of his greatest generals. He is still revered in Turkey today as a sort of tragic hero who displayed gallant perseverance in the face of hopeless odds, and his tomb is often draped with a Turkish flag.

== Siege of Pleven ==
During the Russian attack on Nikopol, Osman Pasha was in Vidin with his army. The Ottoman high command ordered Osman Pasha to reinforce Nikopol with 20,000 soldiers. While Osman was on his way to Nikopol, the city fell to the Russians on 16 July 1877. The Russians, knowing that Osman Pasha was heading to Nikopol, planned to intercept and attack his forces. Osman Pasha's troops were 20 miles away from Nikopol. Osman Pasha quickly created a strong network of fortifications, raising earthworks with redoubts, digging trenches and gun emplacements. On 19 July, Russian troops reached Pleven and started bombarding the town. The next day Russian troops continued the bombardment, eventually forcing some Ottoman units off the outer defences.

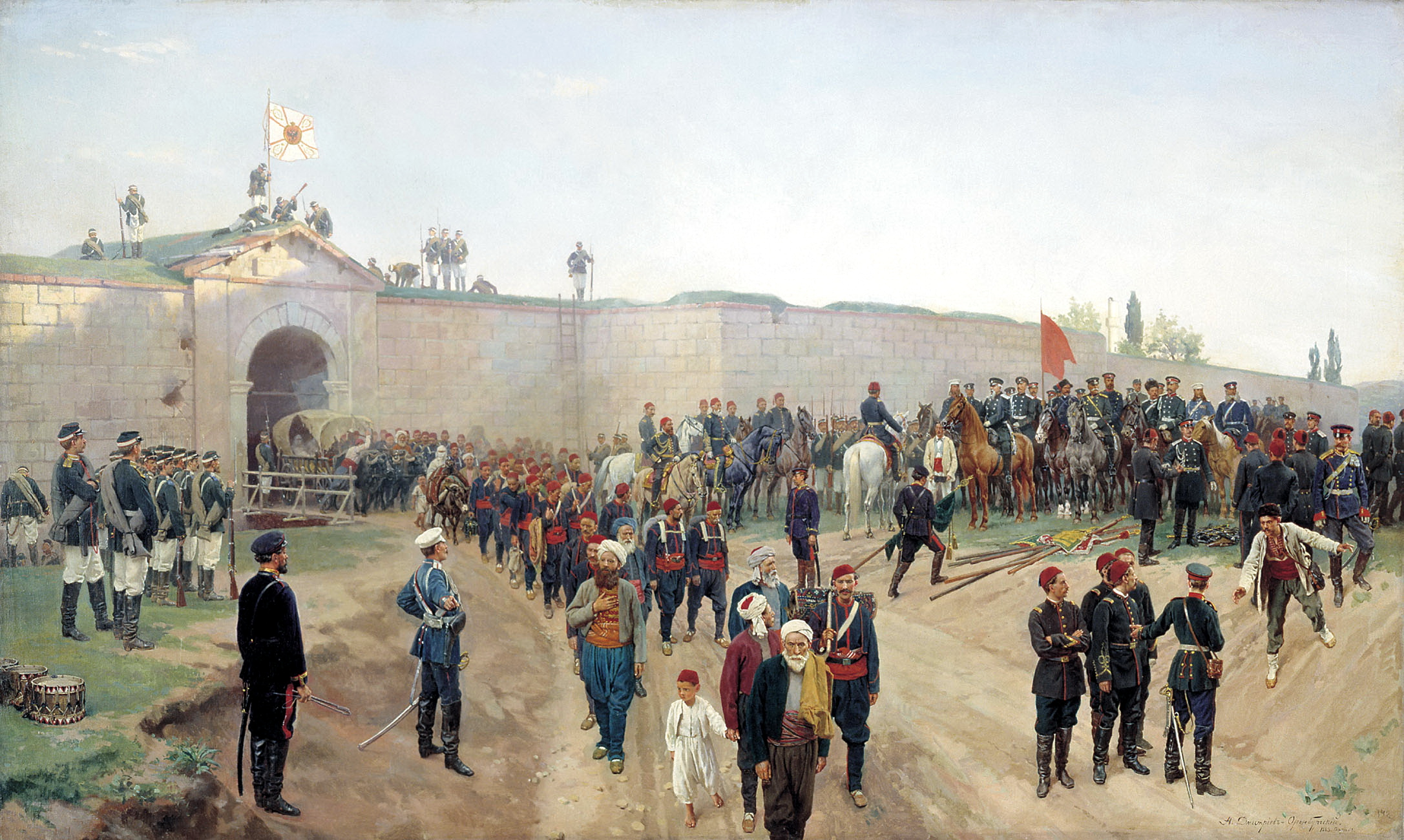
The Ottoman capitulation at Niğbolu (Nicopolis, modern Nikopol) in 1877 was significant, as it was the site of an important Ottoman victory in 1396 which marked the expansion of the Ottoman Empire into the Balkans.

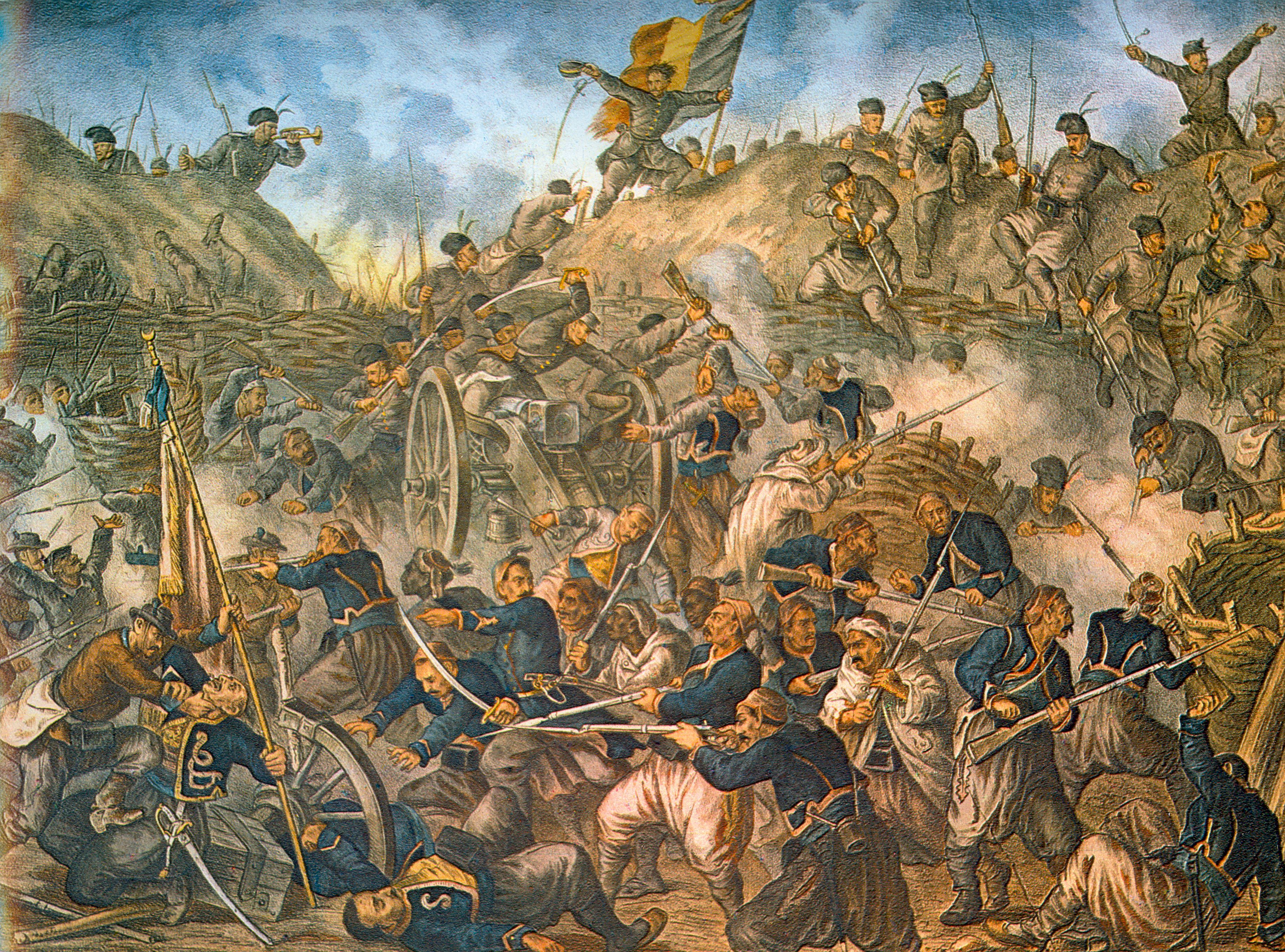
Siege of Plevna

Reinforcements began arriving to both sides, as fighting intensified, and the Russians launched an assault. During the first assault, the Russians suffered 4,000 casualties, while the Ottomans suffered 1,000. After this, Osman Pasha strengthened his defences. The Russians were reinforced by the army of Prince Carol I of Romania, who assumed command of the attacking army. On 31 July the Russians attacked Pleven again, but Ottoman troops managed to repulse the assault. After this second engagement, the Russians lost 10.000 men, while Ottomans lost 2,000. After suffering heavy casualties during the assault, the Russians sent out scouts, and resolved to cut off the Ottoman supply lines. To this end, Russian forces attacked the Ottoman garrison at Lovcha. This attack proved to be successful, and the Russians were able to cut off all communications and supply lines to Pleven. By now, Osman Pasha's army had been reinforced to 30,000, while the Russian forces numbered 100,000. On 11 September, the Russians resumed the artillery bombardment, and mounted another assault. The assault succeeded in taking a few redoubts but Osman Pasha retook most of them. After the third battle, the Russians lost roughly 20,000 men, while the Ottomans lost only 5,000. Since the beginning of the war, Russian and Romanian losses reached up to 50,000. As more Russian and Romanian troops joined the siege, all attacks were halted. General Eduard Ivanovich Todleben came to see the situation of the siege. He was experienced in siege warfare, and decided to encircle the city.

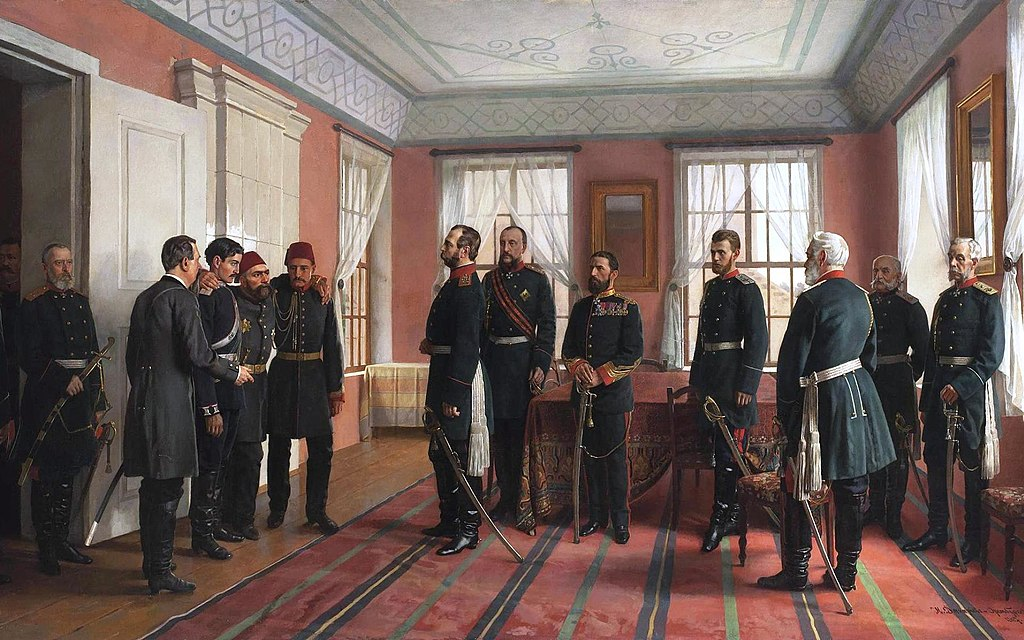
Osman Pasha and Alexander II of Russia

The Russian-Romanian army closed in by 24 October, as supplies began to run low in the city. On 9 December, Osman Pasha decided to attempt a retaliatory assault and attacked the Russian contingent during the night. Close-quarters combat ensued, but the Russian forces outnumbered the Ottomans. Osman Pasha's troops were driven back and he was struck in the leg by a stray bullet. Rumors of Osman Pasha's death spread panic, and Ottoman troops were driven back and enveloped by Romanian forces. At the end of the breakout attempt, the Ottomans had lost 4,000, while the Russians lost 2,000. The next day, Osman Pasha capitulated, surrendering the city to the Romanian Colonel Mihail Cerchez.

== Marriage and issue ==
Osman Nuri Pasha married Zatıgül Hanım, a lady formerly in harem of Sultan Abdulaziz.

Their first born son Damat Ali Nureddin Pasha was engaged in 1887, had the marriage arranged in 1889, signed the marriage contract in the Yıldız Palace on 15 March 1889 and married there on 20 April 1889 Zekiye Sultan, daughter of Sultan Abdul Hamid II and Bedrifelek Kadın, and had female issue:

- Ulviye Şükriye Hanımsultan (1890 - February 1893). Born and died in the Ortaköy Palace, buried in Yahya Efendi cemetery.
- Fatma Aliye Hanımsultan (1891 - 14 April 1972). Born in the Ortaköy Palace. In 1911 she married Mehmed Muhsin Bey Yeğen, from the powerful Yeğen Egyptian family. They had two sons:
  - Osman Hayder Bey Yeğen (5 September 1912 – ?), unmarried and without issue
  - Salih Zeki Bey Yeğen (4 September 1921 – ?), married and had a daughter and a son:
    - Fatma Yasemin Yeğen (b. 18 September 1973)
    - Muhsin Osman Yeğen (b. 14 December 1977)

Their younger son Damat Mehmed Kemaleddin Bey then Pasha, a minister, had the marriage arranged in 1898 and married in the Ortaköy Palace on 17 March 1898 Naime Sultan, daughter of Sultan Abdul Hamid II and Bidar Kadın, and had issue:

- Sultanzade Mehmed Cahid Osman Bey (January 1899 - 30 March 1977), married firstly at the Yıldız Palace on 26 March 1920, performed by Şeyhülislam Haydarîzâde İbrahim Efendi, Dürriye Sultan, daughter of Şehzade Mehmed Ziyaeddin and Ünsiyar Hanım, whose dowry was 1001 purses of gold and in whose prenuptial agreement she was given the right to divorce her husband, and divorced on 6 November 1921 with Şeyhülislam Nuri Efendi's assistance, without issue, and married secondly Laverans Hanım, Dürriye Sultan's maternal aunt, with whom he had one son:
  - Bülent Osman Bey, married and had two sons:
    - Bülent Osman (b. 2 May 1930), married and has a son:
      - Rémy Chengiz Osman (b. 16 November 1963), married and has a son:
        - Sélim Osman (b. 14 December 1992)
    - Koubilay Osman (b. 1937), married and has three children:
      - Shehnaz Osman (b. 1970)
      - Inci Osman (b. 1972)
      - Orhan Osman (b. 1975)
- Adile Hanımsultan (12 November 1900 - February 1979), married firstly in the Üsküdar Palace on 4 May 1922 Şehzade Mahmud Şevket, later Mahmud Şevket Osmanoğlu (Suadiye Villa, Istanbul, 30 July 1903 – Bagnols-sur-Cèze, 31 January 1973), who was three years her junior, son of Şehzade Mehmed Seyfeddin and Nervaliter Hanım, the couple settled in Kuruçeşme Palace as their residence, at the exile of the imperial family in March 1924 they first settled in France and then in Egypt, where the two divorced on 28 March 1928, and had one daughter, and married secondly in 1930 Orhan El-Bekri and had one son and two daughters:
  - Hamide Nermin Nezahet Sultan (Üsküdar Palace, 27 January 1923 - Bagnols-sur-Cèze, 7 November 1998), unmarried and without issue
  - Ayten El-Bekri, married renowned Egyptian Professor Zekeriya Nasr
  - Kubilay El-Bekri, married Gönül Hanım
  - Şermin El-Bekri

Their third son Cemaleddin Bey was betrothed in 1901 to Naile Sultan, daughter of Abdul Hamid II and Dilpesend Kadın, but in 1904, following Kemaleddin Pasha's affair with her cousin Princess Hatice Sultan, the daughter of Sultan Murad V, the engagement was broken off.

== Works ==
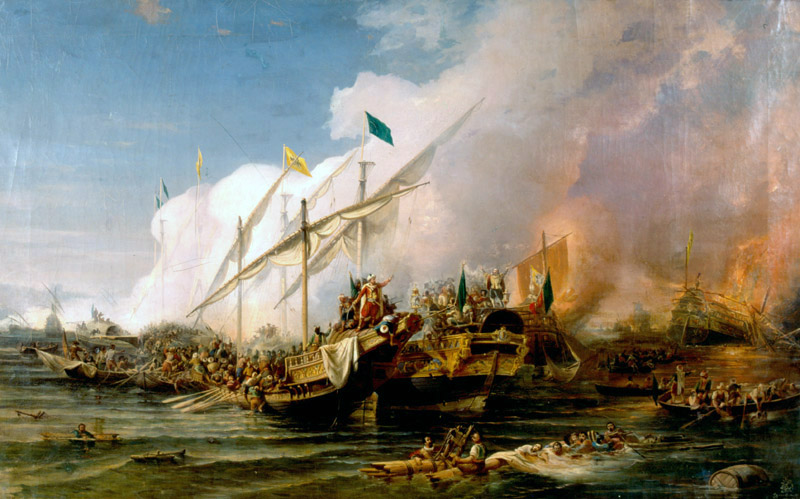
Barbarossa Hayreddin Pasha defeats the Holy League of Charles V under the command of Andrea Doria at the Battle of Preveza (1538)

Osman Pasha was a painter of military history. One of his most prolific works is the depiction of the Battle of Preveza (1538).

== In popular culture ==
Minnesota based heavy metal band Kostnatění covered the Plevne March, composed in memory of Gazi Osman Pasha, on their EP "Oheň hoří tam, kde padl" (Fire burns where it falls) released in 2022.

He was portrayed in Turkish TV series Payitaht: Abdülhamid by Aydın Sigalı.

== Bibliography ==
- Bağce, Betül Kübra (2008). II. Abdulhamid kızı Naime Sultan'in Hayati (Postgraguate Thesis) (in Turkish). Marmara University Institute of Social Sciences.
- Brookes, Douglas Scott (2010). The Concubine, the Princess, and the Teacher: Voices from the Ottoman Harem. University of Texas Press. ISBN 978-0-292-78335-5.
- Parry Melanie (ed.) (1997) "Osman Nuri Pasha" Chambers Biographical Dictionary (6th ed.) Larousse Kingfisher Chambers, New York, ISBN 0-550-16060-4;
- Dupuy, Trevor N.; Johnson, Curt; and Bongard, David L. (1992) "Osman Nuri Pasha" Harper Encyclopedia of Military Biography HarperCollins Publishers, New York, ISBN 0-06-270015-4;
- Von Herbert, Captain Frederick William (1911). The Defence of Plevna; Written by One who Took Part in It. London: John Murray – via Internet Archive.; reprinted 1990 by Ministry of Culture, Ankara, ISBN 975-17-0604-1;
- Hülagü, M. Metin (1993) Gazi Osman Paşa, 1833–1900: askeri ve siyasi hayatı Boğaziçi Yayınları, Istanbul, ISBN 975-451-094-6;
- Murray, Nicholas. “Nuri Osman Pasha,” Conflict and Conquest in the Islamic World: An Encyclopedia, edited by Alexander Mikaberidze. Santa Barbara, CA: ABC-CLIO, 2011.
- Murray, Nicholas. The Rocky Road to the Great War: The Evolution of Trench Warfare to 1914. Potomac Books Inc. (an imprint of the University of Nebraska Press), 2013.
- Yenice, İhsan and Fidan, Raşit (2001) Plevne kahramanı Gazi Osman Paşa, 1833–1900 Gaziosmanpaşa Belediyesi Kültür Yayınları, İstanbul, ISBN none;
- Sakaoğlu, Necdet (2008). Bu mülkün kadın sultanları: Vâlide sultanlar, hâtunlar, hasekiler, kadınefendiler, sultanefendiler. Oğlak Yayıncılık. ISBN 978-9-753-29623-6.
- Uçar, Nail (1978) Gazi Osman Paşa ve Plevne Orkun Yayınevi, Istanbul, ISBN none;
- Uluçay, Mustafa Çağatay (2011). Padişahların kadınları ve kızları. Ankara: Ötüken. ISBN 978-9-754-37840-5.
- Uru, Cevriye (2010). Sultan II. Abdülhamid'in kızı Zekiye Sultan'in Hayatı (1872-1950) (Master Thesis) (in Turkish). Marmara University Institute of Social Sciences. Archived from the original on 17 January 2022.
