= Adile Hanımsultan =

Ottoman princess (1900–1979)

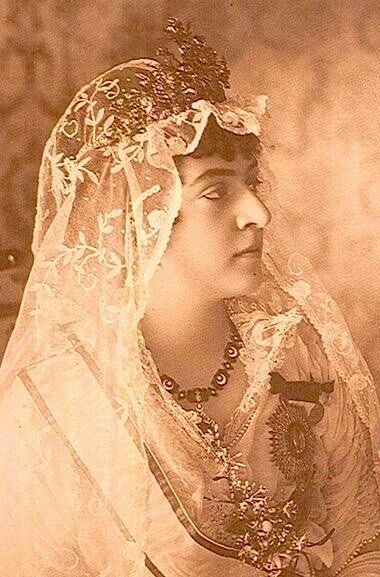
- Wedding photograph, Sébah & Joaillier, 1917
- Born: 12 November 1900; Ortaköy Palace, Istanbul, Ottoman Empire
- Died: February 1979 (aged 78); Cairo, Egypt
- Spouse: Şehzade Mahmud Şevket (m. 1922; div. 1928) Orhan El-Bekri (m. 1930)
- Issue: First marriage; Nermin Sultan; Second marriage; Ayten El-Bekri; Kubilay El-Bekri; Şermin El-Bekri
Names
- Turkish: Adile Hanımsultan; Ottoman Turkish: عدیله خانم سلطان
- House: Ottoman
- Father: Mehmed Kemaleddin Pasha
- Mother: Naime Sultan
- Religion: Sunni Islam

Adile Hanımsultan (Ottoman Turkish: عدیله خانم سلطان; 12 November 1900 – February 1979) was an Ottoman princess, daughter of Naime Sultan and Kemaleddin Pasha and granddaughter of Sultan Abdülhamid II.

== Early life ==
Adile Hanımsultan was born on 12 November 1900 in the Ortaköy Palace. Her father was Mehmed Kemaleddin Pasha, son of Gazi Osman Pasha and Zatıgül Hanım. Her mother was Naime Sultan, daughter of Sultan Abdul Hamid II and Bidar Kadın. She had an older brother, Sultanzade Mehmed Cahid Osman Bey. She was educated at the Ortaköy Palace.

In 1904, when she was four years old, her parents divorced, due to her father's affair with Hatice Sultan, daughter of Murad V. Her father was stripped of all military honours and ranks and exiled to Bursa. He came back to Istanbul in 1909 and died in 1920. Her mother afterwards married İşkodralı Celaleddin Pasha in 1907.

== Marriages and descendants ==
Adile's first husband was Şehzade Mahmud Şevket, son of Şehzade Mehmed Seyfeddin and Nervaliter Hanım, and three years her junior. The marriage took place on 4 May 1922 in the Üsküdar Palace, when Adile was twenty two and Mahmud was nineteen years old. The couple was given Kuruçeşme Palace as their residence. On 27 January 1923, she gave birth to the couple's only child, a daughter, Hamide Nermin Nezahet Sultan. Nermin developed bone tuberculosis, which afflicted her throughout her life.

After the exile of the imperial family in March 1924, Adile and her husband first settled in France and then in Egypt. Their daughter Nermin was taken by her grandmother, Naime, who claimed that Adile and Mahmud were too young to look after her. Nermin then grew up with her in Albania. Her parents divorced on 28 March 1928 in Cairo.

In 1930, Adile married Orhan El-Bekri, a wealthy man of Turkish origin. The couple had three children, two daughters and a son, Ayten El-Bekri, Kubilay El-Bekri and Şermin El-Bekri. Her son Kubilay married Gönül Hanım, a woman of Turkish origin. Her daughter Ayten married renowned Egyptian Professor Zekeriya Nasr. Şermin and Ayten both settled in Paris, France.

== Death ==
In 1952 the law for princesses was passed, which allowed them to return to Turkey; however Adile did not return and chose to remain in Cairo. She died in February 1979 at the age of seventy-eight in Cairo.

== Ancestry ==
Ancestors of Adile Hanımsultan

4. Osman Nuri Pasha
2. Mehmed Kemaleddin Pasha
5. Zatıgül Hanım
1. Adile Hanımsultan
12. Abdulmejid I
6. Abdul Hamid II
13. Tirimüjgan Kadın
3. Naime Sultan
14. Prince Ibrahim Bey Talustan
7. Bidar Kadın
15. Princess Şahika İffet Lortkipanidze

== Sources ==
- Bağce, Betül Kübra (2008). II. Abdulhamid kızı Naime Sultan'in Hayati (Postgraguate Thesis) (in Turkish). Marmara University Institute of Social Sciences.
- Sakaoğlu, Necdet (2008). Bu mülkün kadın sultanları: Vâlide sultanlar, hâtunlar, hasekiler, kadınefendiler, sultanefendiler. Oğlak Yayıncılık. ISBN 978-9-753-29623-6.
- Uluçay, Mustafa Çağatay (2011). Padişahların kadınları ve kızları. Ankara: Ötüken. ISBN 978-9-754-37840-5.
