= Nermin Sultan =

Ottoman princess, daughter of Şehzade Mahmud Şevket and Adile Hanımsultan

- Born: 27 January 1923; Üsküdar Palace, Istanbul, Turkey
- Died: 7 November 1998 (aged 75); Bagnols-sur-Cèze, France
- Burial: Bagnols-sur-Cèze, France
Names
- Turkish: Hamide Nermin Nezahet Sultan; Ottoman Turkish: حمیده نرمین نزاھت سلطان
- Father: Şehzade Mahmud Şevket
- Mother: Adile Hanımsultan
- Religion: Sunni Islam

Hamide Nermin Nezahet Sultan (Ottoman Turkish: حمیدہ نرمین نزاھت سلطان; 27 January 1923 – 7 November 1998) was an Ottoman princess, the daughter of Şehzade Mahmud Şevket, son of Şehzade Mehmed Seyfeddin and Nervaliter Hanım and Adile Hanımsultan, daughter of Mehmed Kemaleddin Pasha and Naime Sultan.

== Biography ==
Hamide Nermin Nezahat Sultan was born on 27 January 1923 in the Üsküdar Palace. Her father was Şehzade Mahmud Şevket, son of Şehzade Mehmed Seyfeddin and Nervaliter Hanım. Her mother was Adile Hanımsultan, daughter of Mehmed Kemaleddin Pasha and Naime Sultan. She developed bone tuberculosis at a young age, and was afflicted with that throughout her life.

After the exile of the imperial family in March 1924, Nermin settled in Nice, France with her grandmother Naime Sultan, because she argued that the couple were too young and inexperienced to care for their daughter. Her parents settled in Egypt, where they divorced in 1928.

Nermin and her grandmother lived in Cimiez. Henri Matisse, one of the most prominent French painters, lived in her neighbouring house, and one day he met Nermin, whom he found really beautiful. Matisse requested Nermin to become a model for his painting, therefore in 1942 the painting Odalisque Au Fauteuil Noir was published after Nermin's consent. The painting later rose to prominence, and in 2015 it was put up for auction for €15 million at Sotheby's in London.

During the outbreak of World War II, Nermin and her grandmother settled in Tirana, Albania. She was engaged in Albania, however her fiancé was executed by Albanian communist leader Enver Hoxha. Nermin and her grandmother were then held in Nazi concentration camp, where Naime died. After her grandmother's death, a British intelligence officer in Egypt, historian Lord Patrick Kinross, later brought her to Cairo by a military transport aircraft. She begin to live with her father in the Zamalek district. Farouk of Egypt gave them a salary from Ottoman foundations. However following the Egyptian Revolution of 1952, she again had to leave Egypt, after which she settled in Algeria. Nermin got a job in United Nations and provided social counselling to the refugees. She was active during Algerian War of Independence.

Following the independence of Algeria from France, Nermin moved to Bagnols-sur-Cèze to live with her father Mahmud. After her father's death in 1973, she started to receive his pension. Nermin became penniless after her father's death, and remained bedridden until her death.

Nermin died on 7 November 1998 at a local hospital's ward at the age of seventy five and was buried there.

== Ancestry ==
Ancestors of Nermin Sultan

8. Abdulaziz
4. Şehzade Mehmed Seyfeddin
9. Gevheri Kadın
2. Şehzade Mahmud Şevket
5. Nervaliter Hanım
1. Hamide Nermin Nezahat Sultan
12. Osman Nuri Pasha
6. Mehmed Kemaleddin Pasha
13. Zatıgül Hanım
3. Adile Hanımsultan
14. Abdul Hamid II
7. Naime Sultan
15. Bidar Kadın

== Sources ==
- Bağce, Betül Kübra (2008). II. Abdulhamid kızı Naime Sultan'in Hayati (Postgraguate Thesis) (in Turkish). Marmara University Institute of Social Sciences.
