= First Battle of Plevna =

1877 Russo-Turkish War battle

First Attack of Plevna
- Part of Russo-Turkish War (1877–1878) and Siege of Plevna
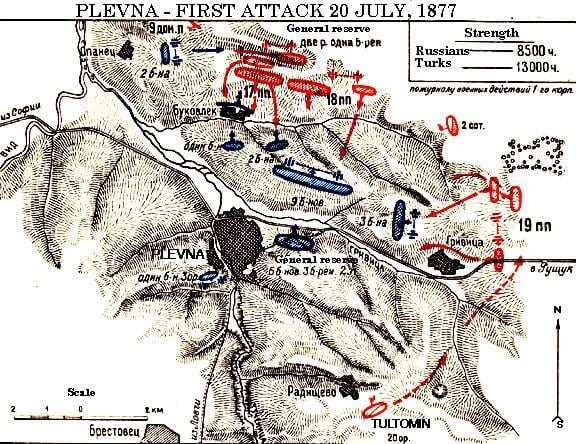
- First attack of Plevna, July 20, 1877, by the author L.G. Beskrovny
Date	July 19–20, 1877
Location	Plevna, Ottoman Empire (nowadays Pleven, Bulgaria)
Result	Ottoman victory (see Aftermath)

Belligerents
Ottoman Empire	Russian Empire

Commanders and leaders
(Ottoman Empire) Osman Pasha	(Russian Empire) Lt. Gen. Yuri Schilder-Schuldner (Russian Empire) Maj. Gen. Knorring † (Russian Empire) Rgt. Col. Rosenbaum †

Units involved
Unknown	5th division of the IX. corps

Strength
8,000 or 13,000	7,500 infantry

Casualties and losses
12–2,000 Turks killed 30 wounded (See Casualties...)	3,000+ deaths: 74 officers killed 2,771 men killed (See Casualties...)

The first battle of Plevna (or "defence of Plevna", a made-up title by the author Frederick William von Herbert) was the first assault that happened during the siege of Plevna in July 1877. On July 18th, 1877, 1,500 Russian cavalries were reconnoitering around the town of Plevna in the Ottoman Empire. They, the Russian cavalries, did clash when the Turkish skirmishes were small, and the Russians thought that the town itself was minorly defended. They report this to the lieutenant general Schilder-Schuldner. He sent his whole infantry, estimated to be 7,500, to occupy the town of Plevna, which took place on July 20th 1877.

== Background ==
On July 13th, 1877, Osman Pasha had left Vidin with the column which consisted of 19 battalions, 6 squadrons and 9 batteries, and also a total of 12,000 mens and 54 guns. Having heard that he was too was late to relieve on Nikopolo, he then instead to push into Plevna.

The Russians cavalry were going to reconnoitre around the town of Plevna. Those Russians cavalry had clashed into a small number of Turkish skirmishers, thinking that the town itself was lightly defended, and as well the cavalry reported this to the Russian Lieutenant general Schilder-Schuldner, commanding the 5th division of the IX. corps of his infantries, about 7,500 Russian infantry, to occupy the town of Plevna, which had already captured Nikopol, and decides later to occupy Plevna, as his guns were already set on action. Small numbers of Turks in the trenches were easily overcome, which allowed the Turks to flee. Osman Pasha had concealed his main forces, from in houses or at barns, or the others behind the sheltered locations. This allowed the Russians to enter a city unaware, while considerable numbers of the Ottoman main forces commanded by the Osman Pasha himself. The Turkish batteries had been led into action as soon as they arrived and returned on fire. A desultory artillery duel was carried on until nightfall, but there were no inclusive attacks that was made by the Russians on the 19th century.

Osman had distributed his own army into three sections: firstly at Janik Bair ridge, facing north, where there was a total of 13 battalions and 4 batteries, besides with advanced posts of 2 battalions and 1 battery each. Thereafter, at Opanetz and Bukova, facing at east and northeast, there were a total 5 battalions and 10 guns that were post on the eastern end of the Janik Bair; to the hills south of the Bulgareni road, there was a total 4 battalions and 2 batteries that were allotted, and on the either side of the road, under cover in the rear of them, most of the cavalry was placed. The remaining troops had formed a general reserve, which was posted on the hill just at east of the town. The hills to the north and east of Plevna were perfectly bare. The Turks had covered the 115 miles from Widin in seven days, as they were "trying heat" and were exhausted from that, besides few trenches that vomited.

== Aftermath ==
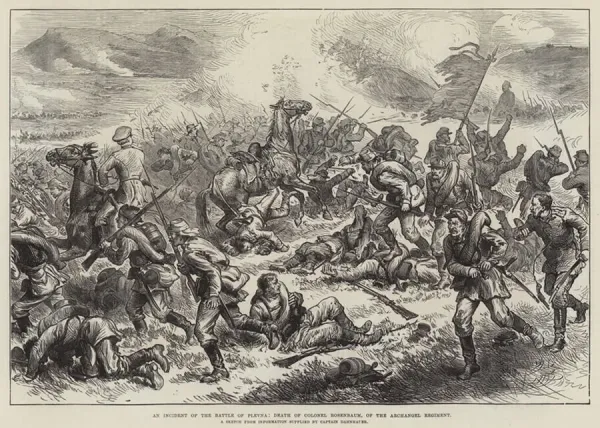
Incident took place that the Regiment Colonel Rosenbaum had died during the first assault of Plevna

The Turks forcibly offered the Russians to retreat, with a courageous resistance also. With a bugle signal, the Turks had revealed themselves and began to take out the Russians by pouring massive rifles to a startled Russians. Such small numbers only of those who made it into Plevna, besides man-aged to escaped the town. Their leader, Knorring, had likely fell into their own death in action, as well as the commander of "Archangel" Rosenbaum. At virtually point-blank range, the Winchesters had poured out the majority of the bullets, and the Peabody-Martinis kept up a lingering long-range fire upon the retreating Russians.

=== Casualties ===
==== Russians ====
Russians casualties were extended as high, more than the Turks casualties numbers. The estimation of an total of Russian casualties were expected about a total of 2,500+ or higher likely 3,000 casualties of the Russians (includes a total of 74 officers and 2,771 mens). (Note: those mens who fell (KIA) in a fire fight, which lasted only 15-20 minutes) Regardless to pointing an actual, reliable information of how much a total of Russians casualties is in aftermath of the first Battle in Plevna, which according to sources, as of the Turkish reinforcements had arrived, with vigorous counter-attacks that effectively pressed back the Russians, and as a result by noon, they, the Russians, were in full retreat, in conclude of battle having lost 2,800 men out of a total of 8,000.

==== Turkish ====
The total casualties of the Turks after the outcome may varies according to the various different websites. The Turks had loss about 12 of the Turkish troops, as well as the Turkish that were wounded about a total 30 of them. But, according to the "Xenophon Military History" website, a total large casualties of the Turks were higher than those minor numbers, as of the total is about 2,000 Turks were killed. Another accounts claim that it was 1,500 casualties. Severe losses were sustained by the two Regiments of Russian, which were Voglodana regiments and other one.

=== Plevne March ===
Plevna March (Turkish: Plevne Marşı or Osman Paşa Marşı) is an Ottoman military march associated with this battle. It commemorates Osman Pasha, commander of the Ottoman forces. The march celebrates the Ottoman garrison's resistance and Osman Pasha's role in the defense. It is among the best known pieces in the Turkish military-march repertory and is often performed by Mehter military bands.
