= Abdullah Frères =

Group of three Ottoman brothers, photographers of Armenian descent

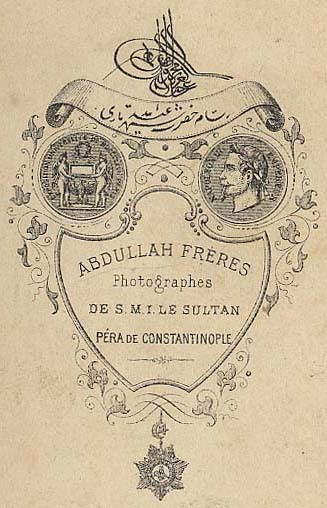
Trademark of the Abdullah Brothers. Note the tughra, indicating imperial patronage

The Abdullah Frères (French for "Abdullah Brothers"; Turkish: Abdullah Biraderler; Armenian: Աբդուլլահ եղբայրներ) were a group of three Ottoman brothers of Armenian descent, Vichen Abdullahyan (Note: Armenian: Վիգեն Աբդուլլահյանն) (1820–1902), Hovsep Abdullahyan (Note: Armenian: Հովսեփ Աբդուլլահյանն) (1830–1908), and Kevork Abdullahyan (Note: Armenian: Գևորգ Աբդուլլահյանն) (1839–1918), photographers of international fame during the late Ottoman Empire. They took pictures of scenic views and notable individuals, including sultans. Most of their photography was taken in the Ottoman Empire.

Vichen began his photographic career touching up photos for Rabach, who opened his photography studio in 1856 in the Bayezid district of Constantinople. In 1858, when Vichen's younger brother Kevork returned from his studies at the Moorat-Raphael College in Venice, they and another brother, Hovsep, decided to take over Rabach's photography studio and open their own, called the Abdullah Frères. In 1867, they sold their shop in Beyazid and moved to a more favorable location in Pera. The Abdullah Frères subsequently were among the most famous photographers in the Ottoman Empire. In 1863, Sultan Abdulaziz declared the Abdullah Frères the official court photographers and Outstanding Artists of the City, an epithet they used until the closure of the shop in 1899. In 1886, at the request of the Khedive in Egypt, they opened a branch in Cairo, Egypt.

Over their lengthy career, the Abdullah Frères photographed numerous Ottoman sultans, Ottoman statesmen such as Ibrahim Edhem Pasha and Osman Nuri Pasha, international figures such as Mark Twain, scenic views, and more.

Several collections of Abdullah Frères photographs exist around the globe. A significant body of work was recently discovered in the personal archive of Alexandra C. Vovolini. Part of her ancestor's archive, this collection includes rare material.

== Gallery ==
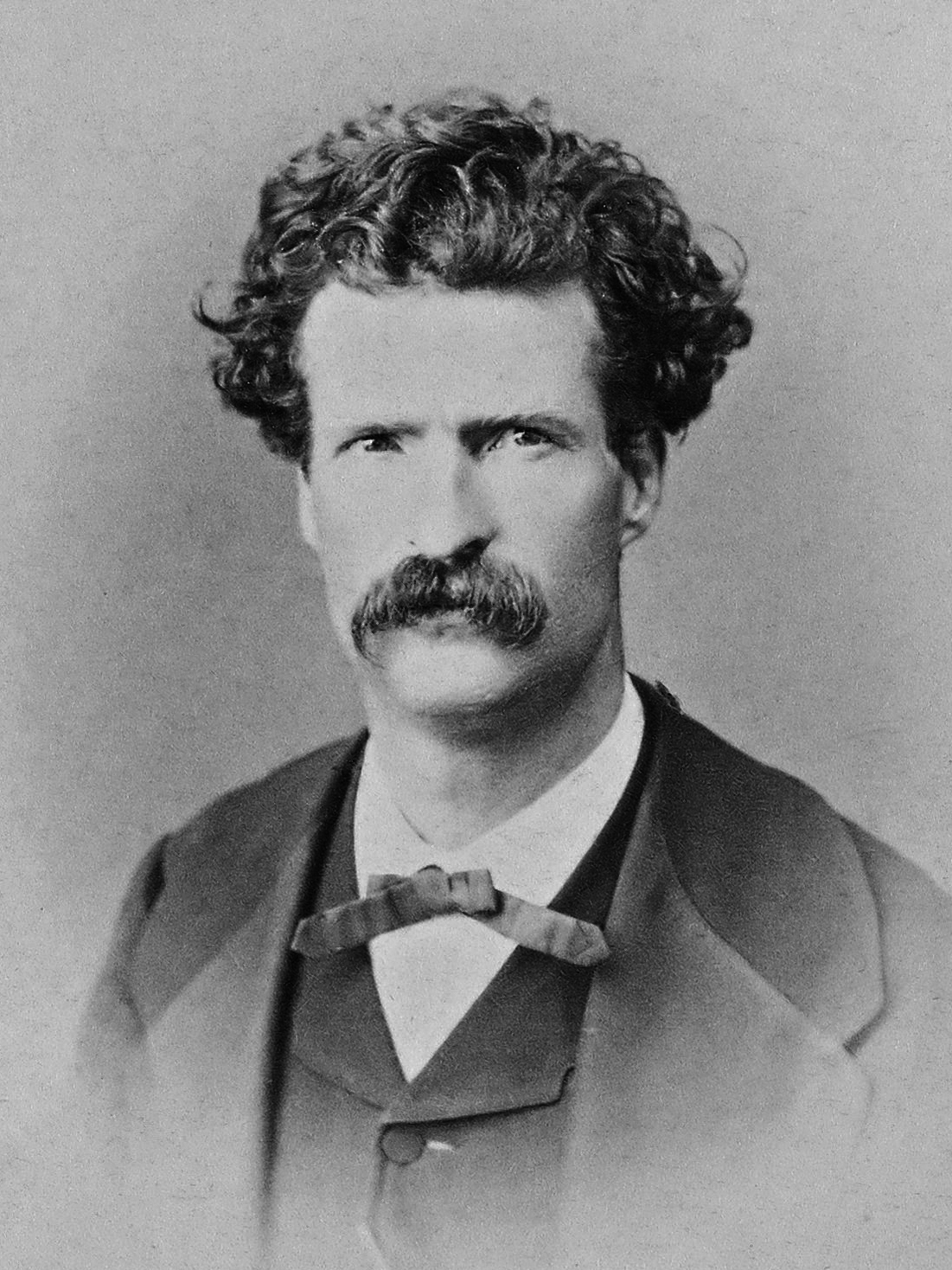
Mark Twain (1867)

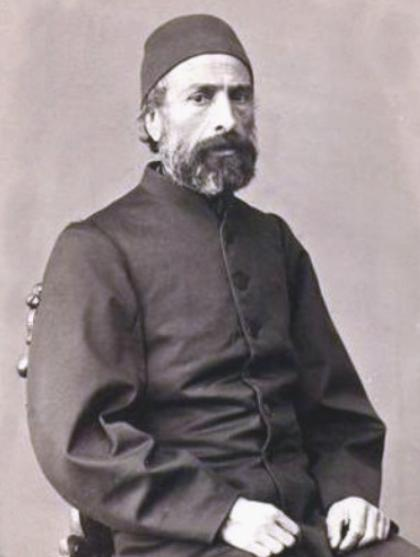
Ibrahim Edhem Pasha (c. 1877)

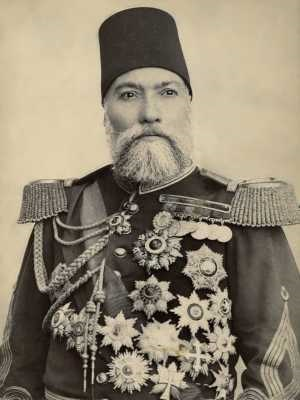
Osman Nuri Pasha (c. 1895)

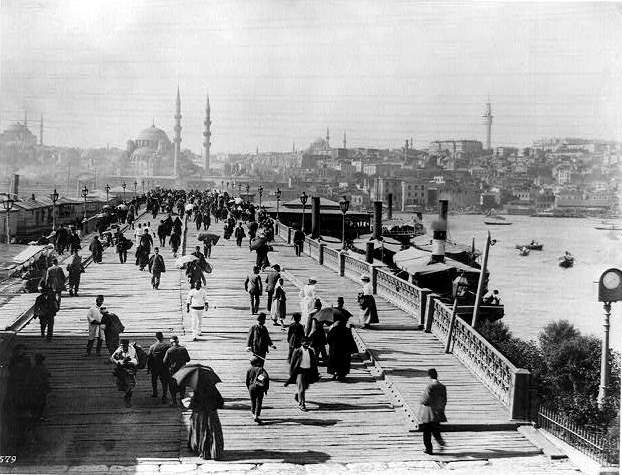
View of Galata Bridge

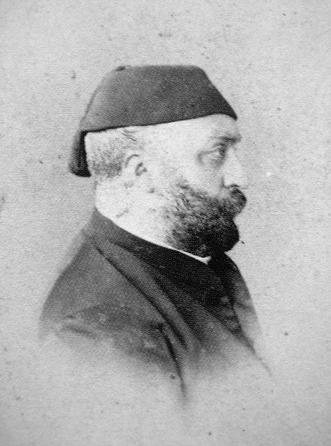
Sultan Abdulaziz

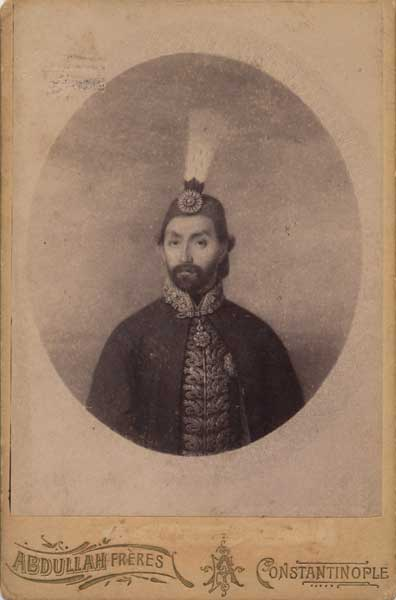
Sultan Abdulmecid (photo of a painting)

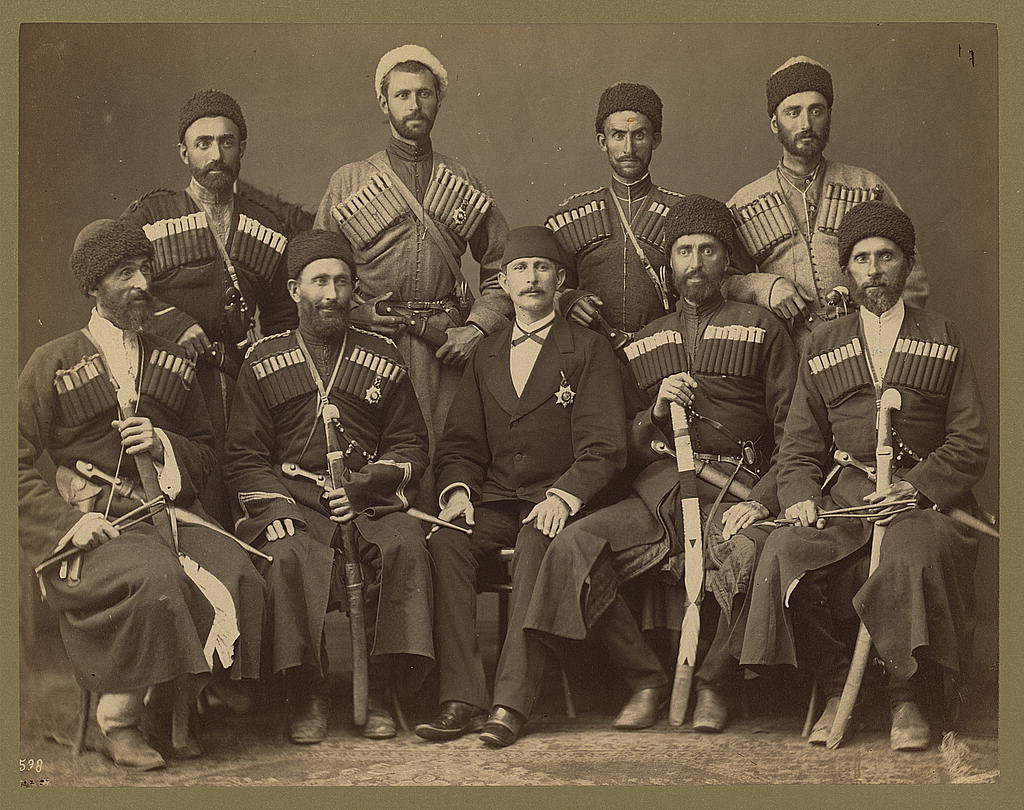
Group of Circassian men with an Ottoman official

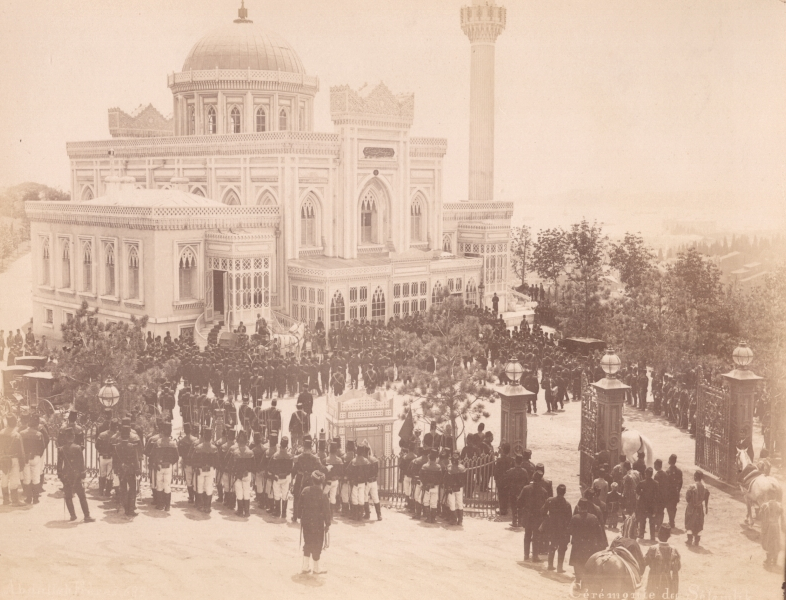
A ceremony in Yıldız Hamidiye Mosque, Constantinople

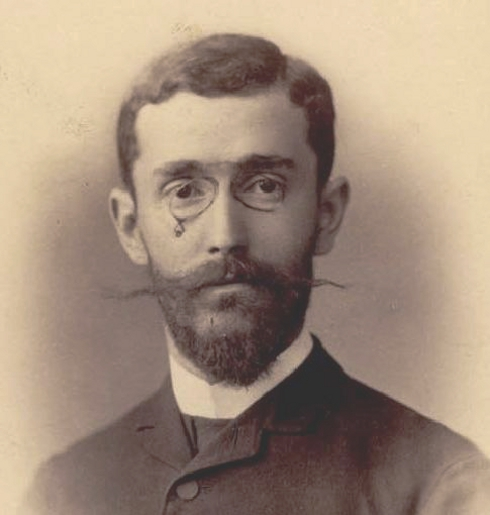
Portrait of the Romanian diplomat and memoirist Trandafir Trandafir G. Djuvara

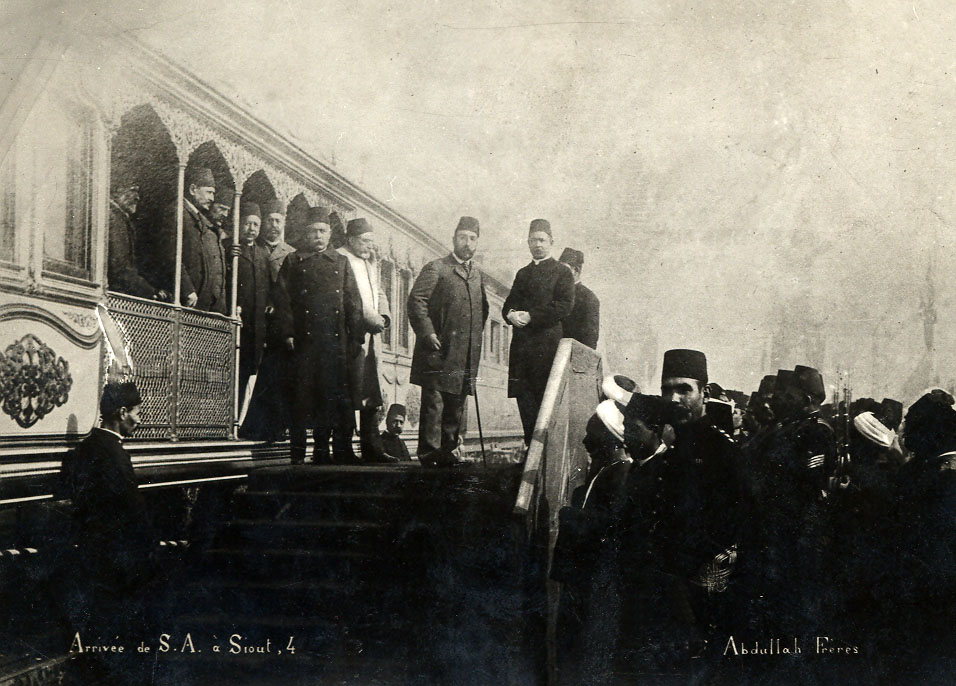
Photograph of Tawfiq Pasha

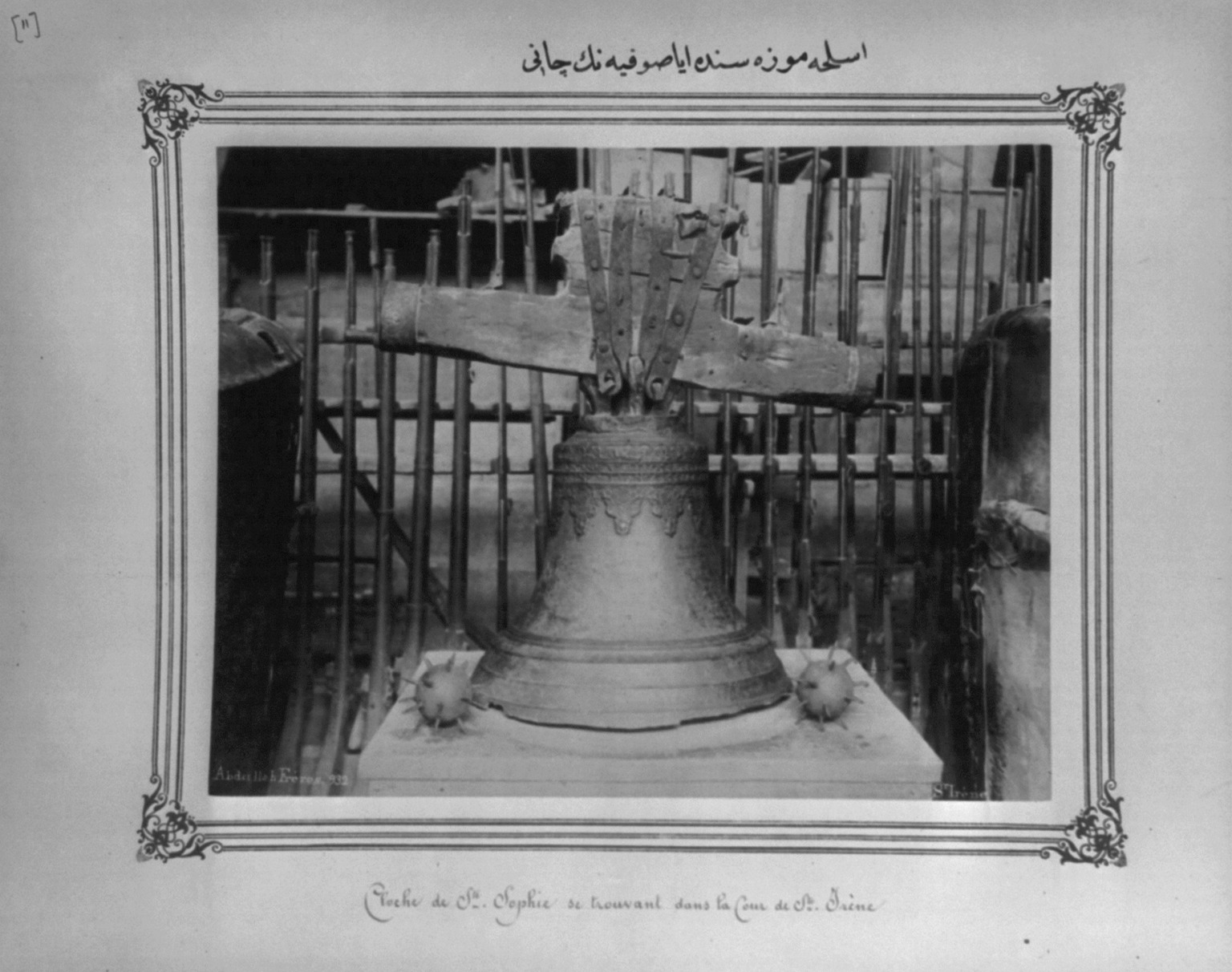
Bell of the Haghia Sophia

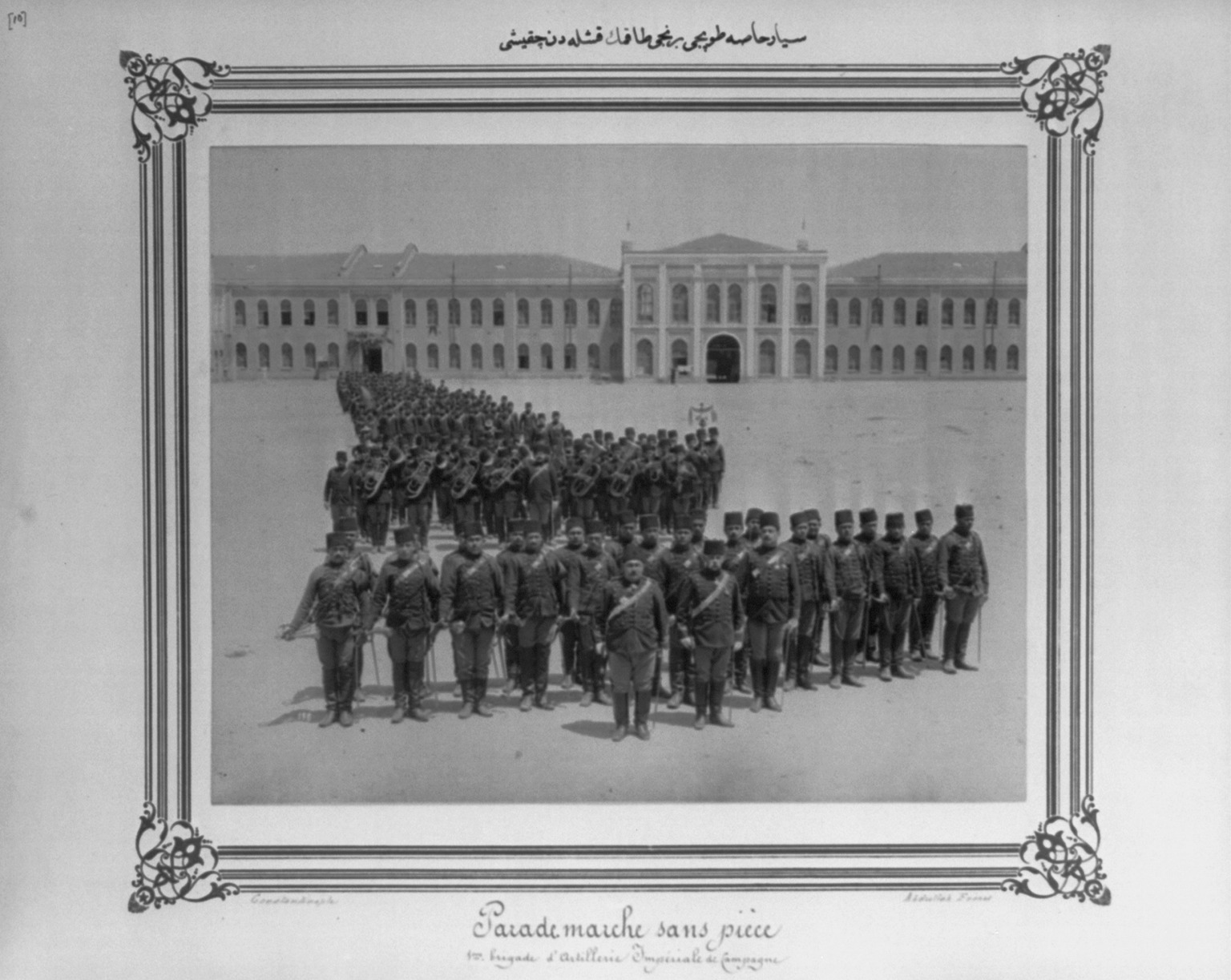
The sortie of the First Mobile Artillery Bodyguard Brigade from the barracks

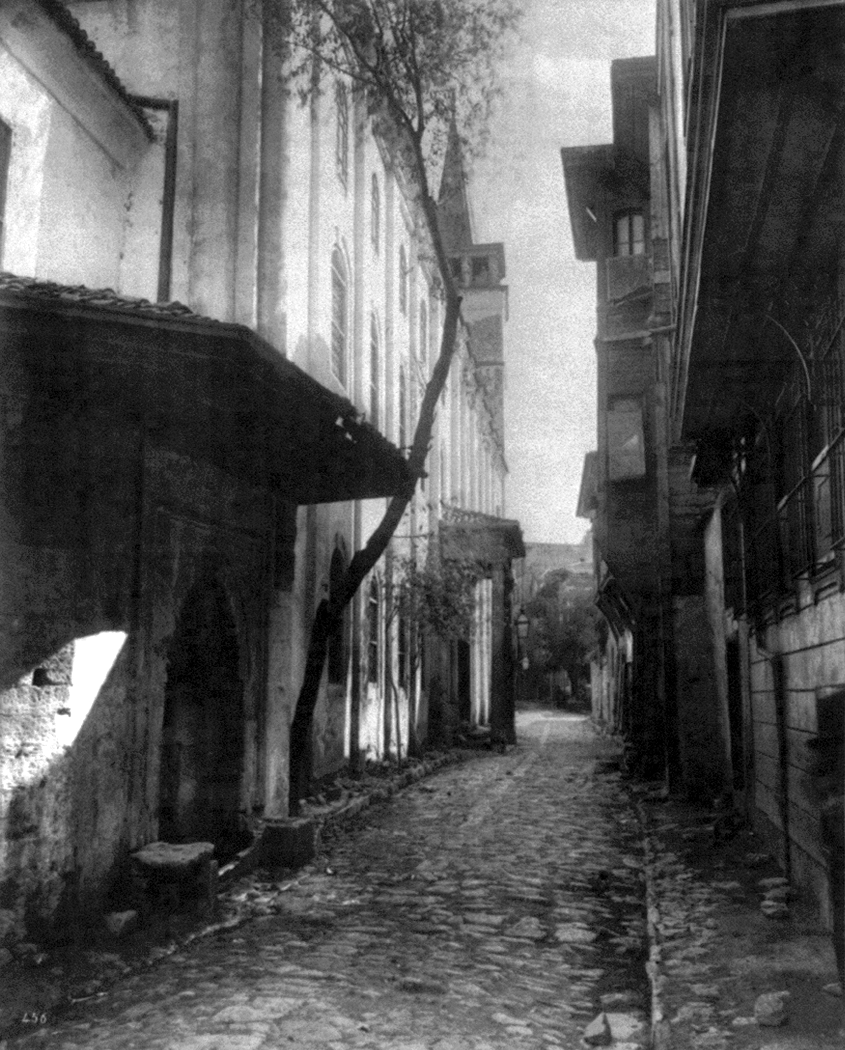
Street in Galata

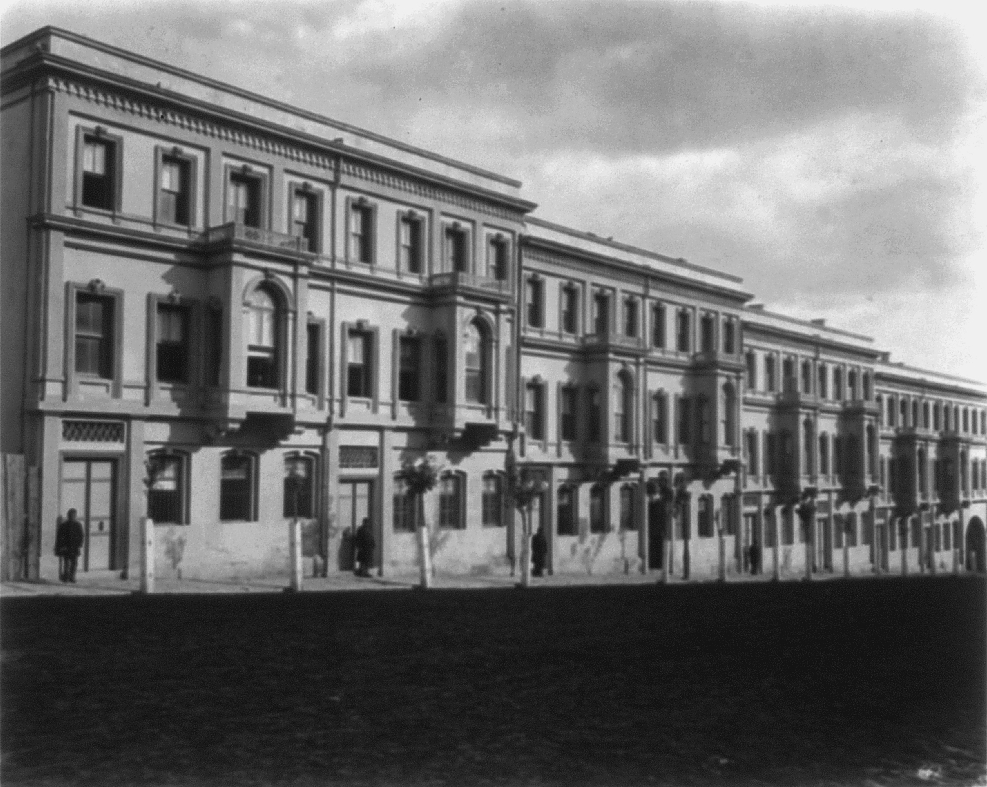
Mekteb-i Aşiret-i Humayun (Imperial Tribal School)

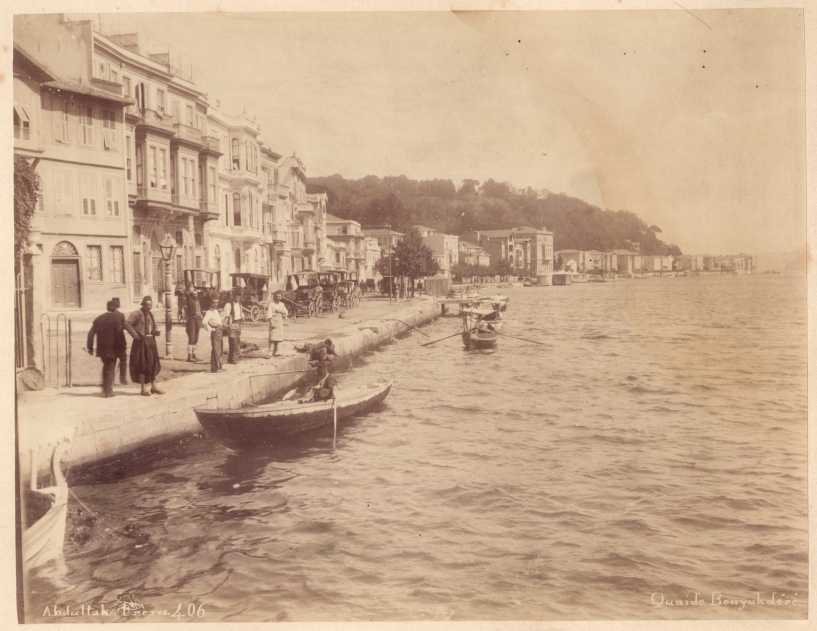
A dock in Büyükdere, Sarıyer, Istanbul

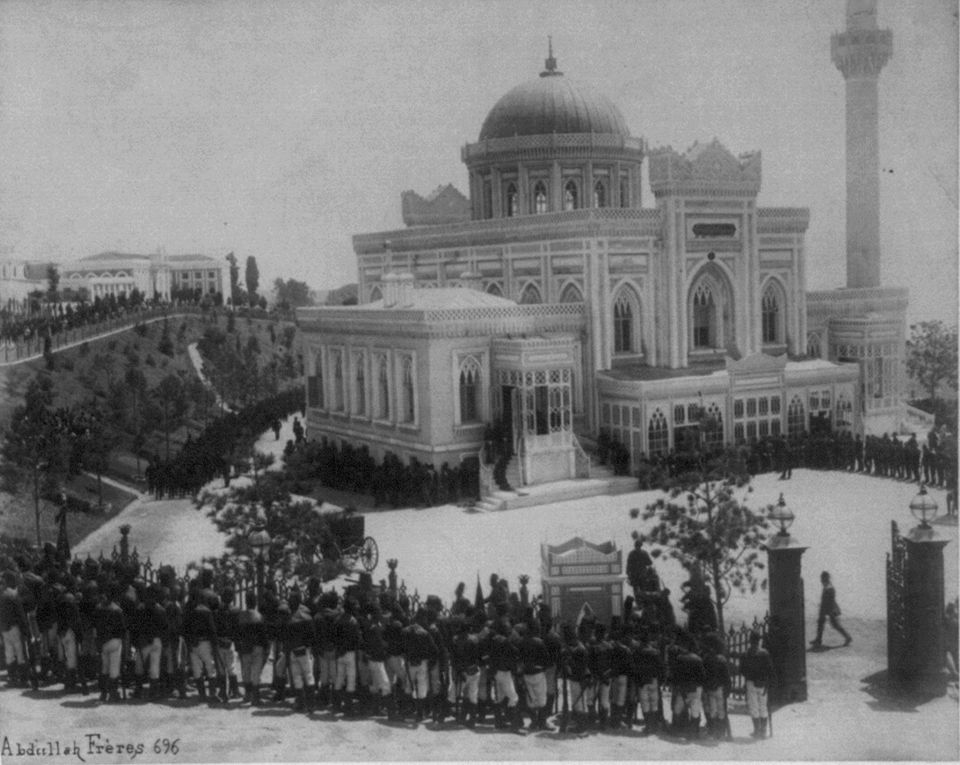
The Selamlik (Sultan's procession to the mosque) at the Hamidiye Camii (mosque) on Friday

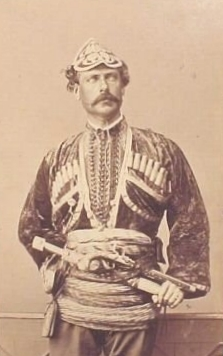
Georgian man (1870)

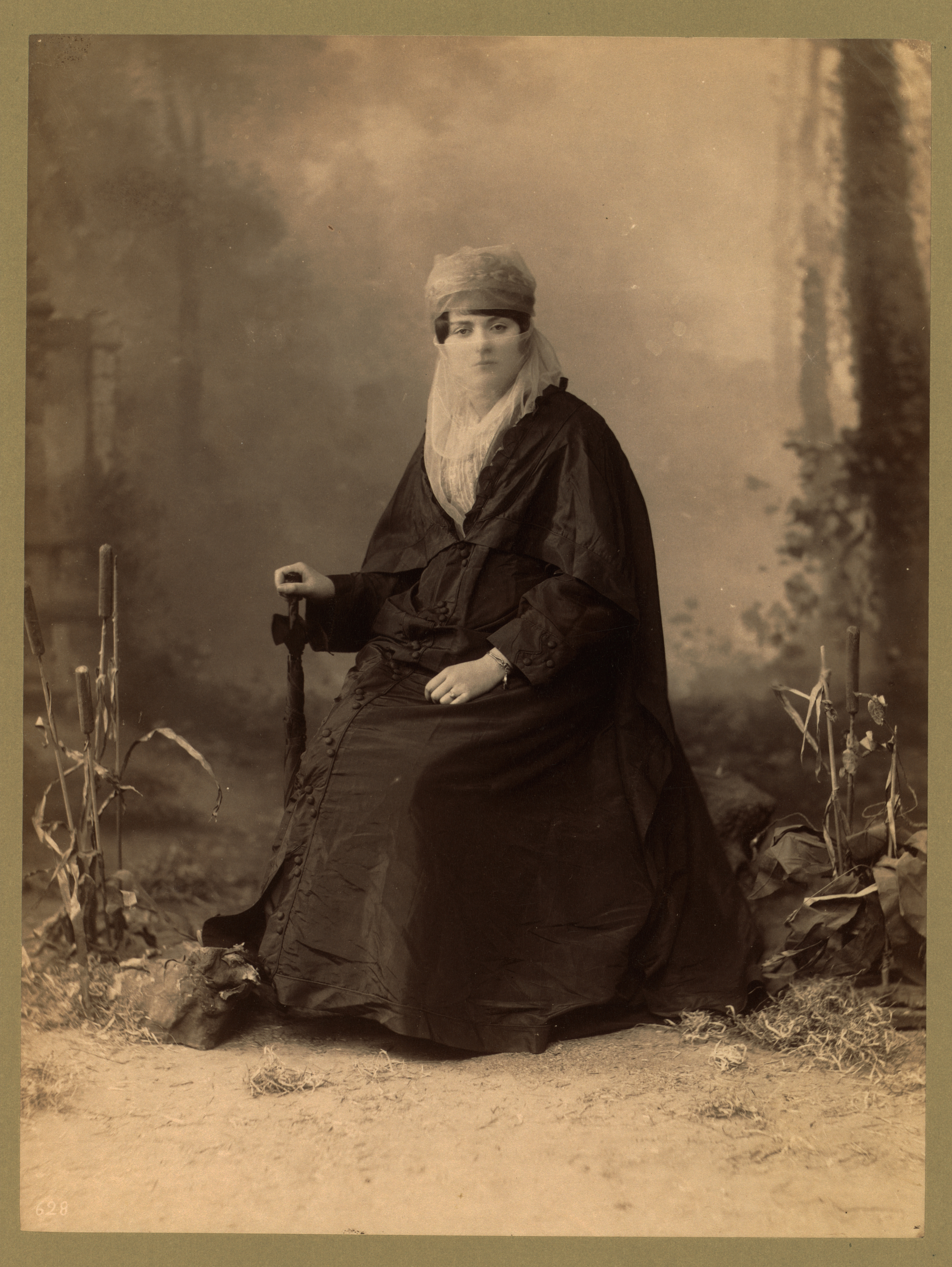
Turkish woman, full-length portrait, seated, facing front, holding parasol

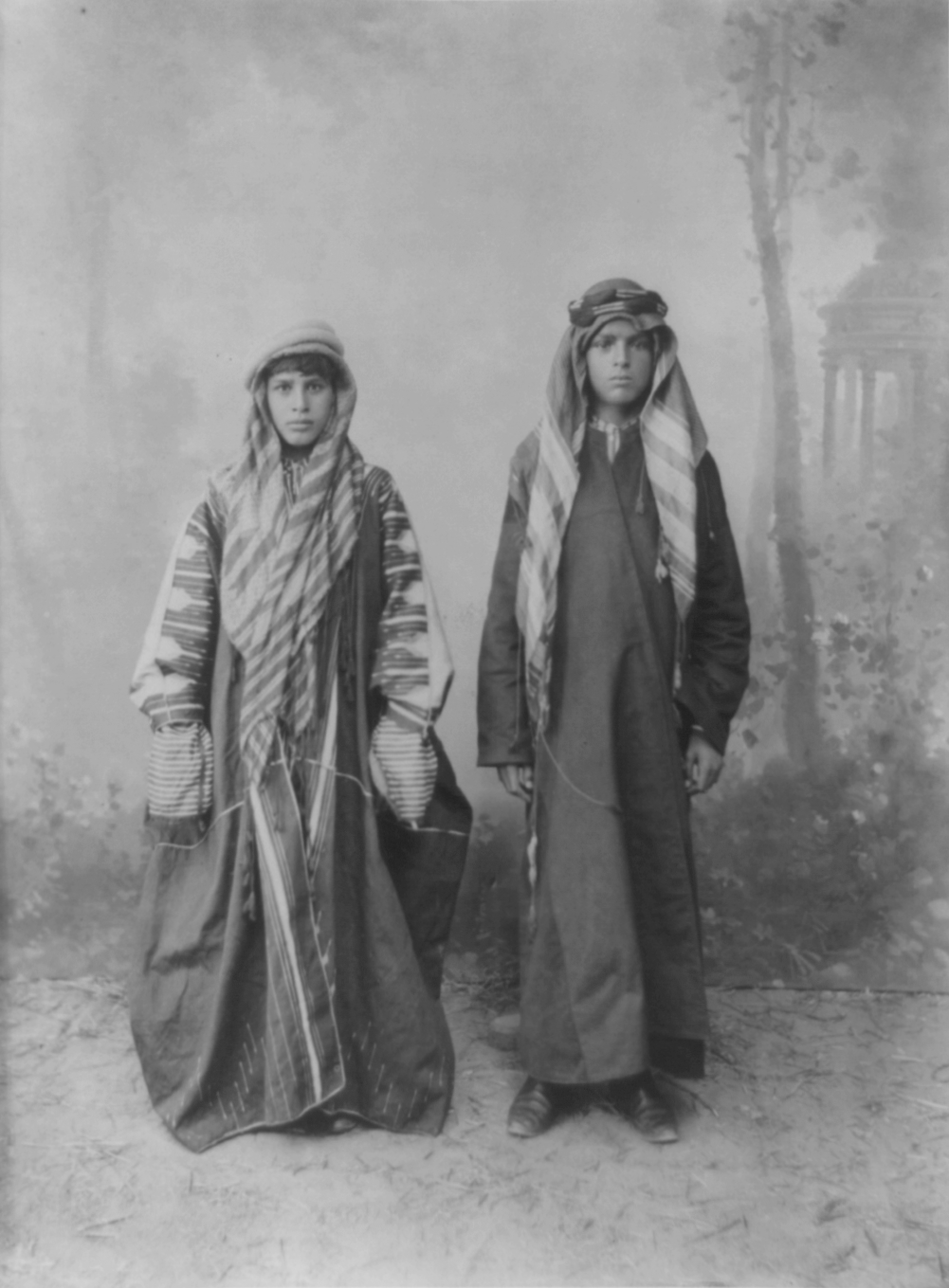
Students of Mekteb-i Aşiret-i Humayun (Imperial Tribal School)

Rumelihisarı İskelesi

The Port from the Galata Tower

Holiday Worship at the Sinan Pasha Mosque

Qerandiqo Berzeg, last leader of Circassia

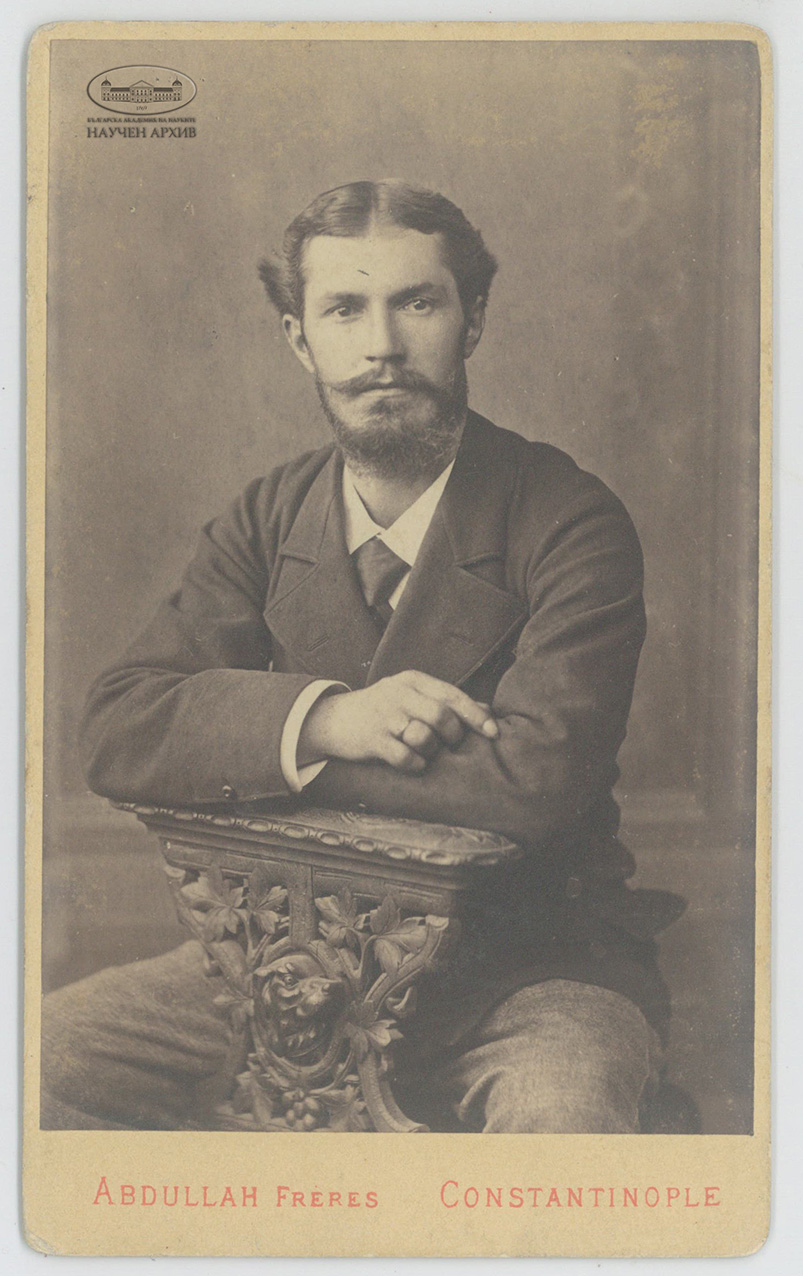
Petar Mateev, Bulgarian diplomat
