= Naime Sultan =

Ottoman princess, daughter of Abdul Hamid II (1876–c.1945)

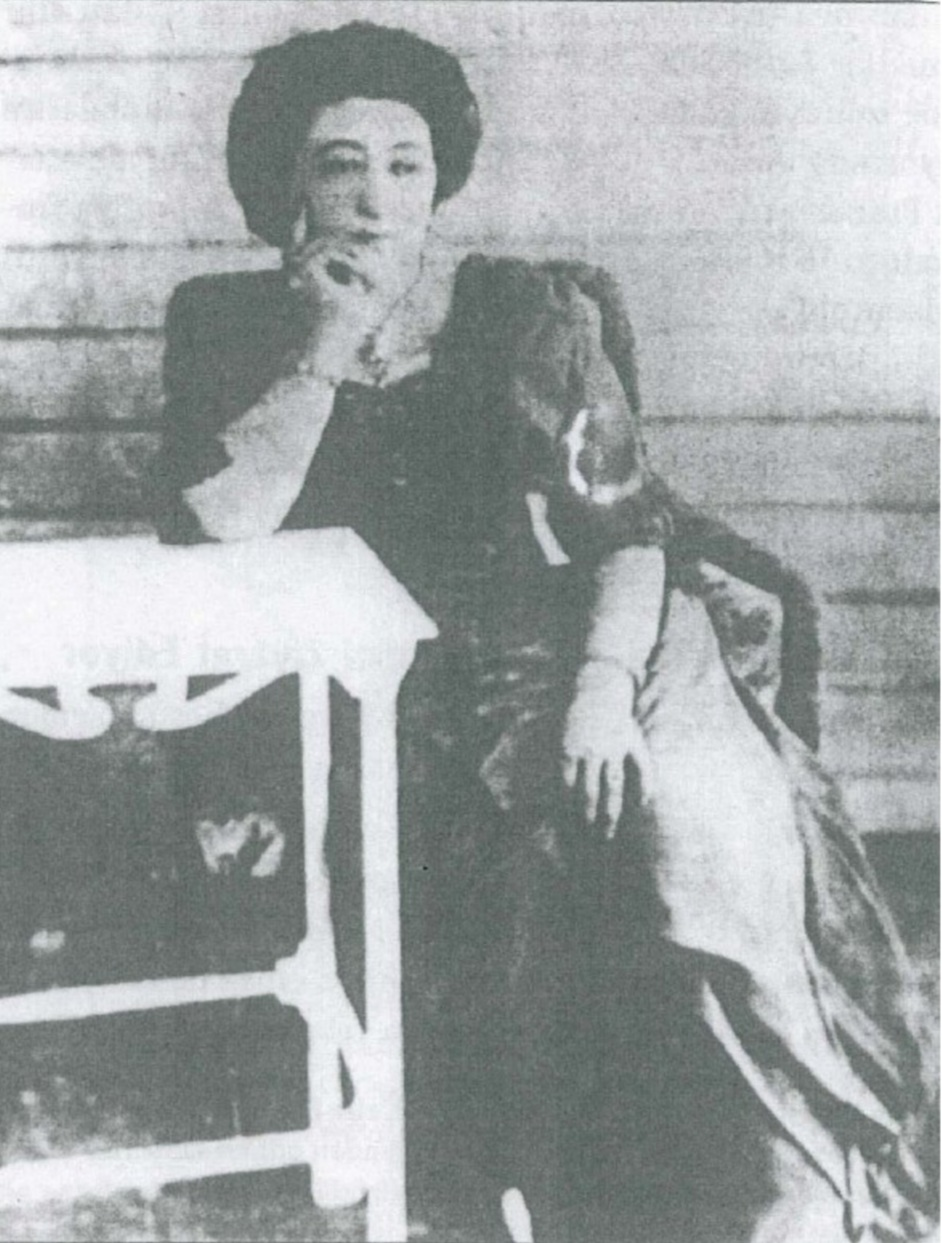
- Born: 5 September 1876; Dolmabahçe Palace, Istanbul, Ottoman Empire (now Istanbul, Turkey)
- Died: c. 1945 (aged 68–69); Tirana, Albania
- Burial: Tirana, Albania
- Spouse: Mehmed Kemaleddin Pasha (m. 1898; div. 1904) İşkodralı Celaleddin Pasha (m. 1907; died 1944)
- Issue: Sultanzade Mehmed Cahid Osman Bey; Adile Hanımsultan
Names
- Turkish: Fatma Naime Sultan; Ottoman Turkish: فاطمه نعیمه سلطان
- Dynasty: Ottoman
- Father: Abdul Hamid II
- Mother: Bidar Kadın
- Religion: Sunni Islam

Fatma Naime Sultan (Ottoman Turkish: فاطمه نعيمه سلطان; 5 September 1876 – c. 1945) was an Ottoman princess, the daughter of Sultan Abdul Hamid II and Bidar Kadın.

== Early life ==
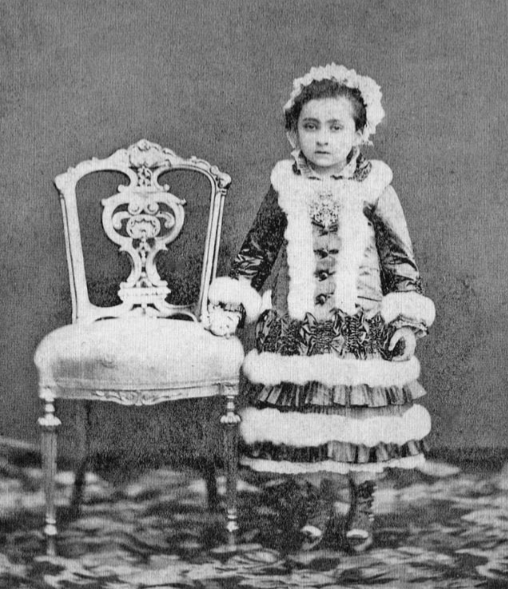
Naime Sultan in 1882, aged seven

Fatma Naime Sultan was born on 5 September 1876 in the Dolmabahçe Palace, four days after her father's accession to the throne. Her father was Abdul Hamid II, son of Abdulmejid I and Tirimüjgan Kadın. Her mother was Bidar Kadın. She was the fourth child, and third daughter of her father and the eldest child of her mother. She had one brother, Şehzade Mehmed Abdülkadir, two years younger than her.

Abdul Hamid called her "My accession daughter", because she was born four days after his accession to the throne. With her half-sisters Zekiye Sultan and Ayşe Sultan, she was one of Abdülhamid's favorite daughters. She was named after her late aunt, the only daughter of Tirimüjgan, and elder sister of her father. Naime Sultan had green eyes, as her paternal grandmother, Tirimüjgan Kadın. In 1877, Naime and other members of the imperial family settled in the Yıldız Palace, after Abdul Hamid moved there on 7 April 1877.

Naime took French and painting classes as a young child. She also liked playing the piano. She had learnt playing it from François Lombardi, along with her younger half-sister Ayşe Sultan. When the German empress Augusta Victoria of Schleswig-Holstein, visited Istanbul, Naime entertained her by playing German music on her piano.

Abbas Hilmi Pasha, the khedive of Egypt asked for Naime Sultan's hand in marriage. However, Abdul Hamid did not approve of this marriage over political reasons and offered instead a lady of court of his. Her father decided that she would marry Şehzade Mehmed Ziyaeddin, the son of Mehmed V, Abdul Hamid's brother. However it wasn't accepted by Mehmed Reşad, and as a result the marriage did not take place (curiously, Naime's son will later marry Ziyaeddin's daughter).

== First marriage ==
In 1898, Abdul Hamid arranged Naime's marriage to Mehmed Kemaleddin Bey, younger son of Gazi Osman Pasha and Zatıgül Hanım, a lady formerly in the harem of Sultan Abdulaziz, whose eldest son Ali Nureddin Pasha was husband of her elder sister, Princess Zekiye Sultan. A mansion was built for her in Ortaköy next to the household of princess Zekiye, so that the two buildings used to be called "The Twin Mansions".

The marriage took place on 17 March 1898 in the Ortaköy Palace. Gazi Osman Pasha sent Princess Naime a tiara, while Abdul Hamid presented her new mother-in-law with the Order of the Medjidie. No minister's wife had ever received this order. Kemaleddin Bey was later made a Pasha and also became Damat.

Naime Sultan's dress was white as she wanted to give a European wedding impression. Quite a few old-fashioned persons criticized the fact that her dress was white, because until that time all princesses had worn red at their weddings. But at Naime's wish and insistence, hers was white.

The marriage was described by Ayşe Sultan, one of Naime's half-sisters, in her memoirs:

When her husband entered the salon in the harem where his bride was seated, he ceremoniously asked her to rise but the princess refused (as was custom). The groom begged her and started to sweat, but Naime Sultan refused for at least half an hour. At that, the Valide Sultan was called and said to her: “My dear girl, for my sake please rise. Don’t hurt our son-in-law’s feelings.” Naime Sultan finally rose, and cries of Maşallah were heard while the Hamidiye March was played. Kemaleddin Paşa and the Constable of the Maidens escorted her with difficulty to the bridal room, because the stairway was crowded with guests and Naime Sultan’s dress was particularly heavy. She seated in the corner set up for her inside the bridal room, then the groom exited and tossed golden coins around. Then it was the Sultan’s golden coins turn, then the Valide Sultan’s, then the Senior Kalfas of the elder princesses began to scatter golden coins to the ground floor, each of them shouting the name of her mistress. Afterwards, the female members of the Imperial Family entered the room of the bride and kissed her hand to congratulate her. Then the banquet began and lasted until evening, when the guests began to leave. The groom kissed the hand of the Valide Sultan. At the time of the nighttime prayer, Kemaleddin Paşa was once again escorted by the Constable of the Maidens to the room of his wife. Before entering, he kissed the hands of the Valide Sultan and of the princesses one last time. Inside the room, he performed his prayers on a prayer rug embroidered with golden threads, while Naime Sultan stood watching him. Prayers done, the Constable of the Maidens closed the room door, performed a floor temenna (salutation) and prayed that the marriage would be blessed by God.

The two together had a son, Sultanzade Mehmed Cahid Bey, born in January 1899, and a daughter, Adile Hanımsultan, born on 12 November 1900. Mehmed Cahid married Dürriye Sultan, a daughter of Şehzade Mehmed Ziyaeddin. Adile married Şehzade Mahmud Şevket, a son of Şehzade Mehmed Seyfeddin, and grandson son of Abdulaziz and Gevheri Kadın

== Kemaleddin's affair and divorce ==
Hatice Sultan, daughter of Sultan Murad V, her neighbour in the adjoining villa, had been having an affair for three years, between 1901 and 1904, with her husband, Kemaleddin Pasha. According to Filizten Hanım, the two decided to have Naime murdered so they could get married. At the time of discovery, Naime Sultan was ill. The shock of discovering that the husband she loved was cheating on her with her cousin further weakened her and she did not recover for some time, and this reinforced the rumors that the two lovers had poisoned her. However, Naime's medicines, cosmetics, drinks and food were analyzed and no poison was found.

Many of the sources reveal the same idea about how this love between Kemaleddin Pasha and Hatice Sultan emerged. According to this idea, this love story consists of a trap set by Hatice Sultan. She wanted to take revenge from Sultan Abdul Hamid, who had imprisoned her father in Çırağan Palace for years, left her single until the age of thirty and caused her to marry someone she never loved. The perfect way to take revenge was to ruin the marriage of the Sultan favourite's daughter.

However, Semih Mümtaz, whose father, the Governor of Bursa, was charged with guarding Kemaleddin Pasha in his internal exile, mentions nothing whatsoever about a plot to poison Naime, but rather claims that the affair between Hatice Sultan and Kemaleddin Pasha consisted of the exchange of love letters tossed over the garden wall, heated love letters on the part of the impulsive Kemaleddin Pasha. He claims that Hatice Sultan had the Pasha's letters stolen and revealed to Sultan Abdul Hamid on purpose, in revenge for the poor husband the Sultan had chosen for her.

The resulting scandal angered Abdul Hamid. First he had Naime Sultan divorce her husband. Then he stripped Kemaleddin Pasha of all his military honors and exiled him to Bursa. Hatice's father, Murad, was a diabetic and when he heard of the affair, the shock of his distress brought on his death a short time later.

== Second marriage ==
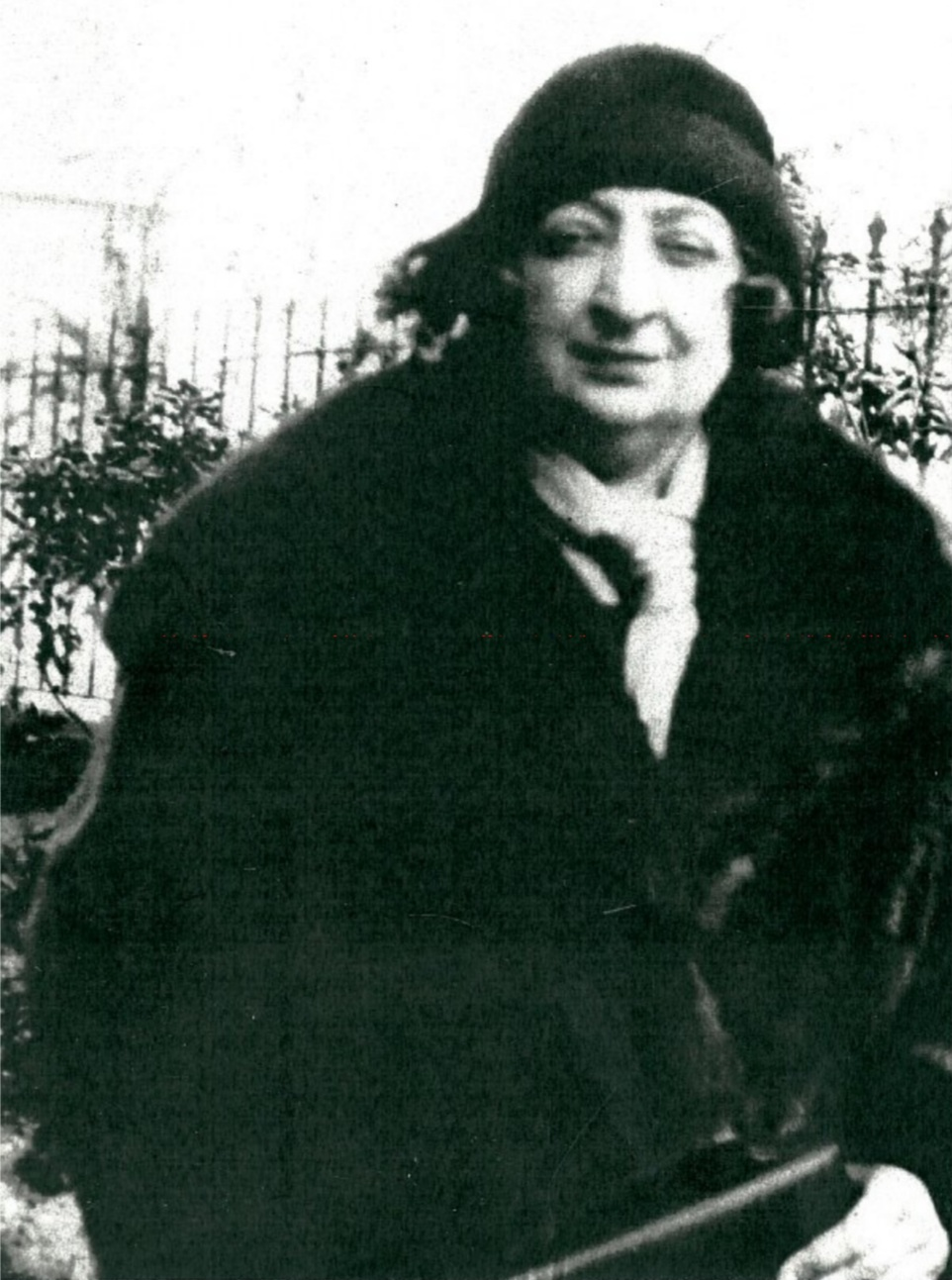
Naime Sultan in exile in 1931

Following her divorce from Kemaleddin Pasha in 1904, Naime married İşkodralı Celaleddin Pasha, son of İşkodralızâde Ali Riza Paşa and descendant by a daughter of Sultan Mahmud II, on 11 July 1907 at Yıldız Palace. He was promoted to vizir for the occasion. As it was Naime Sultan’s second marriage, celebrations weren’t held, only the official ceremony (nikkah). He was created Damat. Though the marriage was childless, it was said to have been peaceful and friendly.

Starting late in 1920, the then Ankara government organized two intelligence organizations based in Istanbul, the Müdafaa-i Milliye Grubu (Mim Mim group, National Defense Group), which brought together the remnants of the Karakol or Teşkilatı group which had been effectively suppressed by the second British occupation of the Ottoman capital, and the Felah group which was an entirely new and separate oranganization, established to keep and eye on the former Unionists as to smuggle arms, people, and to gather information. Naime and her cousin, Fehime Sultan, daughter of Sultan Murad V were active members of the organization.

== Exile and death ==
At the exile of the imperial family in March 1924, Naime along with her husband and granddaughter Nermin Sultan settled in Genoa, Italy, where her husband had rented a hotel. They later settled in Nice, France. In Nice, they settled in a small villa which had a garden, after selling her jewellery. Her son also settled in Nice with her. In exile, she taught Turkish and told stories about the lavish life of the palace to her grandson, Bülent Osman.

Her husband contracted tuberculosis. During the illness of her husband, Naime spent all the money she had to save him but his condition was serious, she worked as a dishwasher in hotels and sometimes collected discarded vegetables from markets, however his condition was serious and he died right before the Nazi invasion of France in 1940.

Following the Italian occupation of France in the same year, Naime Sultan left France, along with her granddaughter Nermin Sultan and settled in Tirana, Albania, which was then under the fascist rule of Italy. Following the death of her husband, she fell into poverty. In Tirana, she tried to support herself with her husband's lands in Shkodra, but it was confiscated by the communist regime of Enver Hoxha.

According to her grandson, she died due to bombing on her house in 1945, in the middle of World War II. Another source revealed that Naime died in a Nazi concentration camp in Albania. This proved to be true as Şehzade Mahmud Şevket had found his daughter Nermin, in a concentration camp as she lived with Naime.

According to Mislimelek Hanım, the wife of her brother Abdülkadir, who lived with Naime after she separated from Abdülkadir, explains in her memoirs that after the Italian troops attacked their home and took them to Nazi camps, where Naime died. After her death, Mislimelek had requested the soldiers that she be buried according to Islamic traditions, however they laughed, and protected Naime’s body. After they had called their commander, Mislimelek pleaded with him and he did accept her plea; she was given a bath and shroud and buried in Tirana, Albania.

== Character ==
According to her younger sister Ayşe Sultan, Naime Sultan resembled her grandmother Tirimüjgan Kadın. She was really delicate, sweet, and kind hearted. She arranged the marriages of orphaned Circassian girls in her entourage. Naime adored music, she had several musicians in her palace, who played the saz. She also had an interest in poetry and art. She was embodiment of great prestige and influence among people and for that she was called a princess of epitome of refined manners.

== Honours ==
Styles of Naime Sultan
- Reference style: Her Imperial Highness
- Spoken style: Your Imperial Highness

- Order of the House of Osman
- Order of the Medjidie, Jeweled
- Iftikhar Sanayi Medal in Gold

== Issue ==
Name	Birth	Death	Notes
By Damat Mehmed Kemaleddin Pasha
Sultanzade Mehmed Cahid Osman Bey	January 1899	30 March 1977	married Dürriye Sultan, daughter of Şehzade Mehmed Ziyaeddin and Ünsiyar Hanım. The marriage took place on 26 March 1920 at the Yıldız Palace, and was performed by Şeyhülislam Haydarîzâde İbrahim Efendi. Her dowry was 1001 purses of gold. In the prenuptial agreement she was given the right to divorce her husband. The two divorced on 6 November 1921 with Şeyhülislam Nuri Efendi's assistance. After their divorce, he married Dürriye's maternal aunt Laverans Hanım, with whom he had one son, Bülent Osman Bey. He had two sons: Bülent Osman (b. 2 May 1930), who has a son, Rémy Chengiz Osman (b. 16 November 1963) who, in turn, has a son, Sélim Osman (b. 14 December 1992); and Koubilay Osman (b. 1937), who has three children: Shehnaz Osman (b. 1970), Inci Osman (b. 1972) and Orhan Osman (b. 1975).
Adile Hanımsultan	12 November 1900	February 1979	married Şehzade Mahmud Şevket, who was three years her junior, son of Şehzade Mehmed Seyfeddin and Nervaliter Hanım. The marriage took place on 4 May 1922 in the Üsküdar Palace, and the couple settled in Kuruçeşme Palace as their residence. The two together had a daughter named Hamide Nermin Nezahet Sultan (Üsküdar Palace, 27 January 1923 - Bagnols-sur-Cèze, 7 November 1998). At the exile of the imperial family in March 1924, they first settled in France, then in Egypt, where the two divorced on 28 March 1928. She laterremarried and had a son and two daughters.

== In popular culture ==
- In the 2017 TV series Payitaht: Abdülhamid, Naime Sultan is portrayed by Turkish actress Duygu Gürcan.

== See also ==
- List of Ottoman princesses

== Sources ==
- Bağce, Betül Kübra (2008). II. Abdulhamid kızı Naime Sultan'in Hayati (Postgraguate Thesis) (in Turkish). Marmara University Institute of Social Sciences.
- Brookes, Douglas Scott (2010). The Concubine, the Princess, and the Teacher: Voices from the Ottoman Harem. University of Texas Press. ISBN 978-0-292-78335-5.
- Sakaoğlu, Necdet (2008). Bu mülkün kadın sultanları: Vâlide sultanlar, hâtunlar, hasekiler, kadınefendiler, sultanefendiler. Oğlak Yayıncılık. ISBN 978-9-753-29623-6.
- Uluçay, Mustafa Çağatay (2011). Padişahların kadınları ve kızları. Ankara: Ötüken. ISBN 978-9-754-37840-5.
