= Şehzade Mahmud Şevket =

Ottoman prince, son of Şehzade Mehmed Seyfeddin

- Born: 30 July 1903; Suadiye Villa, Constantinople, Ottoman Empire (now Istanbul, Turkey)
- Died: 31 January 1973 (aged 69); Bagnols-sur-Cèze, France
- Burial: Bagnols-sur-Cèze, France
- Spouse: Adile Hanımsultan (m. 1922; div. 1928)
- Issue: Hamide Nermin Nezahet Sultan
Names
- Turkish: Şehzade Mahmud Şevket; Ottoman Turkish: شهزاده محمود شوکت
- Dynasty: Ottoman
- Father: Şehzade Mehmed Seyfeddin
- Mother: Nervaliter Hanım
- Religion: Sunni Islam
- Military career
- Allegiance: Ottoman Empire
- Branch: Ottoman Navy
- Service years: 1918–1922 (active service)
- Rank: See list

Şehzade Mahmud Şevket Efendi (Ottoman Turkish: شهزادہ محمود شوکت; also Mahmud Şevket Osmanoğlu; 30 July 1903 – 31 January 1973) was an Ottoman prince, the son of Şehzade Mehmed Seyfeddin, and the grandson of Sultan Abdulaziz.

== Early life ==
Şehzade Mahmud Şevket was born on 30 July 1903 in his father's villa in Suadiye. His father was Şehzade Mehmed Seyfeddin, son of Sultan Abdulaziz and Gevheri Kadın, and his mother was Nervaliter Hanım. He had two full siblings, Şehzade Ahmed Tevhid and Gevheri Sultan, twins one year younger than him, and an older half-brother, Şehzade Mehmed Abdulaziz.

== Education and career ==
Şevket began his education in the princes school located in the Ihlamur Pavilion. On 5 June 1918, he was enrolled in the Imperial Naval School located on Heybeliada Island. On 9 July 1918, he was given the rank of junior officer in the Ottoman navy. A few months later, his education naval school ended and he was sent back to Ihlamur Pavilion for military training. Following the Armistice of Mudros in October 1918, his education in the Ihlamur Pavilion also ended. He eventually graduated from the naval school in July 1922. On 30 July, he was appointed as honorary aide-de-camp to Sultan Mehmed VI.

== Personal life ==
Şevket's only wife was Adile Hanımsultan. Her father was Kemaleddin Pasha, and her mother was Naime Sultan, daughter of Sultan Abdul Hamid II and Bidar Kadın. She was born on 12 November 1900 in the Ortaköy Palace. They married on 4 May 1922 in the Üsküdar Palace. On 27 January 1923, she gave birth to Hamide Nermin Nezahet Sultan in the Üsküdar Palace. They divorced on 28 March 1928 in Cairo. She then married Orhan el-Bekrî and had one son and two daughters. She died in February 1979.

== Life in exile ==
At the exile of the imperial family in March 1924, Şevket and his wife settled in Cairo, Egypt. His daughter on the other hand went to France to her maternal grandmother, because Naime Sultan argued that the couple were too young and inexperienced to care for the daughter. Nermin suffered from bone tuberculosis at a young age and was disabled. She was sent to a concentration camp in Albania by the Nazis during World War II. A British intelligence officer in Egypt, historian Lord Patrick Kinross, later had Nermin brought to Cairo by a military transport aircraft. They began to live in the Zamalek district. Farouk of Egypt gave them a salary from Ottoman foundations.

In Cairo, Şevket's house was the meeting place of the Turks in Egypt. He was closely connected with Turkish students studying at Al-Azhar University. Mustafa Sabri Efendi, the second last shaykh al-Islām living in exile, would also stay in Şevket's house. He was old and sick. He and his daughter were busy with attending to Sabri Efendi's needs. Popular personalities such as Syrian President Shukri al-Quwatli, intellectuals and businesspeople would come at his house. He had soil brought from Turkey that he wanted put in his grave when he died.

Şevket was also offered the throne of Palestine. After the Egyptian revolution of 1952, President Gamal Abdel Nasser deported him. He and his daughter then went to France with the help of French ambassador. After the age of sixty, he started working as a librarian. When the costs of treatment and medicine increased, they sold the painting, which was a gift from the French artist Henri Matisse, who was a friend of Şevket, for TL 4,000 and lived off this money.

== Death ==
Şevket died on 31 January 1973, at the age of sixty nine, in a small French town called Bagnols-sur-Cèze, and was buried there. A handful of earth from Istanbul was placed in his tomb, which Şevket had brought with him after his exile. His daughter was given a pension by the French government. She died in the forlorns ward of a hospital in 1998.

== Honours ==
Styles of Şehzade Mahmud Şevket
- Reference style: His Imperial Highness
- Spoken style: Your Imperial Highness

=== Military ranks and naval appointments ===
- 9 July 1918: Junior Officer, Ottoman Navy

=== Honorary appointments ===
- 30 July 1922: Aide-de-Camp to the Sultan

== Issue ==
Name	Birth	Death	Notes
Hamide Nermin Nezahet Sultan	27 January 1923	7 November 1998	born in Üsküdar Palace; Died unmarried in Bagnols-sur-Cèze, France, and buried there;

== Ancestry ==
Ancestors of Şehzade Mahmud Şevket

8. Mahmud II
4. Abdulaziz
9. Pertevniyal Sultan
2. Şehzade Mehmed Seyfeddin
5. Gevheri Kadın
1. Şehzade Mahmud Şevket
3. Nervaliter Hanım

== Sources ==
- Bağce, Betül Kübra (2008). II. Abdülhamid'in kızı Naime Sultan'ın hayatı (Postgraguate Thesis) (in Turkish). Marmara University Institute of Social Sciences.
- Korkmaz, Mehmet (2019-12-30). "Denizin Saraylıları: Bahriye'de Osmanlı Şehzadeleri". Hazine-i Evrak Arşiv ve Tarih Araştırmaları Dergisi (in Turkish). 1 (1): 42–65.
