= Mehmed Kemaleddin Pasha =

Ottoman military officer

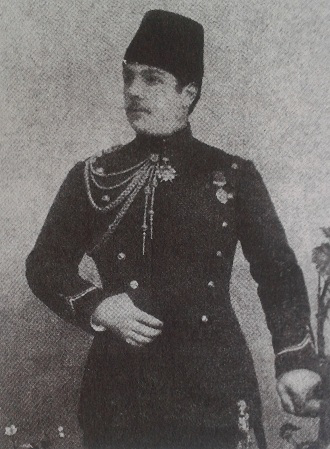
- Born: 1869
- Died: 1920 (aged 50–51)
- Rank: Mushir
- Spouse: Naime Sultan

Mehmed Kemaleddin Pasha (1869 – 1920) was an Ottoman military officer and the son of field marshal Osman Nuri Pasha. He became an imperial son-in-law (damat) through his marriage to Naime Sultan, a daughter of Sultan Abdul Hamid II. Although the marriage elevated his position within the imperial hierarchy, Kemaleddin Pasha later became involved in a clandestine relationship with Princess Hatice Sultan, the eldest daughter of Sultan Murad V. Following the exposure of this affair, he was expelled from the imperial family and exiled to Bursa.

Kemaleddin Pasha was honoured by the Serbian king with the Takovo Order and was awarded the Légion d’Honneur in 1899.

== Early life and education ==
Mehmed Kemaleddin Pasha was born in 1869 to Osman Nuri Pasha and Zatıgül Hanım, the sister of Ferik Neşet Pasha. He received his early education at the Ottoman Military School alongside his elder brother, Ali Nureddin Pasha, and the sons of other prominent Ottoman families.

== Marriage with Sultan's daughter ==
Kemaleddin Pasha married the Ottoman princess Naime Sultan in 1898, thereby becoming a damad (imperial son-in-law) of the Ottoman dynasty. The sultan appeared to use the marriage as a means of retaining influence over Osman Pasha, reflecting a long-established Ottoman practice of binding powerful statesmen to the dynasty through marital alliances, thus reinforcing political authority. Osman Pasha presented Princess Naime with a tiara, while Sultan Abdülhamid II awarded Zatıgül Hanım the Order of the Medjidie. Notably, no minister's wife had previously received this order. After the marriage, Kemaleddin Pasha was promoted from mirliva (brigadier general) to ferik (lieutenant general), and later attained the rank of mushir (field marshal) in 1903.

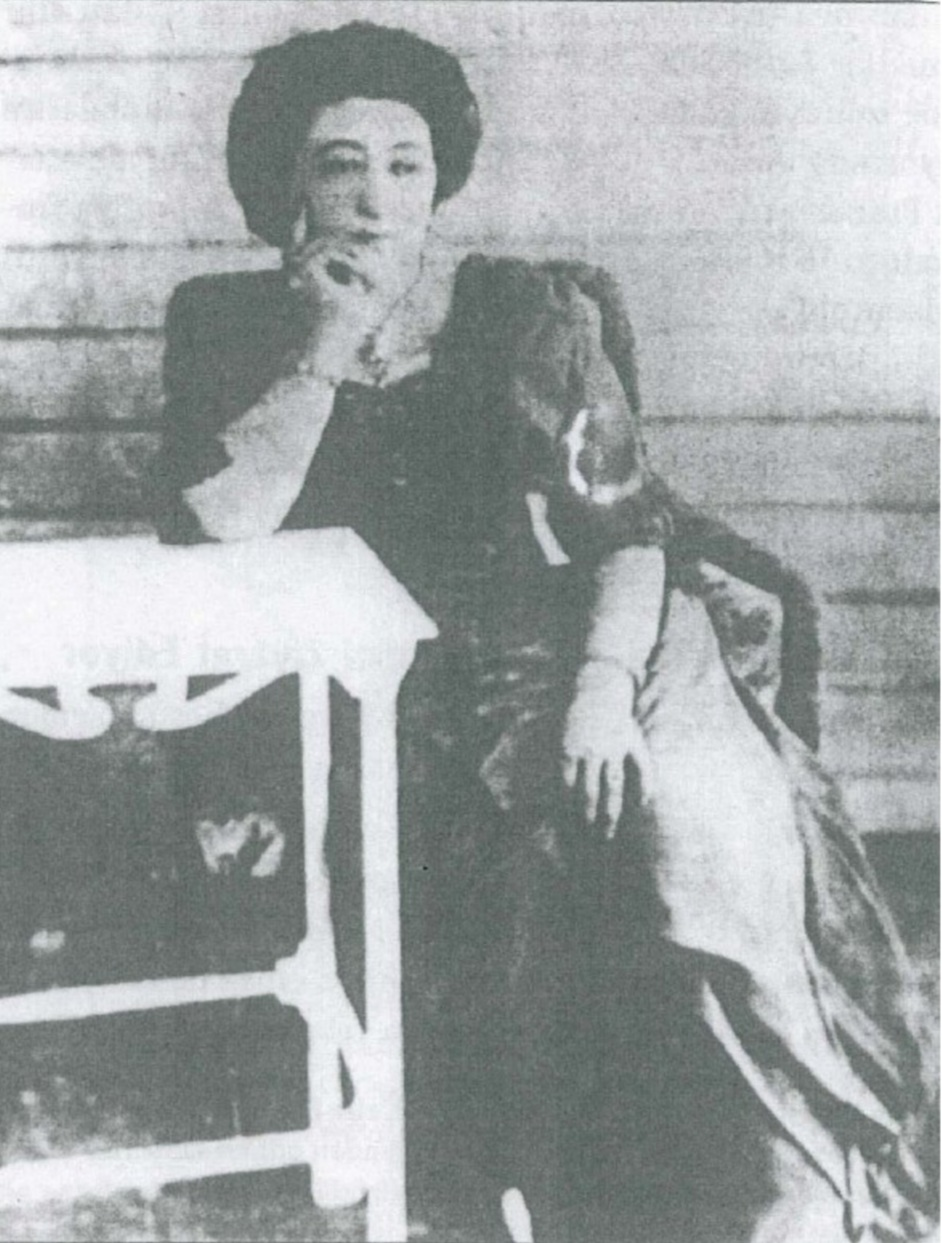
Princess Naime, the daughter of Abdul Hamid II

However, the marriage was unhappy. Kemaleddin Pasha was allegedly dissatisfied with his imperial wife, Naime Sultan. At the same time, Princess Hatice Hanım, a daughter of Sultan Murad V who resided in a neighboring mansion, was estranged from her own husband, whom she lived separately for several years prior to their divorce. During this period, Kemaleddin Pasha and Princess Hatice engaged in a secret correspondence. Eventually, their letters were intercepted in 1904, and one of them was reportedly read by Sultan Abdülhamid II.

Sultan Abdülhamid II, angered by the situation, sent Cevher Ağa to Çırağan Palace, where Murad V was confined, in order to inform him of the matter concerning his daughter Princess Hatice and Kemaleddin Pasha. Cevher Ağa conveyed it to Murad's son Prince Mehmed Selahaddin and a senior kalfa. He alleged that they had conspired to kill Naime Sultan so that they could marry, with Kemaleddin Pasha purportedly persuading the physician attending the princess to administer poison. He asserted that an investigation conducted at Yıldız Palace had concluded that the relationship had continued for three months, during which they used a ladder to cross the wall separating their residences at night. Witnesses had provided testimony regarding these meetings and searches of both residences had uncovered correspondence, while substances used in the attempted poisoning of Naime Sultan were subjected to chemical analysis. Although Prince Selahaddin attempted to withhold the news from his father, Murad eventually learnt the affair through a newspaper report. This development further aggravated his fragile mental health and lead to his subsequent death.

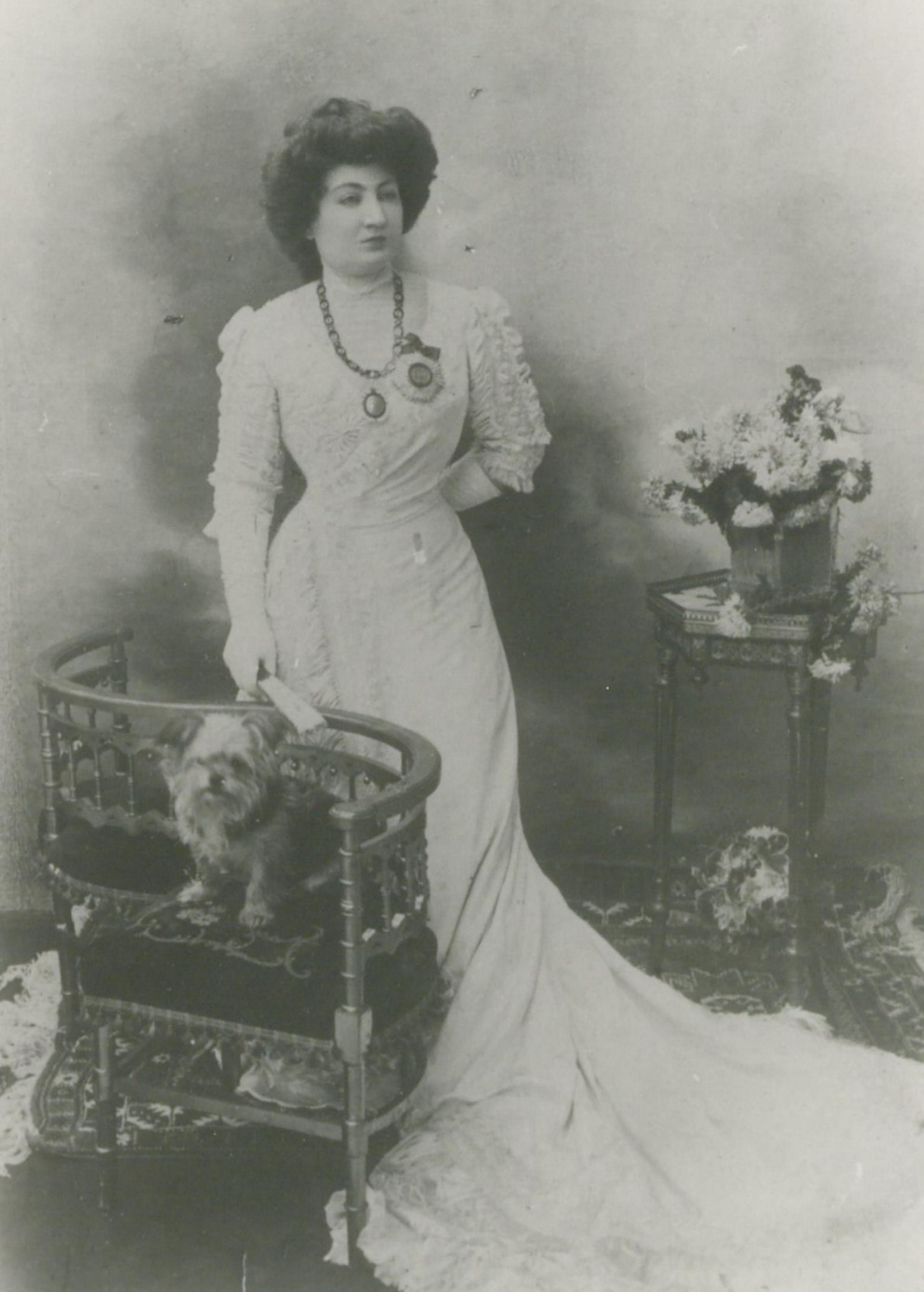
Princess Hatice, the eldest daughter of Murad V

As a result, Kemaleddin Pasha was expelled from the imperial family and exiled to Bursa. In addition to the customary loss of his status as damat, he was also stripped of his military rank and decorations.

Semih Mümtaz, whose father Reşid Mümtaz Pasha, the governor of Bursa, was responsible for supervising Kemaleddin Pasha during his internal exile, makes no mention of any alleged plot to poison Fatma Naime Sultan. Instead, he describes the relationship between Princess Hatice Hanım and Kemaleddin Pasha as having been limited to the exchange of romantic letters. Mümtaz further claims that Princess Hatice deliberately arranged for these letters to be intercepted and revealed to Sultan Abdülhamid II, in retaliation for the husband chosen for her by the sultan.

== Later life and death ==
In 1904, Kemaleddin Pasha was exiled to Bursa, which, due to its proximity to Istanbul and the governor Reşid Mümtaz Pasha's close ties to Abdul Hamid, allowed the capital to closely monitor him. Reşid Pasha, a relative of Kemaleddin Pasha, oversaw his house arrest, ensuring he remained under supervision. Kemaleddin Pasha stayed in Bursa under these conditions until the proclamation of the second Constitutional Monarchy four years later.

In 1908, following the Second Constitutional Era, he returned from exile to Constantinople. All his decorations and ranks were restored. He did not undertake any official duties after his return and lived in isolation for the rest of his life. Mehmed Kemaleddin Pasha died in 1920.

== Sources ==
- Beken, H. Gülçin, ed. (2018). "Gümüşhane Üniversitesi Sosyal Bilimler Enstitüsü Elektronik Dergisi, Cilt 9 Sayı 22". Gümüşhane University Journal of Social Sciences Institute (in Turkish). 9 (22). Gümüşhane University Social Sciences Institute.
- Örik, Nahid Sırrı (22 October 2002). Bilinmeyen Yaşamlarıyla Saraylılar (in Turkish). İstanbul: Türkiye İş Bankası Kültür Yayınları. p. 232. ISBN 9789754583830.
- Bouquet, Olivier (2015). "The Sultan's Sons-in-Law: Analysing Ottoman Imperial Damads". Journal of the Economic and Social History of the Orient. 58 (3). Brill: 327–361. doi:10.1163/15685209-12341377.
- Brookes, Douglas Scott (November 2008). The Concubine, the Princess, and the Teacher. University of Texas Press. ISBN 9780292718425.
- Uçan, Lale (2021). "Bir Sultan Ailesinin İnşâsı: Padişah II. Abdülhamid'in Kızlarından Nâile Sultan ve Damat Arif Hikmet Paşa'nın İzdivacı". Tarih Dergisi (Turkish Journal of History). 75: 191–221. doi:10.26650/iutd.963184. hdl:11352/4046.
- İnan, Süleyman (2014). "Political Marriage: The Sons‑in‑Law of the Ottoman Dynasty in the Late Ottoman State". Middle Eastern Studies. 50 (1): 61–73. doi:10.1080/00263206.2013.849698.
- Okumuş, Rüveyda (2020). "II. Abdülhamid Döneminde Yükselen Bir Devlet Adamı: Reşid Mumtaz Paşa (1856-1928)". Hazine-i Evrak Arşivcilik ve Tarih Araştırmaları Dergisi. 2 (2): 113–140.
- Bağce, Betül Kübra (2008). II. ABDÜLHAMİD’İN KIZI NAİME SULTAN’IN HAYATI (PhD dissertation) (in Turkish). Turkey: Marmara University.
