= Mathilde von Keller =

German lady-in-waiting

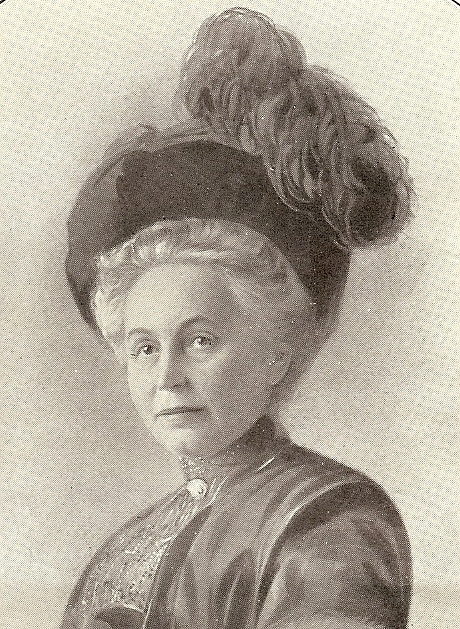
Mathilde von Keller

Mathilde von Keller (1853–1945) was a German courtier and memoir writer.

== Early life ==
Mathilde was daughter of Count Gustav von Keller (1805-1897) and his second wife Mathilde von Grolman (1813-1900).

== Court life ==
She served as lady-in-waiting to Empress Augusta Victoria of Schleswig-Holstein from 1881. She was her fourth cousin, once removed as both have descended from Count Johann Christian I of Solms-Baruth (1670-1726) and his wife Countess Helena Constantia Henckel von Donnersmarck (1677-1753). Alongside Countess Therese von Brockdorff (1846–1924) and Countess Claire von Gersdorff (1858-1927), she was a favorite of the Empress and together they were referred to as "The three Hallelujah Aunts". Her memoirs of her life at court have been published.

== Sources ==
- Mathilde Gräfin von Keller: Vierzig Jahre im Dienst der Kaiserin: Ein Kulturbild aus den Jahren 1881–1921. Koehler & Amelang, Leipzig 1935.
