= Plevna March =

Turkish marching song

Plevna March or Osman Pasha March was written in order to commemorate Osman Pasha, who led Ottoman troops in the Siege of Plevna.

== History ==
It was sung under the name of Old Plevna March by Hafız Yaşar Bey and his group in 1910 (not definite) and underwent some changes before it took its final version. According to Yaşar Bey, it had been written by Mehmet Ali Bey. According to other sources, it was written by Mithat Efendi and composed by Armenian composer Tigran Chukhajian. There are still other sources that claim the song was written by Georges Pera and composed by Edouard Taxim where these names only represent the nicknames.

Its tone is con tristezza, which means with sadness.

== Lyrics ==
Old Plevna March

Original	Translate
Tuna nehri "akmam" diyor "Etrafımı yıkmam" diyor Şanı büyük Osman Paşa "Plevne'den çıkmam" diyor Düşman Tuna'yı atladı Karakolları yokladı Osman Paşa'nın kolunda Beş bin top birden patladı	Danube River says it won't flow Says it won't ravage its surroundings Most glorious Osman Pasha; Says he won't abandon Plevna The Enemy has crossed the Danube River; And harassed the army outposts By the orders of Osman Pasha; Five thousand cannons exploded at once
