= Bidar Kadın =

Fourth consort of Abdul Hamid II (1855–1918)

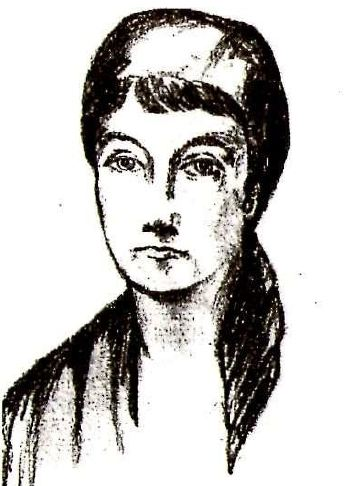
- Born: 5 May 1858; Kobuleti, Ottoman Empire
- Died: 13 January 1918 (aged 59); Erenköy Mansion, Istanbul, Ottoman Empire
- Burial: Şehzade Ahmed Kemaleddin Mausoleum, Yahya Efendi Cemetery, Istanbul
- Spouse: Abdul Hamid II (m. 1875)
- Issue: Fatma Naime Sultan; Şehzade Mehmed Abdülkadir
- Turkish: Bidar Kadın; Ottoman Turkish: بیدار قادین
- House: Talhosten (by birth); Ottoman (by marriage)
- Father: Prince Talhosten Ibrahim Bey
- Mother: Princess Şahika İffet Hanım Lortkipanidze
- Religion: Sunni Islam

Bidar Kadın (Ottoman Turkish: بیدار قادین; "enlightened"; 5 May 1858 – 13 January 1918) was a consort of Sultan Abdul Hamid II of the Ottoman Empire.

== Early life ==
Of Kabardian Circassian origin, Bidar Kadın was born on 5 May 1858 in Kobuleti. She was the daughter of the prince Ibrahim Talustan Bey and his wife, Georgian princess Şahika İffet Lortkipanidze, and had two brothers named Çerkeş Hüseyin Paşa and Çerkes Mehmed Ziya Pasha, who worked at the Sultan Palace. Her mother belonged to the Georgian noble family, Lortkipanidze. She was also related to Prince Hüseyin Bey Inalipa on the maternal side.

== Marriage ==
Bidar married the then-Prince Abdul Hamid on 2 September 1875. He was fascinated by her beauty and her bold personality. In late 1875, or early 1876, she became pregnant with the couple's first child. After Abdul Hamid's accession to the throne following the deposition of his elder brother Sultan Murad V, on 31 August 1876, she was given the title of "Fourth Kadın".

Bidar gave birth to her first child, a daughter, five days later on 4 September 1876. The child was named Fatma Naime Sultan, whom Abdul Hamid called "my Accession daughter." In 1877, Bidar and other members of the imperial family settled in the Yıldız Palace, after Abdul Hamid moved there on 7 April 1877. Here she gave birth to her second child, a son, named Şehzade Mehmed Abdülkadir, on 16 January 1878. In 1879, she was elevated to "Third Kadın".

Bidar was described as the most beautiful and fascinating of Abdülhamid II's consorts. She was tall and slender, with long brown hair and intense green eyes. Her beauty was famous also in Europe.

On 30 September 1889, she met with the German Empress Augusta Victoria in the harem of the Yıldız Palace, when the latter visited Istanbul with her husband Emperor Wilhelm II. On this occasion the countess Mathilde von Keller, lady-in-waiting to the empress, described her as "...the sultana had a beautiful face but looked extremely miserable to this day. I can't forget her expression" In 1895, she was elevated to "Second Kadın". In October 1898, she again met Empress Augusta Victoria in the grand salon of the Imperial Lodge of the Yıldız Palace, when the latter visited Istanbul for a second time with her husband. On that occasion the empress herself asked to see Bidar and noticed the beauty of Bidar and her white dress, and Bidar's fame in Europe grew.

On 27 April 1909, Abdul Hamid was deposed, and sent into exile in Thessaloniki. She followed him with her brother Mehmed Ziya Pasha. After Thessaloniki fell to Greece in 1912, Abdul Hamid returned to Istanbul, and settled in the Beylerbeyi Palace, where he died in 1918. She settled in a mansion in Fenerbahçe and later in Erenköy Palace.

== Death ==
Bidar Kadın died on 13 January 1918 at the age of fifty-nine, in Erenköy Palace, of a disease related to intestinal inflammation, ten months after the death of Sultan Abdul Hamid. She was buried in the mausoleum of Şehzade Ahmed Kemaleddin, Yahya Efendi Cemetery, Istanbul. A few months later the Empress Zita of Bourbon-Parma, visiting Istanbul, asked Sultan Mehmed V to be able to see the famous Bidar, but was informed that she had recently died.

== Issue ==
Name	Birth	Death	Notes
Fatma Naime Sultan	5 September 1876	c. 1945	married twice, and had issue, one son and one daughter
Şehzade Mehmed Abdülkadir	16 January 1878	16 March 1944	married seven times, and had issue, five sons and two daughters

== In popular culture ==
- In the 2017 TV series Payitaht: Abdülhamid, Bidar Kadın is portrayed by Turkish actress Özlem Conker.

== See also ==
- Kadın (title)
- Ottoman Imperial Harem
- List of consorts of the Ottoman sultans

== Sources ==
- Açba, Leyla (2004). Bir Çerkes prensesinin harem hatıraları. L & M. ISBN 978-9-756-49131-7.
- Brookes, Douglas Scott (2010). The Concubine, the Princess, and the Teacher: Voices from the Ottoman Harem. University of Texas Press. ISBN 978-0-292-78335-5.
- Osmanoğlu, Ayşe (2000). Babam Sultan Abdülhamid. Mona Kitap Yayinlari. ISBN 978-6-050-81202-2.
- Sakaoğlu, Necdet (2008). Bu mülkün kadın sultanları: Vâlide sultanlar, hâtunlar, hasekiler, kadınefendiler, sultanefendiler. Oğlak Yayıncılık. ISBN 978-9-753-29623-6.
- Uluçay, Mustafa Çağatay (2011). Padişahların kadınları ve kızları. Ankara: Ötüken. ISBN 978-9-754-37840-5.
