= Şehzade Mehmed Abdülkadir =

Ottoman prince, son of Sultan Abdul Hamid II (1878–1944)

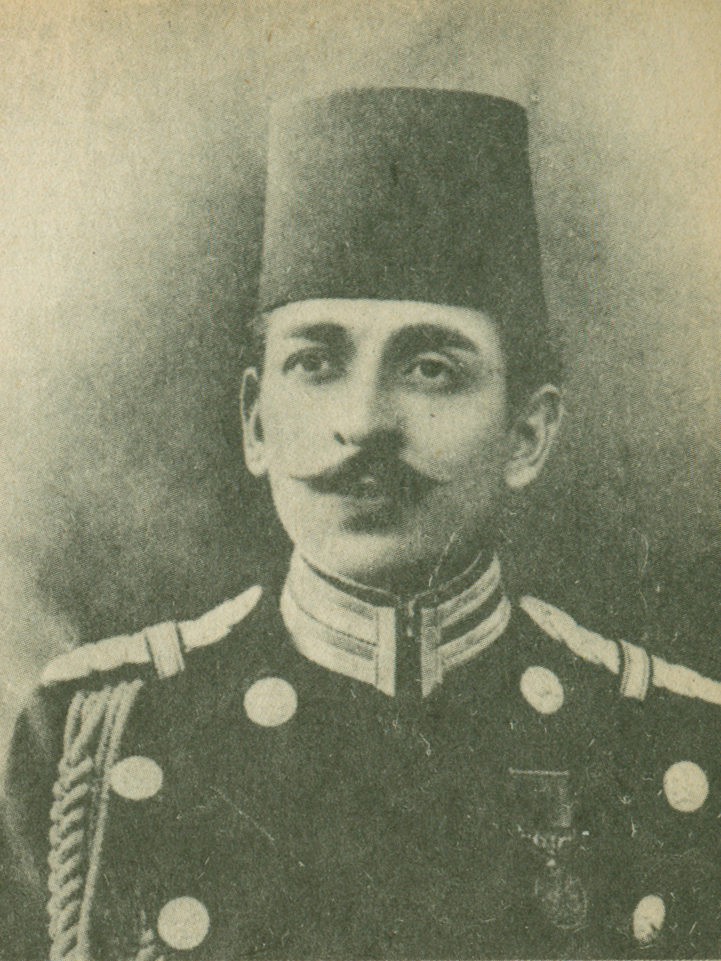
- Born: 16 January 1878; Yıldız Palace, Constantinople, Ottoman Empire (present-day Istanbul, Turkey)
- Died: 16 March 1944 (aged 66); Sofia, Bulgaria
- Burial: Sofia, Bulgaria
- Spouse: Mislimelek Hanım (m. 1898) Suhendan Hanım (m. 1902; div. 1908) Mihriban Hanım (m. 1907; div. 1913) Pervin Hanım (m. 1908; div. 1908) Macide Hanım (m. 1913; div. 1925) Meziyet Hanım (m. 1922) Irène Imer (m. 1925; div. 1926)
- Issue: Şehzade Ahmed Orhan; Şehzade Mehmed Orhan; Şehzade Ertuğrul Necib; Şehzade Alaeddin Kadir; Bidar Sultan; Safvet Neslişah Sultan; Şehzade Osman
- Dynasty: Ottoman
- Father: Abdul Hamid II
- Mother: Bidar Kadın
- Religion: Sunni Islam
- Military career
- Allegiance: Ottoman Empire
- Branch: Ottoman Army
- Service years: c. 1910–1922 (active service)
- Rank: See list

Şehzade Mehmed Abdülkadir Efendi (Ottoman Turkish: شہزادہ محمد عبدالقادر; 16 January 1878 – 16 March 1944) was an Ottoman prince, the son of Sultan Abdul Hamid II and his consort Bidar Kadın.

== Early life ==
Şehzade Mehmed Abdülkadir was born on 16 January 1878 in the Yıldız Palace. His father was Sultan Abdul Hamid II, son of Sultan Abdulmejid I and Tirimüjgan Kadın. His mother was Bidar Kadın, paternal Circassian and maternal Georgian, belonging to Lortkipanidze family. He was the second child of his mother, and had a sister Naime Sultan, who was two years older than him.

Abdülkadir's circumcision took place in 1891, together with his younger half-brothers, Şehzade Ahmed Nuri, and Şehzade Mehmed Burhaneddin.

== Education and career ==
His early education took place in the Prince's School, Yıldız Palace, together with his elder brother, Şehzade Mehmed Selim, and Sultan Abdulaziz's second son, Abdulmejid II. His tutor was Halil Agha. He spoke several languages, and was a pianist, violinist, and kemenche player. He was taught to play the violin by violinist Vondra Bey, and his classical music teacher was Aranda Pasha.

After graduating from the Prince's School, he was sent to Germany for his military education. He held the rank of major of cavalry regiment in the imperial Ottoman army. He was then promoted to colonel, and later to brigadier.

== Personal life ==
When Abdülkadir came of age, his father arranged his marriage to Emine Sultan, daughter of Sultan Abdulaziz and Neşerek Kadın. However, Emine abominated this decision and repudiated it as she didn't want to marry a man younger than her, although the Sultan considered this pertinent. The engagement was annulated by Mehmed V after Abdülhamid'II deposition.

Abdülkadir's first consort was Mislimelek Hanım. She was born in 1883. Her real name was Pakize Marshania. Her father was Prince Abdülkadir Hasan Bey Marshania (1862–1917), an Abkhazian officer in the Imperial Ottoman Army, whose family had migrated from the Caucasus, and her mother was Mevlüde Hanım. In 1890, aged seven, she was given to the palace, in order to become companion of her cousin princess Nemika Sultan. She married Abdülkadir on 10 June 1898. The marriage was performed by the Sultan's Senior Imam, Hafız Raşid Efendi and witnessed by Cevher Ağa, Esvabcıbaşı İsmet Bey, Imam of Sinan Paşa Mosque, Mustafa Asım Efendi, and the imperial harem departure manager, Ali Rıza Efendi. The wedding took place on 21 June 1898. She was the mother of Şehzade Ahmed Orhan who died in 1901. Upon the exile of the imperial family in 1924, Mislimelek went to Hungary, then in 1933 to Bulgaria and later to Albania in 1943, where she was imprisoned in a Nazi concentration camp in 1944 and 1945. At the end of World War II, she went to Beirut in 1946. She penned her memoirs in the 1950s, and died in Tripoli in 1955.

His second consort was Suhendan Hanım. She was born in 1882. She was an Abkhazian from Tokat. They married in 1902. She didn't have any children. They divorced in 1908. She died in 1929. His third consort was Mihriban Hanım. She was born in 1890. She was an Abkhazian born in Kayalar Memduhiye neighbourhood of Adapazarı. She had one brother. She was a slender, and beautiful woman, and had blonde hair. They married in 1907. She was the mother of Șehzade Mehmed Orhan, born in 1909. After the two divorced in 1913, she went to live with her brother. She died in Egypt in 1955 or 1956. His fourth consort was Pervin Hanım. She was born in 1880. They married in 1908 and divorced the same year. She died in 1917.

His fifth consort was Hatice Macide Hanım. She was born in 1899. She was the daughter of Mustafa Şerif Bey, a colonel in the Imperial Ottoman Army. In 1913, Abdülkadir showed his intentions to marry Macide. However, the parliament rejected the match on the basis of her family's social status. The prince married Macide Hanım despite the refusal. As a result, Abdülkadir and Macide were deprived of their status. Abdülkadir's salary was halved, and the children born of this marriage were deprived of titles and inheritance. She was the mother of Şehzade Ertuğrul Necib, born in 1914, and Şehzade Alaeddin Kadir, born in 1917. Upon the exile of the imperial family, Macide went to Hungary, where the couple divorced in 1925. She died in Vienna, Austria, in 1934.

His sixth consort was Meziyet Fatma Hanım. She was born in Crete in 1908. She was the daughter of Mecid Bey, Colonel in the Imperial Ottoman Army. In 1922, Abdülkadir fell in love with her. The marriage took place in the neighbourhood of Osman Ağa in Kadıköy, and was performed by Imam Süleyman Efendi in the presence of the representatives and witnesses of the parties. Soon after, the incident was reported to the council. On the other hand, a man named Selim Sipahi, alleged that Meziyet was his wife. However, his claim was rejected because before the marriage, they had obtained permission form the Heybeli Ada Imam Şevket Efendi and the Naib of Kartal District Court of religious law. However, as the marriage was performed without the parliament's permission, it was rejected. Meziyet and the children born from this marriage were deprived from their status. She was the mother of Bidar Sultan, born in 1924, and Safvet Neslişah Sultan, born in 1925. In accordance to the Surname Law, she took the surname "Osmanoğlu". She died on 13 November 1989, and was buried in Karacaahmet Cemetery, Istanbul.

His seventh consort was Irène Imer. They married in 1925. She gave birth to Şehzade Osman the same year. They divorced in 1926.

== Later life and death ==
On 27 April 1909, Abdul Hamid was deposed, and sent into exile in Thessaloniki. Abdülkadir, however, remained in Istanbul. After Thessaloniki fell to Greece in 1912, Abdul Hamid returned to Istanbul, and settled in the Beylerbeyi Palace, where he died in 1918. He had been allocated a villa on the grounds of the Yıldız Palace. Between 1909 and 1924, he lived in the Kızıltoprak Palace and Büyükdere waterfront Palace.

At the exile of the imperial family in March 1924, Abdülkadir and his family settled in Budapest, Kingdom of Hungary. On 14 January 1925, he gave the power of attorney to Sami Günzberg, a well-known Turkish Jewish lawyer, authorising him to regain from usurpers buildings, lands, mines, concessions left by Abdul Hamid situated in Turkish territory and elsewhere. After which, he sold Abdülkadir's mansion in Feneryolu to the former Khediva Ikbal Hanim. However, he didn't send money to the prince. Günzberg also transferred the prince's stake in Mosul oil to the American Oil Company, and sent a small amount of money to the prince for ten years.

Abdülkadir and his family later went to Sofia, Bulgaria, in 1933. In 1943, he renovated the mausoleum of Bali Efendi in Sofia. The prince suffered a heart attack in the bunker during an air raid of American aircraft on 16 March 1944. He died by being crushed during the stampede. He was buried in Sofia.

== Honours ==
Styles of Şehzade Mehmed Abdülkadir
- Reference style: His Imperial Highness
- Spoken style: Your Imperial Highness

- Order of the House of Osman, Jeweled
- Order of Glory, Jeweled
- Order of Distinction, Jeweled
- Order of Osmanieh, Jeweled
- Order of the Medjidie, Jeweled
- Imtiyaz Medal in Silver
- Imtiyaz Medal in Gold
- Liakat War Medal in Gold
- Hicaz Demiryolu Medal in Gold
- Iftikhar Sanayi Medal in Gold
- Greek War Medal in Gold
- Outstanding Navy Medal in Gold

=== Military appointments ===
Military ranks and army appointments

- Major of the Cavalry Regiment, Ottoman Army
- Colonel of the Cavalry Regiment, Ottoman Army
- Brigadier of the Cavalry Regiment, Ottoman Army

== Children ==
Name	Birth	Death	Notes
By Mislimelek Hanım (married 10 June 1898; 1883 – 1955)
Şehzade Ahmed Orhan	1901	1901	born and died in infancy in Yıldız Palace; buried in Yahya Efendi Cemetery
By Mihriban Hanım (married 1907– divorced 1913; 1890 – 1955–56)
Şehzade Mehmed Orhan	12 October 1909	13 March 1994	married thrice, and had issue, one son, and two daughters
By Hatice Macide Hanım (married 1913 – divorced 1925; 1899 – 1934)
Şehzade Ertuğrul Necib Ali Kadir	27 March 1914	7 February 1994	Doctor. He married in Vienna on 14 August 1946 to Austrian Gertrude Emilia Tengler (Vienna, born 25 May 1926), and had issue, one son (Roland Selim) and one daughter (Margot Leyla); died in Vienna, and buried there
Şehzade Alaeddin Kadir	2 January 1917	21 November 1999	married Lydia Dimitrov, and had issue, one son (Plamen) one daughter (Iskra); died in Sofia, Bulgaria, and buried there
By Meziyet Fatma Hanım (married 1922; 1908 – 13 November 1989)
Bidar Sultan	3 January 1924	8 March 1924	born in Istanbul; died Pest, Budapest, Hungary; buried in Gül Baba Shrine
Safvet Neslişah Sultan	25 December 1925	30 May 2014	married twice, and had issue, two sons
By Irène Imer (married 1925 – divorced 1926)
Şehzade Osman	1925	1934	born in Pest, Budapest, Hungary; died Pest, Budapest, Hungary; buried in Gül Baba Shrine

== In popular culture ==
- In the 2017 TV series Payitaht: Abdülhamid, Şehzade Mehmed Abdülkadir is portrayed by Turkish actor Can Sipahi.

== Sources ==
- Brookes, Douglas Scott (2010). The Concubine, the Princess, and the Teacher: Voices from the Ottoman Harem. University of Texas Press. ISBN 978-0-292-78335-5.
- Kırpık, Cevdet (2011). "Şehzade Evliliklerinde Değişim". OTAM (in Turkish) (26): 165–192.
- Osmanoğlu, Ayşe (2000). Babam Sultan Abdülhamid. Mona Kitap Yayinlari. ISBN 978-6-050-81202-2.
- Uluçay, Mustafa Çağatay (2011). Padişahların kadınları ve kızları. Ankara: Ötüken. ISBN 978-9-754-37840-5.
