= Payitaht: Abdülhamid =

Turkish historical revisionist television series (2017–2021)

- Also known as: The Last Emperor; The Capital: Abdul Hamid
- Based on: Ottoman Sultan Abdul Hamid II
- Written by: Osman Bodur; Uğur Uzunok
- Directed by: Serdar Akar; Emre Konuk; Doğan Ümit Karaca; Şevki Es
- Starring: Bülent İnal
- Country of origin: Turkey
- Original languages: Turkish, Urdu (Dubbed)
- No. of seasons: 5
- No. of episodes: 154

Production
- Producer: ES Film
- Production location: Turkey
- Running time: 154 minutes (45–50 minutes on PTV Home)

Original release
- Network: TRT 1 TRT HD
- Release: 24 February 2017 – 4 June 2021

Payitaht: Abdülhamid (lit. 'The Capital: Abdul Hamid'), named The Last Emperor in English, is a Turkish fictional and historical revisionist drama series starring Bülent İnal depicting historical events set during the reign of the 34th Ottoman sultan, Abdul Hamid II.

== Plot ==
The series fictionalizes the major events that marked the last 13 years of the reign of Sultan Abdul Hamid II, who ruled the Ottoman Empire from its capital, the payitaht, from a historical revisionist perspective. It depicts the political developments following the Greco-Turkish War of 1897 by referring to the dissident Young Turks, who were constitutionalists, and the Freemasons, who are the subject of many conspiracy theories. It incorrectly portrays Theodor Herzl's demand for land in Palestine with events that did not actually happen. Throughout his reign, the Sultan faced opposition from all sides, from the United Kingdom and Russia to those who were supposedly loyal to him.

=== Season 1 ===
The series starts during the 20th year of the Sultan's reign. They are planning a big project, the Hejaz railway. However, the Sultan's brother-in-law, Mahmud Pasha, the British, and Theodor Herzl are trying to sabotage this project. In the harem, on the other hand, a strong rivalry between Bidar Kadin and Seniha Sultan extends to their family. Also, the Sultan's brother Murad's daughters come to the palace. His eldest daughter, Hatice Sultan, falls in love with Kemalettin Pasha and plans to marry him while on the other hand Naime Sultan, the Sultan's daughter, also is in love with Kemalettin and tries to win his heart, eventually becoming ill. Hatice Sultan with her love for Naime pretends that Kemalettin loves Naime by giving a Naime a letter which Kemalettin had written to Hatice.

Mahmud Pasha, Seniha Sultan's husband, piles slander upon slander on Mehmed Pasha, Bidar Sultan's brother, eventually causes his exile. Abdülkadir, the Sultan's son, is consistently manipulated by Mahmud Pasha and his son Sabahattin, and while trying to ruin their game gets himself into a deeper mess, getting stuck in a burning room with his mother at the end of the season which was started by Esma, a traitor servant girl, at Sabahattin's order. The Kingdom of Greece attacks Ottoman territory, and the season ends with the Ottoman Empire declaring war on Greece.

=== Season 2 ===
The new century begins. Sultan Abdül Hamid changed the fortune of the Ottoman Empire, who had not been victorious in the last two centuries, and won the Greek War. The war that ended at the front continues at the table now. The world knows he was one of the greatest Sultan of the Ottoman empire.

Alexendar Israel Parvus, the proclaimed vizier of the Global Monarchy, pretends to be an engineer and enters the palace. The Sultan is preparing the state for a great war with his development moves and launches the oil move that starts wars for the new century after the railway move. While Parvus is struggling to end the Payitaht with agents spread all over Istanbul under the leadership of Marco, his right-hand man, Sultan Abdülhamid's extraordinary and successful nephew, Murad, fights with his team at the expense of their lives.

Sultan Abdülhamid is unaware of the storms in his harem while fighting to protect Payitaht. Entering to avenge her mother, who was fired from the palace, Firuze helps the enemies in their war against the Ottoman Dynasty. She gets Abdülkadir to fall in love with her, and causes all the balances to turn upside down between Bidar Sultan and Seniha Sultan. At the end of the season, Bidar Sultan, who left the palace, has an accident and her carriage falls down a cliff, severely injuring her. Parvus, although in a cage, makes a plan to kill the entire palace; using a man named Mr. Crowly, he injects poison gas into the palace by using a new invention, the radiator, and poisons everyone during a ceremony. But at the end, Fehim Pasha, risking his life, shot Mr. Crowly, dying in the process.

=== Season 3 ===
In the palace, the wounds of the last serious incident are tried to be healed, and the death of Fehim Pasha is mourned. Sultan Abdülhamid ensured Parvus was thrown into the dungeon in Britain. The partner of this plan, Crowly, is found where he is hiding in Egypt and punished by Halil Halid. Fuad Efendi, the son of a former Khedive of Egypt Ismail Pasha, comes to the Payitaht. Bidar Sultan cannot forget what has happened to her. Moreover, she cannot make anyone believe what she remembers about her accident, which is that it was deliberate and that she was kidnapped and taken to someone's house; everyone just calls it nightmares. Meanwhile, Shivenaz (Lila), fiancé of Fuad Efendi and daughter of Edmond Rothschild, comes to the palace and makes problems in the harem.

The Young Turks become a true organization when Sabahattin goes to Paris and becomes a leader. Sultan Abdülhamid sends Zühtü Pasha, who everyone thinks is a traitor, to Paris as a spy. However, when he learns that one of the Pashas actually is a spy, he calls the head of intelligence, Ahmet Celalettin Pasha, to find the traitor. Around the end of the season, Fuad Efendi's betrayal is uncovered and he is shot by Ahmet Pasha, while at the end of the season his fiancée Shivenaz is killed by Şehzade Abdülkadir and the Young Turks start a revolution, attacking the palace. Tahsin Pasha, Mahmud Pasha, and Ahmet Pasha are all shot and the Sultan and his family are stuck inside the burning palace.

=== Season 4 ===
The revolution was suppressed and the fire in the palace was extinguished. However, its consequences and destruction continue. Sultan Abdülhamid makes Veladet-i-Humayun celebrations to show that the Ottoman Empire was not destroyed and cannot be destroyed easily. The news of victory from Payitaht brings together the adversaries of Abdül Hamid once again. During the celebration, Zülüflü İsmail Pasha is revealed to be the elder brother of Sultan Abdülhamid, surprising everyone including the enemies. Cemile Sultan, who came to Payitaht for Veladet-i-Humayun celebrations, manages to disturb everyone in the harem, causing Seniha Sultan to leave.

Meanwhile, Zalman David Levontin comes to Payitaht disguised as Mr. Gustav, making secret moves against Sultan Abdülhamid. Zalman is eventually exposed and punished, so the British send William Hechler as an ambassador. A second railway project in Baghdad was established in addition to the Hejaz railway, posing a threat to the British in terms of strategic location. Hechler openly becomes enemies with Sultan Abdülhamid, making many moves before being defeated and imprisoned. However, one of Hechler's men arranges an assassination for the Sultan and shoots at him with a sniper which injures Ahmed Pasha (not shown) and the season ends there.

=== Season 5 ===
Season 5 begins with Ferid Pasha becoming the Grand Vizier. Sultan Abdülhamid's older brother Murad V passes away, leaving behind an heir that will take his place in the Freemasons, which he left in his will in the form of a composition. It is not long before the composition is decoded by a man. Ahmed, İsmail and Selim Pasha were ordered to follow that man on a train to Thessaloniki, but he is killed, raising suspicion on the three. Since a meeting for the Masons was held in Thessaloniki around that time, either one of them could have been the Mason Pasha. All three Pashas were questioned. İsmail and Ahmed Pasha called each other the traitor, and someone named Manyas confronts both of them with conflicting information about the other's supposed treachery. Manyas is also the one in contact with the real Mason Pasha and is associated with the Young Turks. After losing trust and being demoted from his rank, Ahmed Pasha secretly turns against Sultan Abdülhamid and sides with Manyas and an opposition leader, Ahmed Riza. Many people were suspected by the Sultan. A Grand Lodge of the Masons is established after the previous one at Thessaloniki, consisting of Karasu, Sabahattin, Fernandez, Selim Pasha and others. The Sultan's son Ahmed Nuri arrives to help defeat the Masons and the opposition. While Selim Pasha is seemingly discovered to be the Mason Pasha, he was instead being threatened by Mahmud Pasha to work on behalf of him.

After a series of events Mahmud Pasha is forced to flee from the palace and takes refuge with the British embassy and the Masons. Mahmud Pasha moved to Paris but before moving tells the Sultan that he was actually a spy inside the Masons. He reveals that he joined the Masons to destroy them internally. He also reveals he is very sick. In Paris, Mahmud Pasha obtains information from his opposition son Sabahattin and Karasu. He sends this information to then palace to help destroy Mason's and keep the Empire safe. Mahmud Pasha then dies due to sickness. After a violent turn of events Abdülhamid restores the constitutional monarchy and dismisses Tahsin Pasha from duty.

The series then skips many years into the future. It is revealed that Tahsin Pasha was dismissed and given a secret duty to document all the events that took place in the Reign of the Sultan Abdülhamid. Tahsin Pasha then tells a journalist the many events that took place during the Sultan's reign. It is revealed that Sogutlu Osman died in the line of duty for the State. A brief encounter also occurred between the dethroned Abdülhamid and Talaat Pasha, who was then a prominent figure of the government. It is told that they spoke about the reasons for Ottomans Joining WW1, and also about certain fortifications made by the Sultan to prevent European entry into the capital. It is mutually known to both that the Ottoman Empire was about to collapse. The funeral of Abdülhamid is also shown.

The season and series ends with Sultan Abdülhamid's dream of walking down a long hall seeing the great previous Ottoman rulers. The rulers shown were Suleiyman the Lawgiver, Selim the Stern, Mehmed the Conqueror, and finally, Osman Gazi. Each ruler gives a short message to Abdülhamid. The final scene shows Abdülhamid standing in front of a painting of himself in the hall.

== Cast and characters ==
=== Season 1 ===
Character	Played by	Appearance in episodes	Description
Sultan Abdülhamid II	Bülent İnal	1–154	Sultan Abdülhamid is the titular character and is the last Sultan to hold executive powers in Ottoman Empire. Sultan Abdülhamid is a seasoned politician and statesman. He is trying to preserve the Empire from external as well as internal threats. He survives many assassination attempts. Supporters call him "Ulu Hakan" or the "Great Khagan" whereas opponents call him "Kızıl Sultan" or the "Red Sultan". As the Caliph of Islam, Abdülhamid wants to modernize and industrialize the empire while retaining Islamic and cultural values. His dream project is Hejaz Railway to connect the Muslim world from Sarajevo to Baghdad to the Holiest sites in Islam. He is shown to be the de facto head of the secret police and intelligence services of the Empire. He uses superior intelligence and political science to fight against many plots made against him by the opposition. In season 5 Sultan Abdülhamid restores the constitutional monarchy and parts of his life after dethronement are shown at the start of many episodes. His death is shown at the end of season 5, along with his funeral.
Tahsin Pasha	Bahadır Yenişehirlioğlu	1–154	The head of chamberlains and First Secretary of the palace. He is the most loyal person and the right-hand man of the Sultan and the Sultan trusts him with his life. He is always present with the Sultan. For him, the state means the Sultan. He has been working for the state since he was 13 years old. At the end of season 5, after being dismissed from being a Pasha, Tahsin is tasked with a duty to document the events that took place during the reign of Sultan Abdülhamid.
Mahmud Pasha	Hakan Boyav	1–154	Brother-in-law of the Sultan and husband of Seniha Sultan. He is one of the antagonists for the first season and the beginning of the second season. He is greedy and treacherous, always ready to switch sides. He is the main conspirator of several assassination attempts on the Sultan and tries to sabotage the Hejaz Railway project. He is also the best comic relief character. Mahmud Pasha becomes loyal after helping the Sultan find the killer of Sultan Abdülaziz and is believed to be a trustworthy and clever Pasha whose former ties with traitors could come in handy. However, in Season 5, he is revealed to be the traitor Mason Pasha and keeps suspicion away from himself by pretending to be in a wheelchair. However, he did this to end the Freemasons and is still loyal to the Sultan. He used Sabahattin and Karasu in Paris to send information about Masons to Sultan Abdulhamid. Falls ill by the end of Season 5 and is known to have passed away. His body remains in Paris despite many attempts by Sultan Abdülhamid to have it transported to Payitaht.
Bidar Sultan	Özlem Conker	1–128	Wife of Sultan Abdülhamid, the empress, and matriarch of the palace. Intelligent and not easy to fool, she is the mother of Prince Abdülkadir and Naime Sultan. Often argues with Seniha Sultan but befriends her later on. After encountering several betrayals, becomes very paranoid and disturbs everyone in the palace, even her own children, repeatedly accusing everyone of being a traitor. Kicks many people out of the palace. Leaves the palace and goes to Bursa after giving away important state information due to being threatened with her son, Abdülkadir. Comes back to the palace when she is working with Aliye Sultan. Leaves Palace during Season 5.
Seniha Sultan	Selen Özturk	1–89	Sultan Abdülhamid's sister and wife of Mahmud Pasha. She loves her brother and always wants him out of harm's way. She is smart and cunning. She stands out with her ambitious and brave personality. She depends on the traditions and rules of the state. Has a rivalry with Bidar Kadın. Although she likes Sultan Abdülhamid very much, the continuation of the Ottoman Dynasty is more important to her. She couldn't bear the domination of Cemile Sultan. Doesn't appear in the fourth season after the first episode as she goes to Umrah with her son Lütfullah.
Şehzade Mehmed Abdülkadir	Can Sipahi	1–127	Son of Sultan Abdülhamid II and Bidar Kadın. He is arrogant, pampered by his mother, and spoiled by his uncle Mahmud Pasha who wants to use him as a pawn. He usually thinks he is above everyone in the palace and often argues with people over Ahsen, his first love interest. He causes trouble for the Sultan and exhibits a lot of personal and ideological differences with his father. He often reads the opposition's newspapers. His best friend is his cousin Sabahattin, who repeatedly tricks him into making many mistakes. Falls in love with Firuze but eventually realizes she is a traitor. Marries Mislimelik (Pakize) initially just to spite Sabahattin but gets along well until Mislimelik's sister dies, and then they divorce. Leaves the palace during Season 5 to start a new life with Meziyet, who he wants to marry. His character is pretty much always engaged with women.
Prince Sabahaddin	Kaan Turgut	1–154	Son of Seniha Sultan and Mahmud Pasha. He is a leader of the Young Turks. He is cunning like his father and acts as his right-hand man in manipulating Prince Abdülkadir. There is nothing he will not do for independence. He is ideologically more rabid than his father. Is a traitor and flees the Empire. Collaborates with Armenian gangs, Rothschild, Zalman, and Karasu to bring trouble to Sultan Abdülhamid. Is a close ally and partner of Karasu. Uses his father's weakness against him to his benefit multiple times. Works with the Opposition and is part of the Masons. He seems to develop some affection for his homeland when being used by his father in Paris.
Naime Sultan	Duygu Gurcan	1–147	Sultan Abdülhamid II and Bidar Kadın's favorite daughter. Very naive and spoiled. In love with Kemalettin Pasha but goes for revenge after finding out his affair with Hatice Sultan. Was close friends with Şivenaz and was shocked by her betrayal. Very sad after her mother leaves the palace and insists she will return. Frequently accuses Saliha Sultan of various things she did and is very close to her cousin, Aliye, not knowing that she is a traitor. Sent by Abdülhamid to her mother.
Sultan Murad V	Nevzat Yılmaz	1–54	Elder brother of Sultan Abdülhamid II and was the Sultan before him. He is shown after deposition in exile in Çırağan Palace. Fond of his brother's political abilities and always praises him and compares him better than himself to rule the state. Is also a Freemason. His death is spoken of at the beginning of Season 5 but not shown; leaves an heir to his position in the Freemasons.
Theodor Herzl	Saygın Soysal	1–44	The main antagonist of the first season. Herzl is an Austro-Hungarian Zionist. He wants to establish a Zionist state in Palestine and tries to convince the Sultan to let him buy land from Palestine, but is not allowed. He repeatedly publishes fake news against Sultan Abdülhamid II to defame him and the Ottoman Empire. Works with Parvus but does not really like him, exposing the fact that he had killed Sara Hedeya to Karasu. His death is spoken of by Hechler but not shown.
Kolağası Celal	Umud Kurt	1–9	Good with guns, an expert marksman, and a loyal soldier of the Sultan. He is an officer in the Sultan's secret police. Close friends with Ömer, Yusuf, and Kemalettin Pasha. In love with Naime Sultan and sends a letter confessing that to her before dying; is shot while transporting weapons.
Mehmed Kemaleddin Pasha	Eren Hacısalihoğlu	1–54	Son of Gazi Osman Pasha, one of Sultan Abdülhamid's most trusted men. Was very close friends with Celal and was devastated when he died. Fell in love with Hatice Sultan but married Naime Sultan on his father's insistence. Causes several heart problems for his father. His previous relationship with Hatice is exposed later but when the truth of Naime's revenge is revealed, they are forgiven by the Sultan. He divorces Naime and is sent to Bursa for a new duty.
Ömer	Akın Akınözü	1–17	Brave, dashing, and fearless cabby, he is a commoner. He saves the Sultan during an assassination attempt and becomes a favourite young admirer of the Sultan. Becomes closely tied with the palace and is allowed into the secret room after saving the Sultan. His best friends are Yusuf and Celal, who works in the Secret Police. He is romantically interested in Ahsen which causes him to get in trouble with Şehzade Mehmed Abdülkadir. Argues with Yusuf at the end of season 1 and is drawn into a trap while trying to resolve the argument; is shot by Yusuf by accident while they grappled over a gun and is martyred. Mentioned in Season 2 by Ahsen and Yusuf.
Yusuf	İbrahim Kendirci	1–27	He was born and raised on the same street as Ömer. When Yusuf lost his family at 13, he, along with his sister Zeynep, moved in with Ömer's family. Together with Ömer, he is sworn to fight. Although he used to lose his money, become indebted, and become imprisoned because of cockfighting, starts earning his money in honest ways after Ömer's death. Collaborates with Murad and Söğütlü Osman after Ahsen introduces them and assists in some of their spy missions. Is fatally shot by Vladimir.
Gazi Osman Pasha	Aydın Sigalı	1–53	The legendary Ottoman Commander who defended the city during the Siege of Plevna in the Russo-Turkish War. He is the father of Kemalettin Pasha and one of the most trusted men of Sultan Abdülhamid II. Is very loyal to the Sultan. Dies of a heart attack while telling Abdülhamid II that the Masons are going to kill the whole palace and enthrone Murad V.
Melike (Ahsen)	Ezgi Eyüboğlu	1–39	A beautiful girl from the Balkans who loses her memory in an accident during the chaos of an assassination attempt on the Sultan. Intelligent, with a big heart and good intentions. She becomes a royal guest after losing her memory and becomes a love interest for Prince Abdülkadir, who runs into trouble with Ömer and later Murad. It is later found out that Sara Hedaya sent her to the palace to kill Sultan Abdülhamid; however, after retrieving her memory, she sees that the Sultan is not a bad person and finds out that he was not the person who killed her father. Falls in love with Ömer and grieves for his death till Season 2, when she meets Murad. Joins many spy missions with Murad Efendi and Söğütlü Osman, finally getting engaged to Murad. While shopping for a wedding dress, she is shot by Vladimir, who was coming in a nearby cab. Is taken to the palace infirmary and dies there. Sister of Samir Effendi.
Fehime Sultan	Elif Ozkul	1–51	Ottoman Sultan Murad V's second daughter. Abdülhamid treats her like his own daughter, although she is forbidden to meet her father. She is innocent and sometimes foolish, unlike her sister. Later helps Bidar Sultan learn the plans her sister Hatice Sultan and Seniha Sultan make. Returns to her father's palace.
Hatice Sultan	Gözde Kaya	1–54	Sultan Murad V's eldest daughter. Doesn't like her uncle due to what happened to her father. Full of dreams of freedom and marriage. Is in love with Kemalettin but marries Vasfi Pasha after promising to marry him so that she could see her dad. She later begins a new life with Vasfi but when her relationship with Kemalettin is exposed, Vasfi divorces her. She rejects Kemalettin's offer to start a new life in Bursa and goes back to her father's palace.
Hiram	Berkan Şal	1–18	An Armenian priest sent by the Vatican but he is more than a pastor. He is an atheist professional assassin. He is known to have committed his first murder at the age of four. He attempted to assassinate Sultan Abdülhamid but fails. Sultan Abdülhamid confronts him in prison with some emotional details about his past, after which he becomes a double agent for him.
Samir	Emre Kentmenoğlu	1–9	Brother of Melike. He is a journalist by profession who believes in violent revenge for the death of his father who is believed to be killed during a rebellion against the Empire in the Balkans. He too wants to kill the Sultan. However, he learns the truth about his dad and has Ahsen write his apology in a notebook before dying after being shot by Hiram.
Sara Hedeya	Elena Viunova	1–17	Assistant and personal secretary of Herzl. Formarly the fiancée of Emanuel Karasu. Love interest of Herzl himself. Has romantic relations with Parvus for personal gain. She is a hardcore Zionist herself. Took care of Ahsen and Samir and encouraged Ahsen to assassinate the Sultan; however, eventually got Samir killed by Hiram when he finds out that Parvus was the one who actually killed their father. Killed by Parvus's man who is disguised as an Ottoman soldier thus raising suspicions and putting the blame for her death on the Sultan. This blame is later removed by Herzl in the eyes of Karasu.
Zulfet Kalfa	Zeynep Ozan	1–128	Right Hand of Bidar Sultan in the harem. Very Loyal. Leaves alongside her Season 5.
Emanuel Karasu	Ali Nuri Türkoğlu	2-154	He is a well-known member of the Young Turks. Was the fiancé of Sara Hedeya. He is a member of a well-known merchant family of Zionists who plots to overthrow the Empire. He is the pioneer of Freemasonry activities in the Ottoman State and recruits Talat Bey to the Masons. Works for the Sultan for some time giving him important information. Has a daughter named Frida Karasu.
Söğütlü Osman	Yusuf Aytekin	2-154	Born in Söğüt, the founding location of the Ottoman Empire. Becomes a soldier after his brother, a soldier, was martyred in an assassination attempt on the Sultan. Is given the job of staying with Ömer and becomes close friends with him and Yusuf. After the death of Ömer, begins to work as a spy with Murad/Meyyit Efendi and then Fehim Pasha. Works with Halil Halid, Tatar Salih, Asaf Emre and Nadir Bey after Halil Halid comes from Egypt. Works with Eşref Aziz later on. Is martyred from a gunshot.
Fatma Psend Sultan	Zeynep Özder	4–17	Wife of Sultan Abdülhamid II; is pregnant. At first, she was determined to stay out of the harem politics but her servant Esma, who was a traitor working for Gertrude Bell, convinced her to get Bidar Sultan into a hard spot.
Rahıme Perestu Valide Sultan	Şefika Tolun	7–8	Abdülhamid is her adopted son. Comes to the palace after receiving news from Fatma Psend Sultan about indulging of Bidar Sultan and Seniha Sultan in family politics to warn them.
Basil Zaharoff	Adnan Biricik	10–17	A gun trader. Works with Herzl.

=== Season 2 ===
Character	Played by	Appearance in episodes	Description
Aleksandr İsrail Parvus	Kevork Malikyan	18–54	A rich Zionist who funds various anti-Ottoman factions. Killed Melike and Samir's father Efraim Efendi and framed the Sultan for it; also had Sara Hedeya killed and framed the Sultan for that as well. Pretends to be Gerfand Efendi, an engineer and old friend of Sultan Abdülhamid, in order to enter the palace and disrupt the Sultan's plans. Sets up a Masonic Lodge with Sabahattin, Karasu, Crowly, and others. Sent to British prisons as a result of the Sultan's plan, he was just an added charge.
Lord William	Ercument Fidan	18–112	British ambassador to the Ottoman Empire. Works with enemies against the Sultan. Replaced by William Hechler
Rus Sefir	Cem Uras	18-153	Russian ambassador to the Ottoman Empire. Works with enemies against the Sultan.
Murad Efendi (Meyyit Efendi)	Volkan Keskin	18–54	Sultan Abdülhamid's nephew, as Murad's mother and the Sultan were milk siblings. One of the most trusted spies, along with Söğütlü Osman. Falls in love with Ahsen and eventually proposes to her. However, while Ahsen is shopping for a wedding dress, she is shot by Vladimir, Parvus's man. Murad kills the wrong person in trying to take revenge and was supposed to be executed; however, he does not die thanks to Sultan Abdülhamid, who gives him the name Meyyit Efendi. Works with Fehim Pasha for the rest of the season. Only appears in season 2.
Marco	Nik Xhelilaj	18–27	Parvus's man. Is very loyal to Parvus and is friends with Vladimir. Fights often with Murad Efendi. Is killed by Murad Efendi after trying to kill Mahmud Pasha.
Şadiye Sultan	Leya Kırşan	18–42	Daughter of Sultan Abdülhamid II and Emsalinur Kadın. An innocent, young girl who loves to play the piano. Gets along well with Bidar Sultan and pretty much everyone. Adores her father. Enters the palace with nanny Firuze.
Firuze	Cemre Baysel	18–38	Daughter of Fatma Kalfa who was fired from the palace by Bidar Sultan on the charge of theft. Comes to the Yıldız Palace as the nanny of Şadiye Sultan. Persuades Şehzade Abdülkadir to fall in love with her so that she can marry him and become a Sultana and take revenge of her mother. Her dream remains unfulfilled as she is put into prison, where she commits suicide after her true greedy and vengeful nature is revealed.
Selim Pasha	Taner Erturkler	18-154	A Pasha of Sultan Abdülhamid. Loyal, but is fooled by Herzl after his daughter Dilşat is killed. Unsuccessfully competes with Mahmud Pasha for the post of Grand Vizier. Leaves for the Arab lands in season 2, but there Zalman finds him and tortures him until he loses his mind and forgets his own name, calling himself Maktel. However, eventually recovers and kills Zalman. After many events, he was suspected to be the Freemason Pasha, which later turned out to be false, as he was threatened with his brother Necip.
Zuhtu Pasha	Latif Koru	18–88	A loyal Pasha of Sultan AbdulHamid. In Season 3 he goes to Paris and joins the Young Turks as a spy for the Sultan. After some time Sabahettin and Karasu find out the truth. Returns to Payitaht after being exposed.
Gerfand Efendi	Vedat Ulutas	18–29	A German merchant and friend of Sultan Abdulhamid. Captured by Parvus and tries to escape but is threatened with his family. His wife leaves a note in the palace calling for help. Eventually rescued by Söğütlü Osman and Murad Effendi.
Vasfi Bey	Eray Turk	18–54	Works under Kemalettin Pasha and marries Hatice Sultan and is ready to do whatever it takes to make her happy and even bears her hate towards him. Figures out the affair of Hatice Sultan and Kemalettin Pasha. After the Sultan forgives Hatice Sultan and Kemalettin Pasha, Hatice Sultan offers him to forget the past and continue their married life. Refuses and divorces Hatice Sultan.
Dilsat	Güzide Arslan	19–35	Daughter of Selim Pasha and friend of Ahsen. A great fan of Theodor Herzl's writings. Steals important documents of the state for Herzl. Shot by Vladimir and dies after having surgery in hospital while confessing her betrayal to the state to her father.
Kaiser Wilhelm II	Ahmet Somers	32–38	Emperor of Germany. Allies with the Ottoman Empire and has a strong friendship with Sultan Abdulhamid II. Comes to visit Payitaht on the invitation of the Sultan.
Huseyn Pasha	Alper Duzen	32–39	Brother of Bidar Sultan. Betrays Abdülhamid II because his brother Mehmed Pasha is in exile. After his true nature is revealed, he goes into hiding, from where he is tricked and arrested by Şehzade Mehmed Abdülkadir. Tries to attack the Harem using his soldiers but fails. Is executed when found (not shown).
Vladimir	Gürkan Güzeyhuz	26–40	Parvus's man. Is very loyal to Parvus and is friends with Marco. Kills several people and takes Marco's place after he is killed. Is burned alive by Murad Efendi on Fehim Pasha's order after he tries to find Fehim Pasha for Parvus.
Fehim Pasha	Erkan Avcı	40–54	Keeps the safety of the streets of Payitaht. Has several men and works with Meyyit Efendi and Söğütlü Osman. Violent but very loyal. Has a sweet but deceiving nature. Marries İrena after Esma sends her as a spy but she joins Fehim Pasha's side. Is killed by Crowly while trying to stop the assassination attempt on the entire palace.
Mislimelek (Pakize)	Buse Varol	40–58	Pakize is an exiled Abkhazian princess along with her elder sister Efsun. Sultanzade Sabahaddin falls in love with her but her sister wants her to marry Şehzade Mehmed Abdülkadir. Eventually marries Şehzade Abdülkadir and becomes his first wife and a Sultana in the palace. Sultan Abdülhamid changes her name to Mislimelek after her marriage according to royal traditions. The marriage causes a rivalry between Abdülkadir and Sabahaddin. Accuses Handan of killing Efsun which she didn't. Divorces Abdülkadir and returns to her homeland at the start of season 3 after the death of her elder sister Efsun.
Efsun Hanim	Nur Fettahoğlu	40–54	Exiled Abkhazian Princess along with her younger sister Pakize Hanım. Falls in love with Şehzade Mehmed Selim. Dies because of falling from the stairs while trying to reveal the true identity of Handan in front of the palace.
Şehzade Mehmed Selim	Ilker Kizmaz	43–88	Son of Sultan Abdülhamid II and Bedrifelek Kadın. Very sensible and loyal to his father's ideology. Met a woman named Sureyla during his studies, and fell in love with her. After she died in an accident, he married her friend Handan. Later comes to the palace where he meets the Abkhazian princess, Efsun Hanim, and develops a soft corner for her. After her death, tries to win Zeynep Nurse, who Halil Halid also likes, and is with her when she dies. Returns to Paris after season three. His character is not much affiliated with women as much as Şehzade Mehmed Abdülkadir's is.
Handan	Emel Dede	43–63	Wife of Şehzade Mehmed Selim. Is pregnant at first, then loses her child but keeps lying to her husband about bearing the child. He divorces her when she exposes the truth. Still tries to make a soft corner for herself in his heart by a suicide attempt, even losing her vision temporarily, but they never get on together again.
Gertrude Bell	Songül Öden	42–48	A lady who travels all along the world and is in favour of civilization. She wants to make the East be like the West. She is against the Sultan as she wants to modernize the country by ending the Sultanate and also draws ties with Parvus. She is kind-hearted and does not want innocent people to die so she ends relations with Parvus. Leaves Payitaht later on in season 2.
Irena	Buket Kahraman	49–54	A lady of works at the hotel. Works for Parvus and as part of the plan makes Fehim Pahsa love her. Fehim Pasha marries Irena but she later regrets her decision. Only appears in Season 2.
Crowly	Kenneth James Dakan	49–55	Works for Parvus. Was about to kill the whole Ottoman Family but was wounded by Fehim Pasha. Escapes to Egypt and collaborates with Rothschild. Eventually killed by Halil Halid.

=== Season 3 ===
Character	Played by	Appearance in episodes	Description
Edmond Rothschild	Suavi Eren	55–89	Edmund Rothschild, born in France in 1845, is a member of the Rothschild Banking family; he is a very rich Zionist Jew. An extremely intelligent, cunning, and cold-blooded character, he is an identity that worships money and power like all Rothschilds, sees the world as his own playground, and believes that everything exists to serve him. His biggest goal is to destroy the Ottoman Empire. Is openly enemies with Sultan Abdülhamid, and he has sent many traitors into the palace. Only Appears in Season 3.
Lila Rothschild (Şivenaz)	Başak Daşman	55–88	Rothschild's daughter. Clever, cunning, and manipulative. Her biggest dream is to regain the holy lands of her belief from the Ottomans. By coming to Payitaht, she turns everything in the palace upside down. Is also Fuad Efendi's fiancée. Kills several people by poisoning them, including her own uncle. After she is exposed, she is sent to jail, where she tries to commit suicide. Later it is revealed that she is pregnant. For this, she is taken out of the jail and kept in a room, where she is facilitated. Pretends to reform and convert to Islam, but is really trying to kill Bidar Sultan. Shot and killed by Abdülkadir.
Fuad Efendi	Hakan Yufkacigil	55–81	Works with Rothschild and Şivenaz (Lila). Inherited his hate of the Sultan from his father İsmail Pasha, who was Khedive of Egypt but was one of the biggest traitors to the Ottoman Empire. His biggest purpose is to eliminate Sultan Abdülhamid and his family. Şivenaz's fiancé, although they never marry. Is shot in the neck and killed by Ahmet Celalettin Paşa while trying to escape to London.
Zeynep Nurse	Sedef Avcı	55–82	A nurse who crosses paths with Bidar Sultan. Is a traitor and works for Şivenaz. Although Mehmed Selim falls in love with her, she is in love with Halil Halid. Is shot and killed by Şivenaz's men before telling who the traitor is.
Arminius Vambery	Güven Kıraç	55–88	Sultan Abdülhamid's old friend. He is a dynamic, cunning, intelligent, and political man who knows how to act. In addition to being an international spy for Sultan Abdülhamid, Uncle Vambery is a close friend to Abdülkadir and Naime since their childhood. Though he has a strong will, he loves money and power, causing him to become a traitor and work with Fuad Efendi and Rothschild. Is sent out of Payitaht never to come back.
Halil Halid	Gurkan Uygun	55–119	He is one of the most trustworthy and efficient spies of the Sultan. He is seen carrying out missions throughout the Empire as well as behind enemy lines like in Tsarist Russia. He is known as "Dayı" or Uncle and commands a small group of men, including Söğütlü Osman, Tatar Salih, Nadir Bey, and Asaf Emre, who accompany him on different missions. Slandered and thought to be a traitor many times. Later works with Prince Ferdinand and IMRO as the Sultan sends him to spy on them. Goes to Russia between Seasons 4 and 5.
Tevfik Pasha	Tolga Öztürk	55–146	From the Crimean noble family. Sultan especially asks for Tevfik Pasha to come to the palace in season 3. Even though he is to become the Sultan if no heir remains from the Ottoman royal family, is very loyal to the state and Sultan. Has a sister named Bahar. Is in love with Fatma Sultan.
Şefik Pasha	Tolga Yeter	56–88	The Pasha who manages the security of the palace and is in charge of the Ottoman barracks. Is shot and wounded in the barracks at the end of Season 3 during the rebellion.
Tatar Salih	Erdem Ergüney	56–119	Works with Halil Halid, Asaf Emre, Nadir Bey and Sogutlu. A main member of the group. Is alongside Halil Halid for the mission in Russia in Season 3.
Garo	Volkan Uygun	56–86	A gangster who wants revenge as he thinks Halil Halid killed his brother. Throughout season 3 works with Samuel and Rothschild. Husband of Robina but Robina wants to marry Jorris so has tensions with Jorris and Robina. Killed by Tatar.
Samuel	Nebil Sayin	56–69	A gangster who works for Rothschild and is one of the main men of Rothschild. Killed by Halil Halid while trying to kill the German ambassador.
İsmail Hakkı	Necip Karakaya	56–154	A music composer and a close friend of Sultan Abdulhamid.
Kasgarli Nadir Bey	Salman Atas	64–154	Works with Halil Halid, Söğütlü Osman, Tatar Salih and Asaf Emre. He is very skilled in melee fights. Loyal to his group and the Sultan. Later works with Eşref Aziz. Nadir Bey never spoke until he met his brother Nerva in season 5.
Asaf Emre	Yusuf Eker	12–128	Works with Halil Halid, Sogutlu Osman, Tatar and Nadir bey. Good at shooting and an important part of the group. Likes singing and joking around. Makes a brief appearance in Season 1 trying to free the bank from Hiram alongside Omer.
Edward Jorris	Serdar Deniz	70–95	Comes to Payitaht with Robina and aims to conquer the city. A man of Rothschild and wants to kill him. Has a son named Sander who is killed by Garo, but he thinks the murderer is Halil Halid. Even aims to kill the Russian ambassador in order to start a war. Is arrested at the exposition while trying to steal the weapons and sent to the dungeons.
Roza	Sultan Ulutas	65–70	Adoptive daughter of Arminius Vambery and extremely loyal to her father. Vambery was constantly threatened with Roza by Shivenaz. Vambery attempted a fake assassination attempt on Roza to make Shivenaz believe she died. Leaves Payitaht secretly by the order of her father.
Robina Fain	Ece Irtem	70–95	Comes to Payitaht with Jorris; wife of Garo but cheats on him and then wants to marry Jorris in order to gain benefits. Has a newspaper company where she spread fake news against the Sultan. Also the former wife of Ziya Sami, has a daughter named Alice.
Lars	Selcuk Kilic	72–95	Man of Edward Jorris. Involved in crimes against the state. Killed by Halil Halid at the exposition.
Ahmet Celalettin Paşa	Cem Uçan	75–148	The head of spies (Serhafiye) for Sultan Abdülhamid and his childhood friend. Was underground for 10 years due to his harsh tactics, but was summoned to find the Pasha collaborating with the Young Turks. Has a reputation for being merciless and unemotional. Demoted from being Serhafiye after disobeying the Sultan's order and shooting Zülüflü İsmail Pasha. The actual Mason Pasha (Mahmud Pasha) blames him and makes it seem like he is the Mason Pasha and the traitor, almost causing the Sultan to arrest him. Joins the Young Turks and works with enemies of the state including Cassel and Karasu. Exiled to Paris after he confesses everything to the Sultan through a letter. He opposes Sultan Abdulhamid, but not the state itself.
Arif	Ekin Mert Daymaz	77–88	A journalist who works for Robina, not knowing she is a traitor. Often writes against the Sultan. Writes a report about Naime Sultan which angers her and as a result, she meets him in disguise. Falls in love with Naime Sultan not knowing her true identity. Eventually finds out her true identity but still has feelings for her. Has tensions with Abdulkadir. Refuses the marriage offer of Naime Sultan as he thinks two people from two separate worlds (a journalist and a princess) cannot be together. Leaves Payitaht at the end of Season 3.
Sander Jorris	Ege Deniz	80–86	Son of Edward Jorris. His mother was killed by Joris. An innocent kid is forced into a gang by his father. Halil Halid and his group take care of him for a while but then he is kidnapped and killed by Garo.
Omer Efendi	Batin Deniz Ucan	81–88	Sultan's spy in the UK. Steals important contents from the British Library; after that, arrives at Payitaht where the Sultan asks him to work with Halil Halid and his group. Only appears in season 3.

=== Season 4 ===
Character	Played by	Appearance in episodes	Description
Lutfullah	Cem Rohat Bozan	89	Son of Mahmud Pasha and Seniha Sultan and younger brother of Sabahaddin. Only appears in 1st episode of season four. Goes on Umrah with Seniha Sultan.
Cemile Sultan	Devrim Yakut	89–111	Sister of Sultan Abdülhamid II. Is grieving over her husband Mahmud Jelalettin Pasha, who was known to have a finger in the assassination of Sultan Abdül Aziz. They did not divorce despite his death sentence from exile. Although Jemile Sultan plans to leave after Veladet-i humayun celebrations, she decides to stay when Abdülhamid commissions Mehmed, her son, in the palace. She is authoritarian and intolerant, even causing Seniha Sultan to leave. Goes to Paris to Mehmed.
Mehmet Celalettin	Ceyhun Mengiroğlu	89–107	Son of Jemile Sultan and Mahmud Jelalettin Pasha. Smart and brave and was in love with Guljemal. Falls off his horse and leads a crippled life. Eventually ends up marrying Gulcemal. Forgives her after her truth is exposed and goes to Paris for treatment with Bahar.
Zalman David Levontin	Sermet Yeşil	89–112	He is an expert in war tactics. Had participated in all the wars of the past 30 years. His main goal is to start a big world war. With Rothschild's command, Zalman goes to Payitaht to fight as a Jewish Zionist for the first time. Hides his identity in the palace, calling himself Mr. Gustav and working as an engineer. Although he does not have many men, he has some in every vital location, although they are all exposed and arrested after he is caught. Is killed by Selim Pasha.
Zülüflü İsmail Pasha	Arif Piskin	89–125	Elder brother of Abdülhamid II. Son of Abdulmejid I from an exiled wife so is not a Şehzade and so is not an heir to the throne. First works for the Sultan as bait for the enemies, but later he is lured into believing that the Sultan had his son killed and went to the opposite side. Regrets after learning the truth. Is exiled by Ferid Pasha in season 5 after being thought to be the Mason Pasha. Takes his revenge from there.
Şehzade Ahmed Nureddin (son of Abdul Hamid II)	Alp Akar	89–119	Son of the Sultan from his wife Behice Hanım. Is very upset because of his mother's lack of attention towards him due to her illness and was an arrogant and naughty boy. However, Bidar Sultan's affection turns him into a very virtuous and well-behaved child who starts considering her as his mother.
Monica	Kader Oner	89–108	An Italian lady that Lütfullah meets while studying abroad. Wife of Lütfullah and Mahmud Pasha and Seniha Sultan's daughter-in-law. Appears with Lütfullah at the beginning of season 4. Tries to fit in and learn Ottoman traditions. A comic relief character.
Bahar	Eslia Umut	89–106	From a Crimean noble family. Sister of Tevfik Pasha. Is Mehmed's childhood friend and also has feelings for him. Envies Gülcemal due to Mehmed's love for her. Goes to Paris with Mehmed. Kills Madame Blavatsky.
Gülcemal	Gülsim Ali	89–119	Wife of Mehmed Efendi and Cemile Sultan's daughter-in-law. A hidden Christian and a traitor, works for Madam Blavatsky. However, is a good-hearted girl; confesses to Bidar Sultan and is forgiven by her and her husband. Exiled to Paris at the end of season 4.
Dilruba	Nilsu Yilmaz	89–119	She works for Madame Blavatsky. She starts to work first with Cemile Sultan and later in the harem. She wins the love of Prince Abdulkadir and wants to marry him. After her lie is revealed by the prince, the prince drives her away himself. She is killed by Madame Blavatsky.
Meziyet	Sultan Elif	90–126	A girl in the harem whose arm got burnt during the revolution while protecting important papers. Is secretly not loyal to Bidar Sultan and has a deep love for Şehzade Abdülkadir. He also develops feelings for her sensing her true love and loyalty, unlike the previous cases. They are to be married until her two roommates (Dilruba and Gulcemal) turn out to be traitors putting her on the suspect list of Bidar Sultan, who tries to prevent their marriage.
Ziya Sami	Ertuğrul Postoğlu	95–106	Brother of Khalil Khalid and former husband of Robina. Has a daughter named Alice. A traitor who disclosed state secrets and killed his own parents. Halil Halid works with him on the Sultan's orders as a spy in Russia. Bought to Payitaht by Halil Halid for public execution. Saved from his hands but is later killed by Khalil Khalid.
Ester	Makbule Meyzinoğlu	90–97	A woman who works for Zalman and Blavatsky. Enters the palace kitchen as a cook. She has a conflict with Gulcemal after Blavatsky gives control of Payitaht to Gulcemal. Killed by Zalman.
Madam Blavatsky	Kadriye Kenter	96–119	A vile woman in search of the Ark of the Covenant. Güljemal and Dilruba work for her as spies in the palace, while Anna and Beatrice are members of her society. Pretends to help Jemile Sultan find her husband, in return for her old mansion where the clues to the Ark are hidden. She learns that the Ark is under Yıldız Palace, but Hechler warns her that it's a trap set by Sultan Abdülhamid. Poisons everyone in the harem and escapes by boat.
Prince Ferdinand	Alkan Kizilirmak	96–105	Governor of Rumelia of Sultan Abdulhamid. He fears the Sultan but is against him. Prince Ferdinand wants to be the king of Bulgaria and he wants to have full control of Rumelia. That's why he secretly supports some gangsters. He is warned by Khalil Khalid, who was sent by the Sultan as a spy, and is not seen again.
Frida Karasu	Esra Isguzar	101–154	Daughter of Emanuel Karasu and student of Şhivenaz in poisons. Poisons Tahsin Pasha to weaken the Sultan. Poisons Zalman and his son, Vladimir as she thinks they weren't doing anything to save her father in jail. Poisons Mahmud Pasha which even led him near to death. The love interest of Sabahattin. Plays many games alongside her father.
William Hechler	Cem Özer	111–135	A Christian Zionist. Mourns the death of Theodor Herzl. Comes to Payitaht as the new British ambassador to the Ottoman Empire after Zalman is defeated. Openly enemies with Sultan Abdülhamid. Makes many moves against the Sultan using his spies, alongside Sabahattin, Frida, and İsmail Pasha. Is imprisoned for allegedly attempting to kill the Russian ambassador at the end of season 4. However, with the help of the traitor Pashas, Hechler is reinstated as the British ambassador in season 5. He is eventually defeated and leaves Payitaht, and the British send Cassel.
Robert	Faik Ergin	111–114	Sultan Abdulhamid's spy among the British. It is revealed later and he betrays Sultan Abdulhamid by being threatened by Mr. Hechler to kill his lover. He is asked to shoot Abdulhamid. Robert is shot by Ahmet Pasha while trying to kill Sultan Abdülhamid.
Colonel Albert Goldsmith	Burç Kümbetlioğlu	111–119	He works for Hechler. Coming to the capital with Hechler. Hechler's intelligence chief. He assassinates Sultan Abdulhamid but fails. After the 119th episode, he will not appear in the series again.
Diana	Esra Kılıç	111–119	She is Goldsmith's cousin. She works for Hechler with him. After episode 119, she doesn't appear in the series either.
Zekiye Sultan	Tuğçe Kumral	112–131	Daughter of Sultan Abdülhamid II and Bedrifelek Kadın. Wife of Ali Nureddin, son of Gazi Osman Pasha. Is called by the Sultan to take over control of the harem which is being neglected by issues of Bidar Sultan and Cemile Sultan. She is a loving girl. She even shows a positive attitude after finding out about her husband's second secret marriage. She loves her sister Naime Sultan a lot.

=== Season 5 ===
Character	Played by	Appearance in episodes	Description
Avlonyalı Ferid Pasha	Yılmaz Meydaneri / Alper Türedi	120–154	The newly appointed Sadrazam (Grand Vizier)
Kristapor Mikaelyan	Hakan Bilgin [tr]	120–148	One of the three great founders of the Armenian Revolutionary Federation. Has an interest in bombs, especially timed ones. Uncle of Ali Osman. He is killed by Eşref Aziz.
Tatavlali	Mehmet Korhan Firat	120–133	Mika's sister ex-lover and works for him. He is a member of the council of three. He is killed by Mika.
Talat Bey	Eren Dinler	120–154	Initially works at a post office. Member of the Young Turks and a great supporter of Ahmed Rıza Bey. Later, also becomes a member of the Masons after Karasu, Sabahattin, and Frida convince him to join.
Eşref Aziz	İsmail Hakkı Ürün	120–149	A good fighter. Unofficial helper of the Ottoman Empire. Was married to Mika's sister, who converted from Christianity to Islam, so Mika in revenge poisons Eşref Aziz's son, Ali Osman. Söğütlü Osman, Nadir Bey, and Asaf Emre work alongside him. He suffers a fatal gunshot.
Isaac Fernandez	Cansu Fırıncı	120–135	Fernandez is a Mason who is in cooperation with Karasu. He fights against Sultan Abdülhamid with economic and anarchic moves to take his brother's revenge. Often works with Hechler as well.
Fatma Sultan	Alara Turan	120–154	Murad V's daughter, Sultan Abdülhamid's niece, and the sister of Aliye Sultan. Initially blames her uncle for what her father has experienced and disturbs Bidar Sultan a lot in harem. However, she is not a traitor and would not betray the state, saying that it is a family issue and not a state issue. Is repeatedly accused of being a traitor by Bidar Sultan although she is not. Good with a bow and arrow.
Aliye Sultan	Goksin Sarac	120–154	Murad V's daughter, Sultan Abdülhamid's niece, and the sister of Fatma Sultan. Leaves Çırağan Palace and goes to Yıldız Palace due to lung problems. However, is actually faking her illness and wants to take down Sultan Abdülhamid in revenge for what happened to her dad. Joins an organization that is against the state and the Sultan.
Manyas Refik Bey	Ali Buhara Mete	121–147	A man who claims to be part of an organization that secretly helps the Ottoman Empire but is actually conspiring with the Masons and Young Turks. Tells İsmail Pasha that Ahmed Pasha is the Mason, although he is not, and makes the two Pashas fight with each other. Gets Ahmed Pasha to join the Young Turks since the Sultan no longer trusts him. Works for the Mason Pasha and communicates with him using a telephone.
Esad Pasha	Edip Saner	125–154	A traitor in the palace. Was promoted by Sadrazam while the Sultan was ill and joined the meetings afterwards. Works with Hechler, Karasu, and Sabahattin.
Saliha Sultan	Vildan Atasever	127–154	Sultan Abdülhamid's wife, mother of Şehzade Mehmed Abid. Comes to take care of the harem after Bidar Sultan leaves. Has good intentions but gets along poorly with Naime Sultan. Goes to the Sultan after he is exiled.
Sabuha	Goncagül Sunar	130–146	Mahmud Pasha's big sister. Is rich and frugal. Has a son named Kani.
Şehzade Ahmed Nuri	Kemal Ucar	131–154	Sultan Abdülhamid and Bedrifelek Kadın's son. A skilled spy. Infiltrates the British Embassy by gaining the trust of Manyas under the guise of Reşit Bey and subsequently the trust of Hechler. However, is later exposed and goes to the palace.
Ernest Cassel	Altan Erkekli	135–147	A famous banker. Close friend of the British King and an advisor to the Germans. Had previously worked in Egypt and established an exploitation system on behalf of his companies. Comes to Sultan trying to hurt the Ottoman Empire economically. Leaves Payitaht

== Controversy ==
According to an opinion piece from staff members of the Foundation for Defense of Democracies published on The Washington Post, the series allegedly promotes an "antidemocratic", "antisemitic" and "conspiratorial" worldview, opining that the show depicts that "a free press, secularism and democracy are the work of foreign powers, religious minorities, and godless liberals, and ultimately serve to erode national identity, honor, and security. Of all the series’ villains, none are more sinister than the Jews."

Ritman and Galuppo stated that the television series portrays Abdülhamid "as a noble leader forced to do what he must to protect the Ottoman Empire", at odds with the negative reputation with historians outside of Turkey for allowing the Hamidian massacres.

Theodor Herzl, the liberal founder of modern Zionism, is one of the villains of the series who is portrayed as a man so perfidious as to hold his penniless father prisoner without his mother's knowledge because of alleged ideological differences. The show depicts him at the First Zionist Congress, portrayed in such a way as to evoke the Elders of Zion, planning to create a Jewish state spanning from the Nile to the Euphrates, which is a popular anti-Zionism conspiracy theory. Meanwhile, the coin-flipper for the Sultan is portrayed as a secret Vatican agent allegedly working on behalf of Herzl, even though the Vatican allegedly opposed the establishment of Israel. The Washington Post noted that this portrayal was "revisionist in the extreme".

The anti-Westernism present in the show's message has also been remarked upon, as the production portrays "Jewish conspiracies" as melding together with the nefarious plots of the Catholic Church, Freemasonry, Britain as well as other Western powers, and the Young Turks into "one overarching scheme". The Vatican emissary is named "Hiram", a name that is associated with Freemasonry.

== Reception ==
=== Political endorsements in Turkey ===
The Washington Post's opinion piece noted that various actors in Turkey's political scene seemed to explicitly endorse the messages present in the show.

In Turkey, the show has met the approval of a descendant of Abdulhamid, who said "history repeats itself … these meddling foreigners now call our president a dictator, just as they used to call Abdulhamid the ‘Red Sultan’".

Turkish President Recep Tayyip Erdoğan praised the show's portrayals just two days before a referendum, saying "the same schemes are carried out today in the exact same manner... What the West does to us is the same; just the era and actors are different". Deputy Prime Minister Numan Kurtulmuş lauded the show for "shedding light" on Sultan Abdulhamid's life in "an objective manner", and gave a personal visit to the set. It is noted that Sultan Abdulhamid frequently used the same Quranic-inspired catchphrases as President Erdoğan, notably including "If they have a plan, God too has a plan!".

When discussing the series, Sultan Abdül Hamid's great-grandson and Head of the Osmanoğlu family Harun Osman said the following:

The popularity of television series about the Ottoman Empire has grown significantly in recent years in Turkey, and the Turkish government has encouraged a nostalgia for the greatness of the former empire which is sometimes referred to as 'Neo-Ottomanism'.

=== The Balkans ===
Although Turkish soap operas are wildly popular in the Balkans, Payitaht: Abdülhamid has caused some controversy in places such as Kosovo due to its message and historical revisionism.

== See also ==
- Other productions by Eastern Sunrise Films:
  - Filinta
  - The Ottoman Lieutenant
  - İsimsizler
- List of Islam-related films
- Maslaha
