= Şehzade Ahmed Nuri =

Son of Ottoman Sultan Abdul Hamid II (1878–1944)

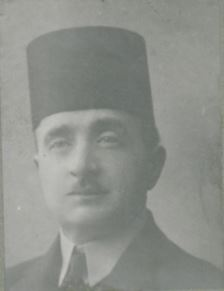
- Born: 12 February 1878; Yıldız Palace, Constantinople, Ottoman Empire (present day Istanbul, Turkey)
- Died: 7 August 1944 (aged 66); Nice, Vichy France
- Burial: Orphans Cemetery, Nice, France
- Spouse: Fahriye Hanım (m. 1900; died 1940)
Names
- Turkish: Şehzade Ahmed Nuri; Ottoman Turkish: شہزادہ احمد نوری
- Dynasty: Ottoman
- Father: Abdul Hamid II
- Mother: Bedrifelek Kadın
- Religion: Sunni Islam
- Military career
- Allegiance: Ottoman Empire
- Branch: Ottoman Army
- Service years: c. 1910–1922 (active service)
- Rank: See list

Şehzade Ahmed Nuri Efendi (Ottoman Turkish: شہزادہ احمد نوری; 12 February 1878 - 7 August 1944) was an Ottoman prince, son of Sultan Abdul Hamid II and his consort Bedrifelek Kadın.

== Early years ==
Şehzade Ahmed Nuri was born on 12 February 1878 in the Yıldız Palace. His father was Abdul Hamid II, son of Abdulmejid I and Tirimüjgan Kadın. His mother was Bedrifelek Kadın, daughter of Prince Kerzedzh Mehmed Bey. He was the third child, the second son and the youngest child of his mother. He had a brother, Şehzade Mehmed Selim, eight years older than him, and a sister, Zekiye Sultan, six years older than him.

Ahmed Nuri's circumcision took place in 1891, together with his half-brothers, Şehzade Mehmed Abdülkadir, and Şehzade Mehmed Burhaneddin. His early education took place in the princes school. He was then enrolled in the Ottoman Military College. He held the rank of Major of Cavalry Regiment in the Imperial Ottoman Army. He was then promoted to Colonel, and later to brigadier. He was allocated a villa on the grounds of the Yıldız Palace.

He was a very clever, sensitive person, and for this reason, he always suffered misfortune. He had an extraordinary talent for painting. He had taken lessons from the Italian painter Salvatore Valery, who also taught at the Sanâyi-i Nefise Mektebi. He used to paint colored pictures on glass. In 1901, after working for days, he made a portable bathhouse the size of a small tent for his father as a gift for the 25th anniversary of his accession to the throne.

On 27 April 1909, Abdul Hamid II was deposed, and sent into exile in Thessaloniki. Nuri, however, remained in Istanbul. Abdul Hamid's whole family was expelled from Yıldız Palace, and most of them didn't even have a place to live in. Nuri and his elder brother, Şehzade Selim, initially settled in the mansion of their sister Zekiye Sultan, until Nuri was allocated a mansion in Büyükdere Avenue.

== Personal life ==
His only wife was Fahriye Zişan Hanım. She was born in 1883. Her father was Ilyas Ali Bey, a Circassian, and also a Cavalry Regiment Major in the Imperial Ottoman Army. They married in 1900. The two of them met when the prince visited the school for girls named Mekteb-i Tahsil, located in Şehzadebaşı, whose director was her elder brother. She was beautiful. Moreover, her family had been friends with the prince's mother.

Sultan Abdul Hamid loved his daughter-in-law. He also rewarded her with a gold medal after she took care of her husband following a surgery for hernia in 1905. The hernia was a result of a package that was thrown into the sultan's car during a Friday procession. Nuri thought it to be a bomb, and jumped out of the car. However, it was later revealed that the package was an orphaned baby. However, with the severity of the jump, Nuri had a hernia. Although he had surgery, he suffered this disease until his death.

The couple didn't have children. The prince loved her very much, and didn't marry another woman. They separated in 1919, because Fahriye had been anguished over an act of the prince. She left their villa in Büyükdere, and settled in a mansion in Feneryolu, and took her elder sister along. Upon the exile of the imperial family in 1924, she followed her husband to Nice, France. She died in 1940, and was buried in the cemetery of the Sulaymaniyya Takiyya, Damascus, Syria.

== Life in exile and death ==
At the exile of the imperial family in March 1924, Nuri and his wife settled in Nice, France. On 14 January 1925, he gave the power of attorney to Sami Günzberg, a well-known Turkish Jewish lawyer, authorising him to regain from usurpers buildings, lands, mines, concessions left by Abdul Hamid situated in Turkish territory and elsewhere. In exile, the prince fell into financial troubles. His villa in Yıldız was seized, and the money from the villa in Feneryolu quickly ran out. A young Greek man, whom he had met in Nice and was on good terms with, helped the prince by giving him a certain amount of money.

Nuri had been proficient in chemistry as well as painting and architecture. He used to sell toiletries such as soap, which he produced in his home or hotel room in Nice. He also gave them as gifts to his friends. During World War II, his situation got worse. Unable to find a job, Nuri fell into a miserable situation. He died of starvation and disease in a park on 7 August 1944. He was buried in an orphans cemetery. A letter found in his pocket read, "If I die, do not blame anyone because I am starving. I was making a living by playing piano in a movie theater. Now I can not find this job. You bury me as a Muslim."

== Honours ==
Styles of Şehzade Ahmed Nuri
- Reference style: His Imperial Highness
- Spoken style: Your Imperial Highness

- Order of the House of Osman, Jeweled
- Order of Glory, Jeweled
- Order of Distinction, Jeweled
- Order of Osmanieh, Jeweled
- Order of the Medjidie, Jeweled
- Imtiyaz Medal in Silver
- Imtiyaz Medal in Gold
- Liakat War Medal in Gold
- Liakat Medal in Gold
- Hicaz Demiryolu Medal in Gold
- Imtiyaz War Medal in Gold
- Iftikhar Sanayi Medal in Gold
- Greek War Medal in Gold

=== Military appointments ===
Military ranks and army appointments

- Major of the Cavalry Regiment, Ottoman Army
- Colonel of the Cavalry Regiment, Ottoman Army
- Brigradier of the Cavalry Regiment, Ottoman Army

== In popular culture ==
- In the 2017 TV series Payitaht: Abdülhamid, Şehzade Ahmed Nuri is portrayed by Turkish actor Kemal Uçar.

== Sources ==
- Osmanoğlu, Ayşe (2000). Babam Sultan Abdülhamid. Mona Kitap Yayinlari. ISBN 978-6-050-81202-2.
