= Nemika Sultan =

Ottoman princess (1888–1969)

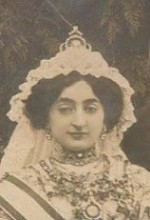
- Born: 9 March 1888; Yıldız Palace, Constantinople, Ottoman Empire (now Istanbul, Turkey)
- Died: 6 September 1969 (aged 81); Bostancı, Istanbul, Turkey
- Burial: Şehzade Ahmed Kemaleddin Mausoleum, Yahya Efendi Cemetery, Istanbul
- Spouse: Ali Kenan Bey (m. 1911; died 1962)
- Issue: Fatma Fethiye Hanımsultan; Sultanzade Ibrahim Bey; Sultanzade Kazim Bey; Emine Satia Hanımsultan
Names
- Turkish: Emine Nemika Sultan; Ottoman Turkish: امینه نميقه سلطان
- Dynasty: Ottoman
- Father: Şehzade Mehmed Selim
- Mother: Iryale Hanım
- Religion: Sunni Islam

Emine Nemika Sultan (Ottoman Turkish: امینه نميقه سلطان; 9 March 1888 – 6 September 1969) was an Ottoman princess, the daughter of Şehzade Mehmed Selim, son of Sultan Abdul Hamid II.

== Early life ==
Nemika Sultan was born on 9 March 1888 in the Yıldız Palace. Her father was Şehzade Mehmed Selim, and her mother was Iryale Hanım, the daughter of Hassan Ali Marshan and Fatma Horecan Aredba. Her mother was the sister of Nazikeda Kadın, the first wife of Sultan Mehmed VI. She was the second child and only daughter of her parents. She had an elder brother Şehzade Mehmed who died young and a paternal younger half-brother, Şehzade Mehmed Abdülkerim. She was the granddaughter of Sultan Abdul Hamid II and Bedrifelek Kadın and the eldest grandchild of Abdul Hamid to survive infancy.

In March 1898, she attended the wedding of her aunt Naime Sultan, daughter of Abdul Hamid II and Bidar Kadın, and Mehmed Kemaleddin Pasha, son of Gazi Osman Pasha. During the ceremonial occasion, she sat with her aunts Şadiye Sultan and Hamide Ayşe Sultan.

Nemika's mother died in 1904, when she was sixteen years old.

== Marriage ==
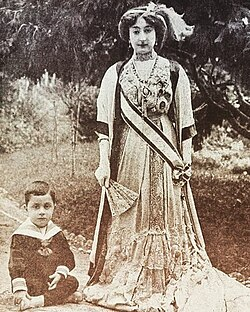
Nemika Sultan with her half-brother Şehzade Mehmed Abdülkerim

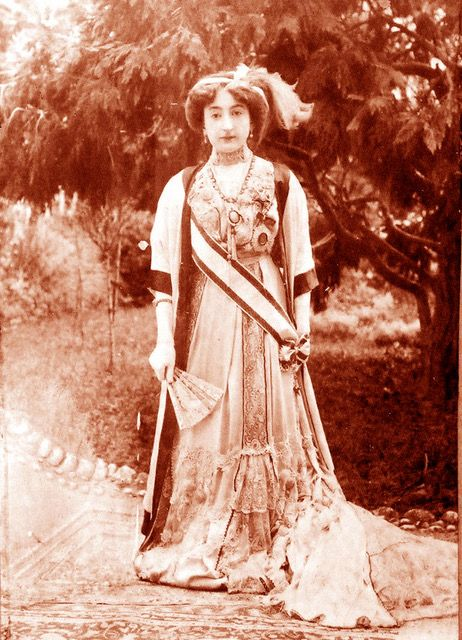
Nemika Sultan (doctored photo); her brother has been etched out, leaving a faint outline at the bottom left corner of the picture

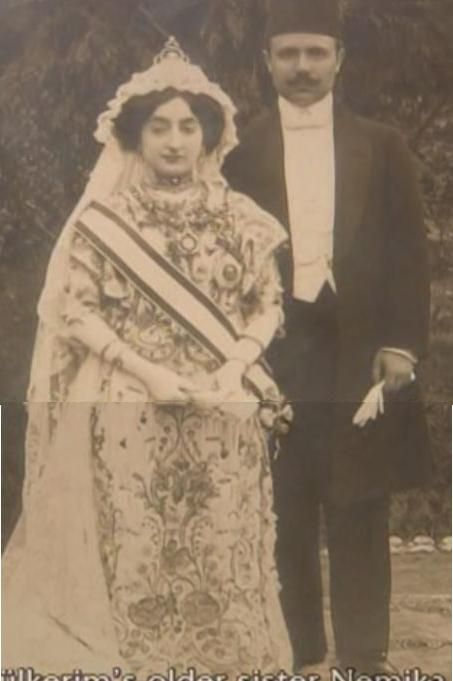
Nemika Sultan with her husband

Nemika Sultan married Ali Kenan Isin Bey on 22 June 1911 in the Yıldız Palace. The couple was given Göztepe Palace as their residence. She gave birth to the couple's first child, a daughter, Fatma Fethiye Hanımsultan on 13 November 1912. Three years later, on 14 September 1915, she gave birth to her second child, a son, Sultanzade Ibrahim in the Göztepe Palace. Four years later, on 1 March 1920, she gave birth to her third child, a son, Sultanzade Kazim in the Göztepe Palace. Her husband was Turkey's first mining engineer to study abroad.

Upon the exile of the imperial family in March 1924, Nemika and her family settled in Paris, France, where she gave birth to her fourth and last child, a daughter named Emine Satia Hanımsultan on 15 January 1927. They later moved to Tripoli, Lebanon, where her husband, Ali Kenan served as the mayor. She was widowed at Ali Kenan's death in 1962.

== Death ==
In 1952, the exile for princesses was revoked and Nemika returned to Turkey after being widowed, and settled in Bostancı district in Istanbul. She died on 6 September 1969 at the age of eighty-one, and was buried in the mausoleum of Şehzade Ahmed Kemaleddin, located in Yahya Efendi Cemetery, Istanbul.

== Honours ==
- Order of the House of Osman
- Order of the Medjidie, Jeweled
- Order of Charity, 1st Class

== Issue ==
Name	Birth	Death	Notes
By Ali Kenan Isin Bey (married 22 June 1911; 1 November 1882 – 4 April 1961)
Fatma Fethiye Hanımsultan	13 November 1912	20 April 1998	Born in Göztepe Palace; Married and had issue; Died in Beirut, Lebanon, and buried there;
Sultanzade Ibrahim Bey	14 September 1915	21 June 1969	Born in Göztepe Palace; Married and had issue; Died in Beirut, Lebanon, and buried there;
Sultanzade Kazim Bey	1 March 1920	15 May 2003	Born in Göztepe Palace; Married and had issue; Died in Beirut, Lebanon, and buried there;
Emine Satia Hanımsultan	15 January 1927	6 June 2003	Born in Paris, France; Married without issue; Died in Istanbul, Turkey, and buried there;

== Ancestry ==
Ancestors of Nemika Sultan

8. Abdulmejid I
4. Abdul Hamid II
9. Tirimüjgan Kadın
2. Şehzade Mehmed Selim
10. Prince Mehmed Bey Kerzedzh
5. Bedrifelek Kadın
11. Princess Faruhan Hanım İnal-lpa
1. Emine Nemika Sultan
12. Prince Ismail Marshania
6. Prince Ali Hasan Bey Marshania
3. Iryale Hanım
7. Princess Fatma Horecan Aredba

== Sources ==
- Brookes, Douglas Scott (2010). The Concubine, the Princess, and the Teacher: Voices from the Ottoman Harem. University of Texas Press. ISBN 978-0-292-78335-5.
