= Şehzade Mehmed Selim =

Ottoman prince, son of Sultan Abdul Hamid II

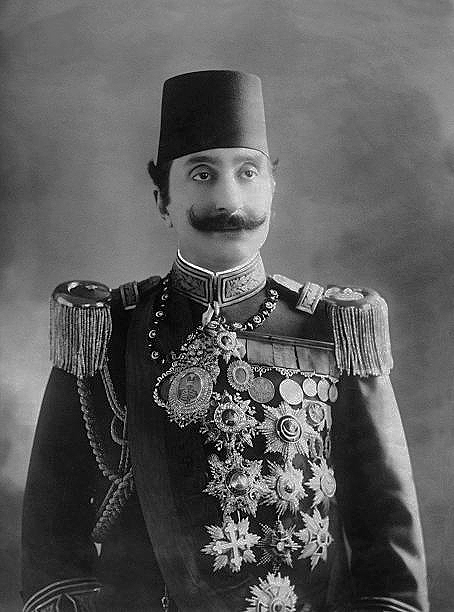
- Portrait of Şehzade Mehmed Selim in ceremonial uniform
- Born: 11 January 1870; Dolmabahçe Palace, Istanbul, Ottoman Empire
- Died: 5 May 1937 (aged 67); Jounieh, French Lebanon
- Burial: Cemetery of the Sulaymaniyya Takiyya, Damascus, Syria
- Spouse: Iryale Hanım (m. 1886; died 1904) Pervin Hanım (unknown): Eflakyar Hanım; Nilüfer Hanım (m. 1905; div. 1924): Dürrüyekta Hanım; Dilistan Hanım (m. 1918) Gülnaz Hanım (unknown): Mevhibe Hanım
- Issue: Şehzade Mehmed; Nemika Sultan; Şehzade Mehmed Abdülkerim
- Dynasty: Ottoman
- Father: Abdul Hamid II
- Mother: Bedrifelek Kadın
- Religion: Sunni Islam
- Military career
- Allegiance: Ottoman Empire
- Branch: Ottoman Army
- Rank: See list

Şehzade Mehmed Selim Efendi (Ottoman Turkish: شہزادہ محمد سلیم; 11 January 1870 – 5 May 1937) was an Ottoman prince, the eldest son of Sultan Abdul Hamid II and his consort Bedrifelek Kadın.

== Early life ==
Şehzade Mehmed Selim was born on 11 January 1870 in the Dolmabahçe Palace. His father was Sultan Abdul Hamid II, son of Sultan Abdulmejid I and Tirimüjgan Kadın. His mother was Bedrifelek Kadın, daughter of Prince Kerzedzh Mehmed Bey. He was the eldest son, and second child born to his father, and the eldest child of his mother. He had a sister, Zekiye Sultan, two years younger than him, and a brother Şehzade Ahmed Nuri, eight years younger than him.

In 1877, Selim and other members of the imperial family settled in the Yıldız Palace, after Abdul Hamid moved there on 7 April 1877. His circumcision took place on 17 December 1883, together with Şehzade Mehmed Ziyaeddin, eldest son of Sultan Mehmed V, Şehzade Ibrahim Tevfik, grandson of Sultan Abdulmejid I, and Abdulmejid II, Şehzade Mehmed Şevket and Şehzade Mehmed Seyfeddin, sons of Sultan Abdulaziz. Halil Bey Efendi carried out Selim's circumcision.

Abdülhamid and Mehmed Selim had a turbulent relationship. They did not like each other and notoriously disagreed. This also damaged Abdülhamid's relationship with Bedrifelek and her other children, because, in order not to see Mehmed Selim, he avoided visiting them in their rooms.

Selim's early education took place in the Prince's School, Yıldız Palace, together with his younger half-brother, Şehzade Mehmed Abdülkadir, and Sultan Abdulaziz's son Abdulmejid. His tutor was Baha Efendi. Ahmed Mazharüddin taught him Persian, and Mehmed Nuri taught him French. After graduating from the Prince's School, he was enrolled in the Ottoman Military College. He held the rank of Brigradier of the infantry regiment in the Imperial Ottoman Army, and was later promoted to the rank of General. He had been allocated a villa on the grounds of the Yıldız Palace.

== Personal life ==
Selim's first wife was Iryale Hanım. She was born in 1870 in Sukhumi. Her real name was Daryal Marshania. She was the daughter of Prince Ali Hasan Bey Marshania and Princess Fatma Horecan Aredba. Her elder sister, Nazikeda Kadın, was married to Sultan Mehmed VI. She was taken up for service in the Yıldız Palace in 1882, and married Selim in 1886. She was the mother of Şehzade Mehmed, born in 1887, and Emine Nemika Sultan, born in 1888. She died in 1904, and was buried in Yahya Efendi Cemetery.

His second wife was Pervin Hanım. She died in Jounieh, Lebanon. His third wife was Eflakyar Hanım. She was born in Batumi. Her father was Gazi Muhammed Bey. A painter by avocation, she died in Jounieh, Lebanon. His fourth wife was Nilüfer Hanım, an Abkhazian. They married in 1905. She was the mother of Şehzade Mehmed Abdülkerim, born in 1906. After the two divorced in 1924, she married another man. She died in 1957, and was buried in Yahya Efendi Cemetery.

Another of his wives was Dürrüyekta Hanım. She was a Circassian from the Karzeg family, and had been formerly a hazinedar in the imperial harem. She was buried in Tripoli. Another wife was Leman Dilistan Hanım. She was born in Sivas. Her father was Osman Bey. They married on 16 September 1918. She died on 1 February 1951 in Beirut, Lebanon. Some other wives were Gülnaz Hanım, a Circassian, and Mevhibe Hanım.

== Abdul Hamid's deposition and later life ==
On 27 April 1909, Abdul Hamid II was deposed, and sent into exile in Thessaloniki. Selim, however, remained in Istanbul. Initially, Mehmed Selim was chosen as successor, but this would have required an amendment to the law of succession and for this, along with political reasons, he was discarded in favor of Mehmed V, the younger half-brother of Abdülhamid II. Abdul Hamid's whole family was expelled from Yıldız Palace, and most of them didn't even have a place to live in. Selim, and his younger brother, Şehzade Ahmed, initially settled in the mansion of their sister Zekiye Sultan, until Selim was allocated a mansion in Serencebey. According to Halid Ziya Uşaklıgil, whom he met in 1909, after Sultan Mehmed V's accession to the throne, Selim was a short man, tense, and worn out before his time. He had a nervous trembling that gripped his face and entire body, a trait in common with Şehzade Yusuf Izzeddin.

After Thessaloniki fell to Greece in 1912, Abdul Hamid returned to Istanbul, and settled in the Beylerbeyi Palace. In February 1918, Selim's uncle, Sultan Mehmed learnt that there was no hope for Sultan Abdul Hamid and sent a message to Selim, saying that their father had a fatal disease, and to see him immediately. However, when Selim, and his brother Şehzade Ahmed came, their father ordered them to wait for a while. He gave out his last breath at the moment that he invited Selim inside. Neither Selim nor the other princes and princesses saw his last moment. With Abdülhamid there were his two favorite consorts, Müşfika Kadın and Saliha Naciye Kadın.

After Mehmed's death in July 1918, his younger brother Sultan Mehmed VI, ascended the throne, and Selim became second in line to the throne. In 1919, rumors were circulating that a plot was afoot for the removal or assassination of Sultan Mehmed, and replacing him with Selim himself.

== Life in exile ==
At the exile of the imperial family in March 1924, Selim and his family first settled in Damascus, then under French rule, and later in Jounieh, Lebanon. He used to spend his summers in Aley. On 14 January 1925, he gave the power of attorney to Sami Günzberg, a well-known Turkish Jewish lawyer, authorising him to regain from usurpers buildings, lands, mines, concessions left by Abdul Hamid situated in Turkish territory and elsewhere.

Into the mid-1920s, the idea to overthrow the Kemalist regime, and reverse the abolition of the Ottoman Caliphate, still found Turkish and Kurdish supporters. By then, they agreed on Selim, as their choice for a future caliph. By the supporters of Sheikh Sa'ad rebellion in 1925, Selim was proclaimed caliph, and the Friday sermon in the Great Mosque of Diyarbakir was read in his name. France prevented the rebellion from spreading to Syria, where Selim was very popular. However, the prince had nothing to do with the event. He was highly respected in Syria and was referred to by the people as Sultan Selim. The house where he stayed was called Kasrü'l-Melik (House of the Ruler). When he ran out of money, the Armenian, who owned the house, allowed him to live for years without paying rent.

In 1930, princes descended from Sultan Abdul Hamid undertook initiative and approached the British Petroleum Company (BP) to obtain a share of the oil recovered from the Mosul wells registered in the name of Abdul Hamid and filed lawsuits one after another to reclaim ownership of some land in Palestine that had belonged to the sultan. This was led by Selim. But Abdulmejid II had made similar contacts and eventually this dual approach led to disagreement between the two of them. Former French president Alexandre Millerand represented him in court to regain his confiscated properties.

In 1934, his heirs approached the Land Court in Jaffa, requesting the court to order the rectification of the new register on the ground that their rights to the land in question had been omitted in the register. The heirs produced an old, pre-1908 title deed to the property in the name of their father. At the time, Selim was resident in Syria.

== Death ==
Mehmed Selim died at the age of sixty-seven on 5 May 1937 in Jounieh, Greater Lebanon, and was buried in the cemetery of the Sulaymaniyya Takiyya, Damascus, Syria.

== Honours ==
Styles of Şehzade Mehmed Selim
- Reference style: His Imperial Highness
- Spoken style: Your Imperial Highness

Ottoman honours

- Order of the House of Osman, Jeweled
- Order of Glory, Jeweled
- Order of Distinction, Jeweled
- Order of Osmanieh, Jeweled
- Order of the Medjidie, Jeweled
- Imtiyaz Medal in Silver
- Imtiyaz Medal in Gold
- Liakat War Medal in Gold
- Liakat Medal in Gold
- Hicaz Demiryolu Medal in Gold
- Greek War Medal in Gold
- Outstanding Navy Medal in Gold

Foreign honours

- Austria-Hungary: Grand-Cross of the Order of Leopold, 6 June 1918

=== Military appointments ===
Military ranks and army appointments

- Brigadier of the Infantry Regiment, Ottoman Army
- General of the Infantry Regiment, Ottoman Army

== Issue ==
Name	Birth	Death	Notes
By Iryale Hanım (married 1886; 1870 – 1904)
Şehzade Mehmed	1887	1890	born and died in Yıldız Palace; buried in Yahya Efendi Cemetery
Emine Nemika Sultan	9 March 1888	6 September 1969	married once and had issue, two sons and two daughters
By Nilüfer Hanım (married 1905; died 1957)
Şehzade Mehmed Abdülkerim	26 June 1906	3 August 1935	married once and had issue, two sons

== In popular culture ==
- In the 2017 TV series Payitaht: Abdülhamid, Şehzade Mehmed Selim is portrayed by Turkish actor İlker Kızmaz.

== Ancestry ==
Ancestors of Şehzade Mehmed Selim

8. Mahmud II
4. Abdulmejid I
9. Bezmiâlem Sultan
2. Abdul Hamid II
5. Tirimüjgan Kadın
1. Şehzade Mehmed Selim
6. Prince Kerzedzh Mehmed Bey
3. Bedrifelek Kadın

== Sources ==
- Kark, Ruth; Frantzman, Seth J. (2010). "One of the most Spectacular Lawsuits Ever Launched": Abdülhamid's Heirs, his Lands and the Land Case in Palestine, 1908-1950". New Perspectives on Turkey. 42: 127–157. doi:10.1017/S0896634600005604. ISSN 0896-6346. S2CID 152210297.
- Osmanoğlu, Ayşe (2000). Babam Sultan Abdülhamid. Mona Kitap Yayinlari. ISBN 978-6-050-81202-2.
- Uçan, Lâle (2019). Son Halife Abdülmecid Efendi'nin Hayatı - Şehzâlik, Veliahtlık ve Halifelik Yılları (PDF) (PhD Thesis). Istanbul University Institute of Social Sciences.
- Yanatma, Servet (2007). The Deaths and Funeral Ceremonies of Ottoman Sultans (From Sultan Mahmud II to Sultan Mehmed VI Vahideddin) (PDF) (Master Thesis). Boğazici University.
