= Zekiye Sultan =

Ottoman princess, daughter of Abdul Hamid II (1872–1950)

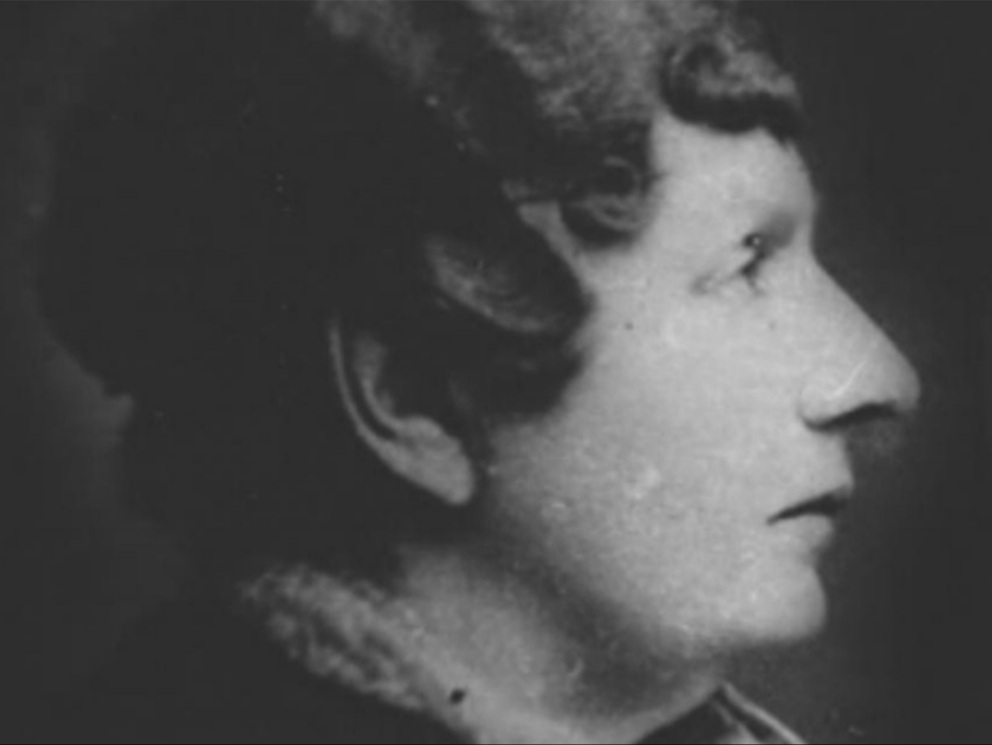
- Born: 12 January 1872; Dolmabahçe Palace, Istanbul, Ottoman Empire (now Istanbul, Turkey)
- Died: 13 July 1950 (aged 78); Pau, Pyrénées-Atlantiques, France
- Burial: Pau, Pyrénées-Atlantiques, France
- Spouse: Damat Ali Nureddin Pasha (m. 1889)
- Issue: Ulviye Şükriye Hanımsultan; Fatma Aliye Hanımsultan
Names
- Turkish: Zekiye Sultan; Ottoman Turkish: زکیه سلطان
- Dynasty: Ottoman
- Father: Abdul Hamid II
- Mother: Bedrifelek Kadın
- Religion: Sunni Islam

Zekiye Sultan (Ottoman Turkish: زکیه سلطان; 12 January 1872 – 13 July 1950) was an Ottoman princess, the daughter of Sultan Abdul Hamid II and Bedrifelek Kadın.

== Early life and education ==
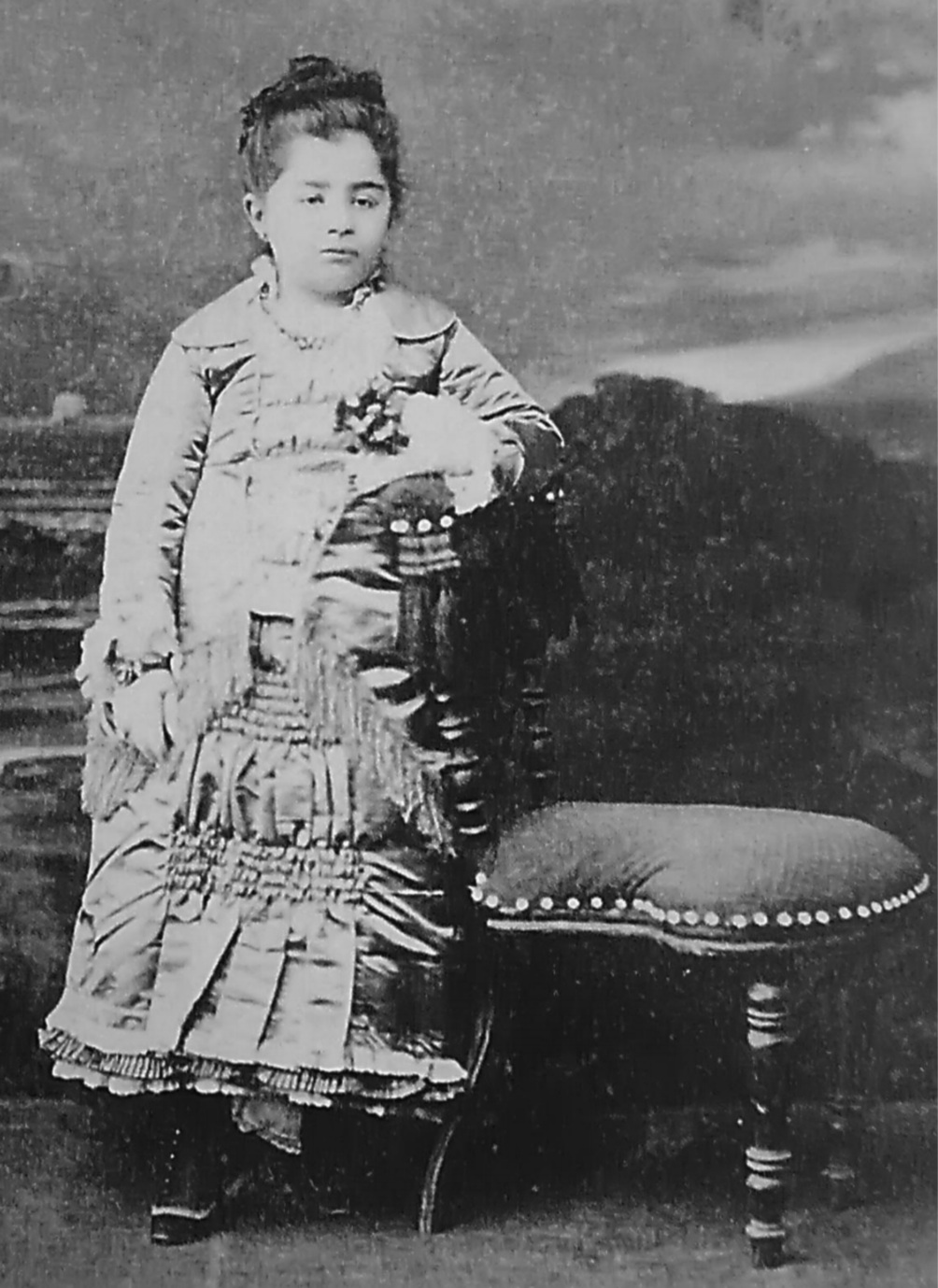
Zekiye Sultan in 1879, aged seven

Zekiye Sultan was born on 12 January 1872 in the Dolmabahçe Palace. Her father was Abdul Hamid II, son of Abdulmejid I and Tirimüjgan Kadın. Her mother was Bedrifelek Kadın, daughter of Prince Mehmed Karzeg. She was the third child, and second daughter of her father and the second child of her mother. She had two brothers, Şehzade Mehmed Selim, two years older than her, and Şehzade Ahmed Nuri, six years younger than her. She was one of Abdul Hamid's favorite daughters, with Naime Sultan and Ayşe Sultan. She was described as her father's great joy following the death of her older half-sister Ulviye Sultan. Abdul Hamid was devoted to her and would fulfil all her wishes.

After Abdul Hamid's accession to the throne on 31 August 1876, the imperial family remained in the Dolmabahçe Palace. In 1877, Zekiye and other members of the imperial family settled in the Yıldız Palace, after Abdul Hamid moved there on 7 April 1877.

Zekiye began her education in 1879, age seven, at the Ihlamur Pavilion together with her brother Şehzade Mehmed Selim, and Sultan Abdulaziz's children, Şehzade Mehmed Şevket, Esma Sultan and Şehzade Mehmed Seyfeddin. She studied geography, the Quran, and Turkish. She also read English and French books. She was also taught music, first by Lombardi Bey, and following her marriage by Madame Avisnad Bavis, a French woman. She learnt both Turkish and European music. She was also taught to play the piano.

== Marriage ==
In 1887, Zekiye was engaged to Ali Nureddin Pasha, the eldest son of Gazi Osman Pasha and Zatıgül Hanım, a lady formerly in the harem of Sultan Abdulaziz, In 1889, aged seventeen, her father arranged her trousseaux and marriage together with three of Sultan Abdulaziz's daughters, princesses Saliha Sultan, Nazime Sultan, and Esma Sultan. The marriage contract was signed on 15 March 1889 in the Yıldız Palace. Zekiye's deputy was Mehmed Yavar Agha, and witness was Mehmed Cevher Agha. Ali Nureddin's deputy was Grand Vizier Mehmed Kamil Pasha. The wedding took place 20 April 1889 in the Yıldız Palace.

Ottoman princesses were traditionally allocated palaces on their marriage. She was allocated the Ortaköy Palace. This palace once belonged to her aunt Mediha Sultan, half-sister of her father, where she resided with her first husband. Zekiye moved to Ortaköy Palace, on the second day after the marriage, where 80 men and 80 women were in their service. In 1898, Ali Nureddin's younger brother, Mehmed Kemaleddin Pasha, married her younger half-sister Naime Sultan. Her palace was constructed next to Zekiye's, and the two buildings used to be called "The Twin Mansions".

The two together had two daughters, Ulviye Şükriye Hanımsultan born in 1890, who died at the age of about three on 23 February 1893, and Fatma Aliye Hanımsultan, born in 1891. Fatma Aliye married Mehmed Muhsin Yeğen, member of the Egyptian Yeğen family, in 1911. The couple had two sons, Osman Hayder Bey, born on 5 September 1912, and Salih Zeki Bey, born on 4 September 1921.

Zekiye Sultan and Ali Nureddin Pasha had a great esteem for music. She used to play piano at her mansion. She was interested in arts and also promoted them. During the month of Ramadan, she fed the poor and provided financial aid to them. She also presented gifts to the guests who came to the Iftar. She participated in various donation campaigns, that made her known as a compassionate and benevolent princess. She also rewarded her household staff with extra bonuses during the times of festivals.

Zekiye was also close to Emina Ilhamy, the wife of Tewfik Pasha, Khedive of Egypt, and Walida Pasha to her son Abbas II of Egypt. She visited her twice a year in Cairo by her father's permission and was treated with great pomp, and Emine would also visit Zekiye in her palace for Iftar banquets. Due to her closeness with Zekiye, Emina was privileged enough to have dinner with the Sultan, and becoming the few guests to have dinner with the Sultan. Zekiye also served as the mediator between her father and Emina, when the latter had any request for the Sultan.

Rumours had it that Nureddin Paşa had met a beautiful Greek Ottoman woman outside Bon Marché in Beyoğlu and that she later became his mistress. The rumours reached Abdul Hamid II, who urged Zekiye Sultan to divorce her husband but she refused. Apparently, after a while, the Greek Ottoman woman was killed by the Sultan's men.

== Exile ==
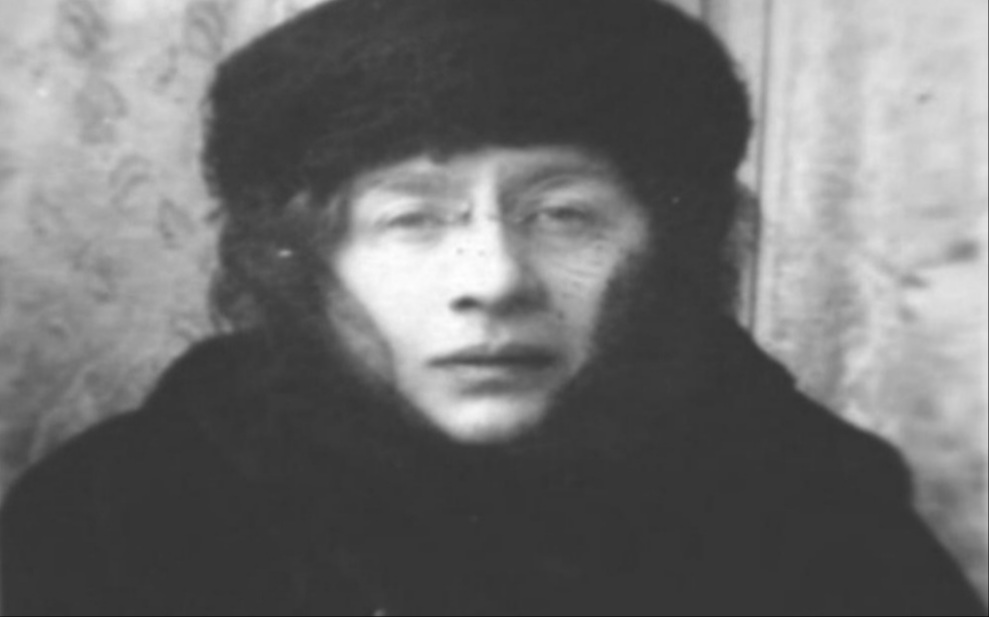
Zekiye Sultan in old age

At the exile of the imperial family in March 1924, Zekiye and her family including her husband, daughter, and grandsons first settled in Nice, France travelling through train from Sofia via Vienna. In Nice, she frequently would hire taxis to travel around the city with her servants and grandchildren. Even in exile, her compassion and generosity continued as she continued to buy gifts for friends and acquaintances.

In Nice, she kept in contact with her half-sister Refia Sultan. Her grandson Osman was engaged to Refia's daughter Ayşe Hamide Hanımsultan, however Hamide died in 1929 following an incident.

In 1932, they became relatively poor, and they settled in Pau, Pyrénées-Atlantiques, where cost of living was much cheaper compared to Nice. In Pau, the whole family lived in one room in a hotel, which they never paid for because the Pasha had been the son of Gazi Osman Paşa. Her mother chose to remain in Turkey, in her mansion in Serencebey, where she died in 1930.

According to Neslişah Sultan, she was chubby and had lost most of her hair, and scarcely left the house. She would dress up and wear a blonde wig. She used to collect miniature animals, goats, and flowers, and also ate a lot of sweets.

== Death ==
Zekiye Sultan died on 13 July 1950 in Pau, Pyrénées-Atlantiques, France at the age of seventy-eight, and was buried there. However, before her death, she had willed to be buried in a Muslim country but her embalmed body remained in a basement of a church for several years. Her daughter, Fatma Aliye had devoted all her capacities to facilitate her burial in a Muslim country but she never succeeded, and therefore Zekiye lies in an unmarked grave in Pau. Her husband outlived her by two years, dying in 1952.

== Personality ==
Zekiye was described as religious, dignified, compassionate and eloquent. She and her husband were philanthropic, and in Ramadan, they would host around one hundred and fifty people in their palace, moreover she is said to have distributed gifts and cash which exceeded 2500 gold coins. Şehzade Ali Vâsib described her as very refined and elegant princess, that possessed the qualities that could refer to her as the queen of princesses. Her younger half-sister, Ayşe Sultan called her an embodiment of patience and endurance, who faced the hardships of the exile and referred to that as her own misfortune.

== Honours ==
Styles of Zekiye Sultan
- Reference style: Her Imperial Highness
- Spoken style: Your Imperial Highness

- Order of the House of Osman
- Order of the Medjidie, Jeweled
- Order of Charity, 1st Class

== Issue ==
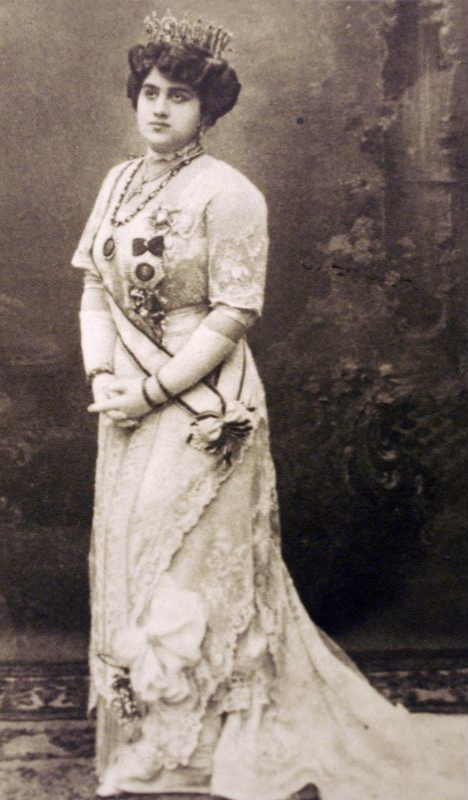
Fatma Aliye Hanimsultan, Zekiye's daughter

By her husband, Zekiye Sultan had two daughters:

- Ulviye Şükriye Hanımsultan (c. 1890 – 23 February 1893). Born and died in the Ortaköy Palace, buried in Yahya Efendi cemetery.
- Fatma Aliye Hanımsultan (c. 1891 – 14 April 1972). Born in the Ortaköy Palace. In 1911 she married Mehmed Muhsin Bey Yeğen, from the powerful Yeğen Egyptian family. They had two sons:
  - Osman Hayder Bey Yeğen (5 September 1912 – c. 1988), married and without issue.
  - Salih Zeki Bey Yeğen (4 September 1921 – 5 November 1994), married and had a daughter and a son:
    - Fatma Yasemin Yeğen (b. 18 September 1973)
    - Muhsin Osman Yeğen (b. 14 December 1977)

== In popular culture ==
- In the 2017 TV series Payitaht: Abdülhamid, Zekiye Sultan is portrayed by Turkish actress Tuğçe Kumral.

== Sources ==
- Brookes, Douglas Scott (2010). The Concubine, the Princess, and the Teacher: Voices from the Ottoman Harem. University of Texas Press. ISBN 978-0-292-78335-5.
- Sakaoğlu, Necdet (2008). Bu mülkün kadın sultanları: Vâlide sultanlar, hâtunlar, hasekiler, kadınefendiler, sultanefendiler. Oğlak Yayıncılık. ISBN 978-9-753-29623-6.
- Uluçay, Mustafa Çağatay (2011). Padişahların kadınları ve kızları. Ankara: Ötüken. ISBN 978-9-754-37840-5.
- Uru, Cevriye (2010). Sultan II. Abdülhamid'in kızı Zekiye Sultan'in Hayatı (1872-1950) (Master Thesis) (in Turkish). Marmara University Institute of Social Sciences. Archived from the original on 2022-01-17.
