= Neslişah Sultan =

Neslişah Sultan may refer to:

- Neslişah Sultan (daughter of Şehzade Ömer Faruk) (1921–2012), Ottoman princess, Egyptian princess consort
- Neslişah Sultan (daughter of Şehzade Abdülkadir) (1925–2014), Ottoman princess
