= Kirsan =

Kirsan or Kırşan may refer to:

== Astronomy ==
- 5570 Kirsan, a main-belt asteroid named after Kirsan Ilyumzhinov

== People ==
- Alp Kırşan (born 1979), Turkish actor
- Kirsan Ilyumzhinov (born 1962), Russian politician and chess grandmaster
- Leya Kırşan (born 2008), Turkish actress
