= Şehzade Mehmed Abdülkerim =

Ottoman prince (1906–1935)

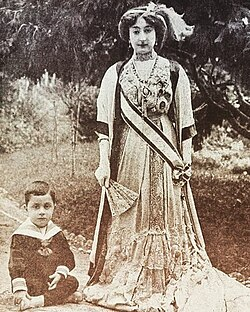
- Şehzade Mehmed Abdülkerim in childhood with his half-sister, Nemika Sultan
- Born: 26 June 1906; Yıldız Palace, Istanbul, Ottoman Empire (present day Istanbul, Turkey)
- Died: 3 August 1935 (aged 29); New York City, New York County, New York, United States
- Burial: Mount Olivet Cemetery, Maspeth, Queens County, New York
- Spouse: Nimet Hanım (m. 1930)
- Issue: Dündar Ali Osman; Harun Osman
- House: Ottoman
- Father: Şehzade Mehmed Selim
- Mother: Nilüfer Hanım
- Religion: Sunni Islam

Şehzade Mehmed Abdülkerim Efendi (Ottoman Turkish: شهزادہ محمد عبدالکریم, also Mehmed Abdülkerim Osmanoğlu; 26 June 1906 – 3 August 1935) was an Ottoman prince, the son of Şehzade Mehmed Selim and Nilüfer Hanım. He was the grandson of Abdul Hamid II and Bedrifelek Kadın. In the last few years of his life he was endorsed by the Japanese, who counted on his prestige as an Ottoman prince, to instigate a rebellion by local Turkic Muslims in East Turkestan against the Chinese government. After the failure of the uprising and being abandoned by his Japanese sponsors, Abdülkerim went into exile in the United States, and committed suicide in New York in 1935.

== Early life ==
Şehzade Mehmed Abdülkerim was born on 26 June 1906 in the Yıldız Palace. His father was Şehzade Mehmed Selim, son of Abdul Hamid II and Bedrifelek Kadın, and his mother was Selim's fourth consort Nilüfer Hanım, an Abkhazian. He was educated at the Galatasaray College, Istanbul.

Upon the exile of the imperial family in March 1924, Abdülkerim and his family first settled in Damascus, Syria, then under French rule, and then in Jounieh, Lebanon. On that occasion, his mother was divorced by his father and chose to stay in Istanbul, where she remarried.

== Personal life ==
Abdülkerim's only wife was Nimet Hanım. She was born in Beirut, which was then in the Ottoman Empire, in 1911. She was of Lebanese Maronite descent. They married in 1930 in Beirut, and she converted to Islam after her marriage. Failing to receive his father's approval for the marriage, the couple settled in Damascus, Syria. The two together had two sons, Şehzade Dündar Ali Osman Osmanoğlu (born 1930) and Şehzade Harun Osmanoğlu (born 1932). In later years, she settled in Istanbul with her son Harun, where she died on 4 August 1981.

== Descendants ==
Şehzade Harun Osman Osmanoğlu had three children; two sons and one daughter who were;

Şehzade Orhan Osmanoğlu (born 25 August 1963) he married Nuran Yıldız Hanımefendi on 22 December 1985 and had five children with her, two sons and three daughters, while he married Esra Gürkan and had one daughter, his children were;

• Nilhan Osmanoğlu Sultan (born 25 May 1987, Turkey), she has two children, Hanzade Vatansever Hanımsultan (born 1 July 2013) and Sultanzade Mehmed Vahideddin Vatansever (born 10 September 2014), she married Damat Mehmed Behlül Vatansever.

• Şehzade Yavuz Selim Osmanoğlu (born 22 February 1989, Turkey), he has one child, Şehzade Mehmed Selimhan Osmanoğlu (born 2024), he married Damla Işık Osmanoğlu Hanımefendi.

• Şehzade Mehmed Süleyman Osmanoğlu (born 6 November 1989, Turkey), he has one child, Dilara Ayşe Osmanoğlu Sultan (also called Aaliyah, born 22 June 2014), he married Meryem Osmanoğlu Hanımefendi.

• Nilüfer Osmanoğlu Sultan (born 5 May 1995)

• Berna Osmanoğlu Sultan (born 1 October 1998)

• Asyahan Osmanoğlu Sultan (born 12 January 2004)

Nurhan Osmanoğlu Sultan (born 20 November 1973 in Damascus) daughter of Harun;

• Sultanzade Mohammad Halil (born 27 August 2002)

• Saara Osmanoğlu Sultan (born 11 November 2004)

Şehzade Abdülhamid Kayıhan Osmanoğlu (born 4 August 1979) youngest son of Harun

• Şehzade Muhammed Harun Osmanoğlu (born 30 November 2007)

• Şehzade Muhammed Abdülaziz Osmanoğlu (born 10 August 2016)

== Later life and death ==
In 1932 he left Damascus, Syria, to become active in the independence movements of Uyghurs in China's Xinjiang, also called East Turkestan at the time. In 1933, he was invited to Japan by their government, presumably with an eye towards leveraging his status as the Ottoman pretender to aid the Japanese Empire in outreach to Central Asian Muslims in conflict with the Soviet Union.

Abdülkerim first went to Tokyo, but after he could not find the support he expected, he moved to East Turkestan to organize the people against Chinese rule. Upon the defeat of his weak forces, Abdülkerim first fled to India, and later sought asylum in the United States. Near the end of his life he was almost penniless. Spurned by a wealthy married woman with whom he had hoped to reverse his fortunes, Şehzade Abdülkerim Efendi died by his own hands in a $3 New York hotel room on 3 August 1935, with only 75 cents found in his effects.

Declassified OSS documents (the predecessor of the CIA) and contemporary press reports consistently state that he shot himself, although his grandson Abdülhamid Kayıhan Osmanoğlu (born 1979) alleged in a 2014 interview with Milat that Abdülkerim was assassinated by Chinese agents. Abdülhamid Kayıhan did not however provide any evidence for this claim. Abdülkerim had left a suicide note, written in Ottoman Turkish and addressed to New York City Police Commissioner Lewis Joseph Valentine, stating among others that he intended to kill himself because he was ill and had failed in his efforts to marry a local woman of means. He also left a final message to the woman in question, a Ms Alice de Stefano of 1050 Stebbins Avenue, the Bronx.

Şehzade Mehmed Abdülkerim is buried in Mount Olivet Cemetery, Maspeth, Queens County, New York. Initial plans for his remains to be laid to rest in Beirut, where his immediate family resided, did not materialise.
