= Halid =

Halid is both a given name and a surname. Notable people with the name include:

- Halid Bešlić (1953–2025), Bosnian folk singer and musician
- Halid Beg Cibran (1882–1925), Kurdish soldier
- Halid Djankpata (born 2005), Togolese footballer
- Halid Genjac (born 1958), Bosnian politician
- Halil Hâlid (1869–1931), Turkish writer
- Halid Lwaliwa (born 1996), Ugandan footballer
- Halid Muslimović (born 1961), Bosnian singer
- Emin Halid Onat (1908–1961), Turkish architect
- Halid Šabanović (born 1999), Bosnian footballer
- Halid Ziya Uşaklıgil (1866–1945), Turkish author
- Nurdin Halid (born 1958), Indonesian businessman
