= Neslişah Sultan (daughter of Şehzade Abdülkadir) =

Ottoman princess

- Born: 25 December 1925; Budapest, Hungary
- Died: 30 May 2014 (aged 88); Istanbul, Turkey
- Burial: Karacaahmet Cemetery, Istanbul, Turkey
- Spouse: Damat Avni Reda Bey (m. 1953; div. 1969) Damat Mehmed Şefik Ziya (died 1980)
- Issue: Sultanzade Salih Reda Bey; Sultanzade Ömer Reda Bey
Names
- Safvet Neslişah Sultan
- Dynasty: Ottoman
- Father: Şehzade Mehmed Abdülkadir
- Mother: Meziyet Hanım
- Religion: Sunni Islam

Safvet Neslişah Sultan (Ottoman Turkish: نسل شاہ سلطان; December 1925 – 30 May 2014), also known as Küçük Neslişah Sultan, was an Ottoman princess, the daughter of Şehzade Mehmed Abdülkadir, son of Sultan Abdul Hamid II.

== Early life ==
Neslişah Sultan was born on 25 December 1925 in Budapest, Hungary, three years after the dissolution of Ottoman Empire. Having been born after the exile of the dynasty, she never carried the title of Sultana by full right. Her father was Şehzade Mehmed Abdülkadir, son of Abdul Hamid II and Bidar Kadın. Her mother was Fatma Meziyet Hanım, daughter of Mecid Bey, a colonel of the Ottoman Army. She was the seventh and last child and second daughter of her father, and the second child of her mother. She had a full sister Bidar Sultan, one year elder than her.

In 1940, her family moved to Sofia, Bulgaria due to the ongoing World War II, and Neslişah lived in Nice, Vichy France, and in Paris, occupied France, with her aunt Ayşe Sultan.

== Marriages ==
Neslişah Sultan moved to Cairo, Egypt, where she married Avni Reda Bey in 1953. He became a Damat. The couple's first child, a son, Sultanzade Salih Reda Bey, was born in 1954, followed by a second son Sultanzade Ömer Reda Bey, born in 1957/1959, both born in Cairo. The couple later moved to Istanbul, where they divorced in 1969. She then married Mehmed Şefik Ziya (born 1894), an American citizen of Turkish Cypriot ethnicity, and widower of Şükriye Sultan, daughter of Crown Prince Şehzade Yusuf Izzeddin. She was widowed at his death in 1980.

== Later life and death ==
On 2 April 2000, she attended the funeral of Mihrimah Sultan, daughter of Şehzade Mehmed Ziyaeddin. On 2 April 2012, she and her sons attended the funeral of Neslişah Sultan, daughter of Şehzade Ömer Faruk and Sabiha Sultan.

Neslişah Sultan died on 30 May 2014, at the age of eighty-eight at Marmara Training and Research Hospital, Istanbul. She was the last surviving child of Şehzade Mehmed Abdülkadir, and the last surviving grandchild of Abdul Hamid. Her funeral was attended by her relatives and members of Ottoman dynasty. She was buried in Karacaahmet Cemetery, alongside her mother Fatma Meziyet Hanım.

== Issue ==
Together with Anvi Reda Bey, Neslişah had two sons:

- Sultanzade Salih Reda Bey (born 1954, Cairo);
- Sultanzade Ömer Reda Bey (born 1957/1959, Cairo), married on 27 July 1995 in Swiss Hotel, Istanbul, to Ceylan Fethiye Reda (née Palay, born 1971), and has issue, two daughters:
  - Meziyet Dilara Reda (born 1998)
  - Neslişah Reda (born 2000)
