= Franz von Werner =

Austrian writer and diplomat

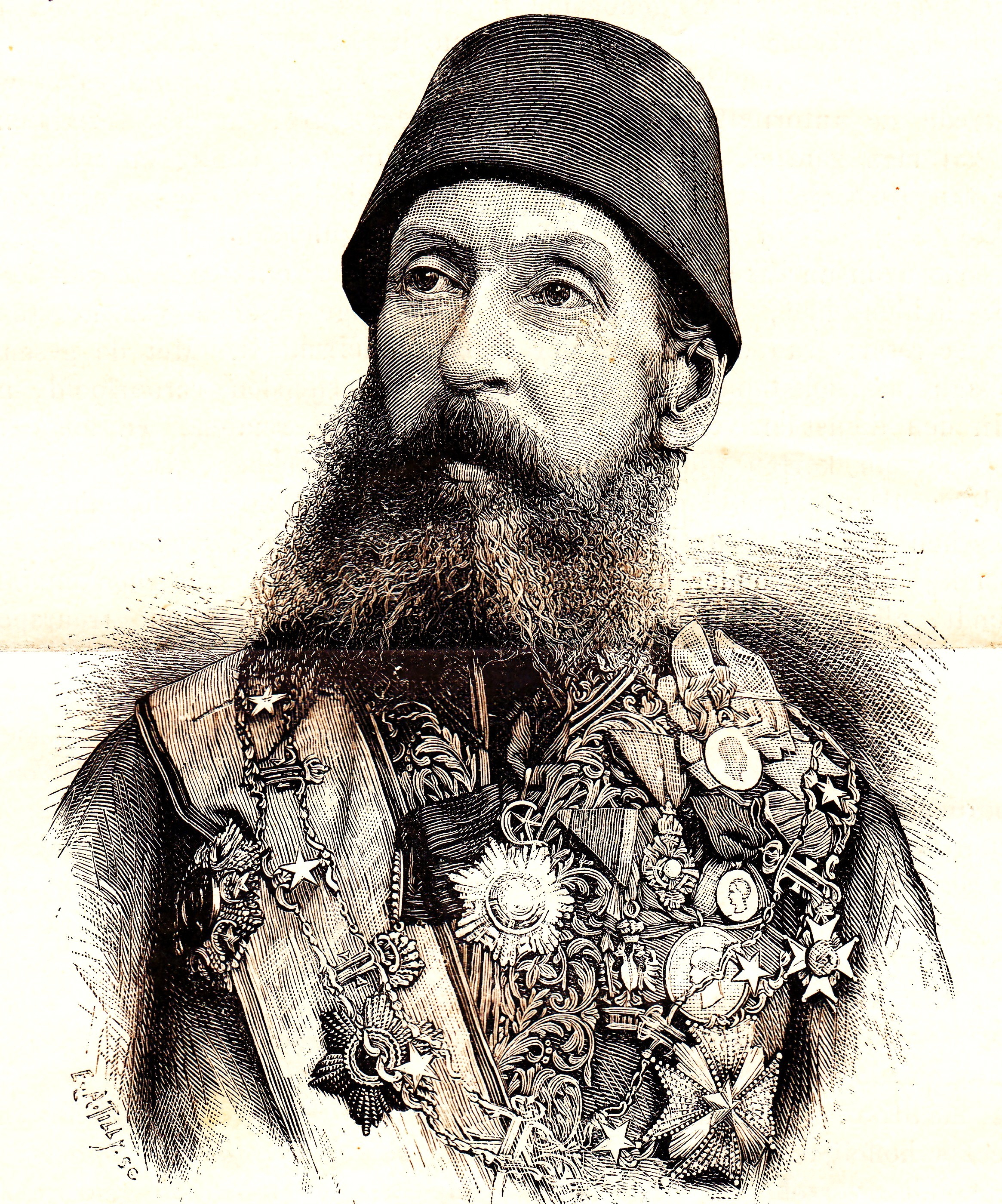
Photo of Franz von Werner

Franz Xaver Karl Georg Arthur von Werner, better known by his pseudonym and Muslim name Murad Effendi, (Vienna, 30 May 1836 – The Hague, 12 September 1881) was a writer, Austrian nobleman and later diplomat in the service of Ottoman Empire.

== Early life ==
He was the son of Franz von Werner, a Croatian landowner of Austro-German origin, and his wife, Eleonore Pfeiffer. After completing high school he joined an Austrian cavalry regiment. During the Russo-Turkish Crimean War he became an officer in the Turkish Army, converting to Islam.

== Career ==
In 1856, after the third Peace of Paris, Werner entered politics. As a secretary with special powers he was dispatched on an extraordinary mission for the Affairs of Montenegro and Herzegovina and was later personal secretary of Grand Vizier Mehmed Emin Âli Pasha. In 1859 he undertook a special mission to Bucharest, and in 1860 to Palermo. In 1864 he was the Turkish Consul for the Banat headquartered in Temesvár (Timișoara).

During his stay in Timișoara, he returned to the poetic literary aspirations of his early youth. Besides the poetry collections "Sounds from the East" and "Through Thuringia" he now wrote tragedies which achieved some success on the German stage, and comedies, which were far more popular. Von Werner presented his experiences and insights on the political and social conditions of the Ottoman Empire in his "Turkish Sketches".

In 1872 he was consul general in Venice, in 1874 Consul General in Dresden, in 1877 Minister Resident at the Courts of The Hague and Stockholm and in 1880 he became the envoy extraordinary and Minister in those courts.

== Personal life ==
In 1867 he married Henriette Christine Ebell. In the same year their son Franz Karl Vincenz Gaston von Werner Murad Bey was born in Temesvár.

He died at The Hague in 1881.

== Issue ==
He had a son from his marriage to Henriette Christine Ebell (1840–1887/1910), Franz Karl Vincenz Gaston Murad Bey (1867–1936), a high-ranking Ottoman official, who married in 1900 Gabriele Sophia Wilhelmine Emma Maria von Michalkowski (Schloss Littentschitz, 4 May 1877 – 1963), daughter of Eduard von Michalkowski (Stendal, 1836 – Krems, 1930) and his wife (m. 28 October 1873) Baroness Gabriele Wilhelmine Johanna Adelheid Beata von Podstatzky-Prussinowitz und Thonsern (10 May 1848 – Krems, 18 February 1913), and had issue, being the great-grandfather of Philomena de Tornos y Steinhart, wife of Prince Jean, Duke of Vendôme, head of the House of Orléans and claimant to the defunct throne of France. He died in 1936.

== Works ==
- Klänge aus Osten. (Sounds from the East). (Temesvar 1865)
- Durch Thüringen. (Through Thuringia). (1870)
- Marino Falieri. (tragedy). (Leipzig 1871)
- Selim III. (tragedy). (1872)
- Ines de Castro. (tragedy) (1872).
- Mirabeau. (tragedy) (1875).
- Bogadil. (comedy) (1874)
- Mit dem Strom.(With the Power) (comedy) (1874)
- Professors Brautfahrt. (comedy) (1874)
- Ein Roman.(A Novel) (comedy) (1875)
- Durch die Vase. (The Vase) (comedy) (1875).
- Türkische Skizzen. (Turkish Sketches) (Leipzig 1878) (2 volumes.)
- Ost und West. (East and West) (poems). (Oldenburg 1881)
- Nassreddin Chodja, ein osmanischer Eulenspiegel (Nassreddin Chodja, an Ottoman Eulenspiegel) (1880)
- Balladen und Bilder (Ballads and Images) (1885)
- Dramatische Werke. (Plays)(Leipzig 1881) (3 volumes.)
