= Leya Kırşan =

Turkish actress (born 2008)

- Born: 23 May 2008 (age 18); Istanbul, Turkey
- Occupation: Actress
- Years active: 2014–present

Leya Kırşan (born 23 May 2008) is a Turkish actress. She is known for her roles in the TV series Payitaht: Abdülhamid and Kuruluş: Osman.

== Life and career ==
Leya Kırşan started to act in TV series by portraying the character of Ecem in the TV series Hayat Yolunda, published in 2014. In 2015, she played the role of Maral Erdem in the TV series Maral:En Güzel Öyküm, as a child of Maral Erdem in the TV series Eve Return released in 2015, as the character of Elif, in the TV series Adı Legend, in 2017, as Zeynep Aksoy. She played the character named Şadiye Sultan in the TV series Payitaht: Abdülhamid, which started broadcasting in 2017. She played the lead character Elif in the TV series Tozkoparan, Tozkoparan İskender,Tozkoparan İskender: Shadow and Tozkoparan İskender: Kaos.

== Filmography ==
Television
Year	Production	Role	Notes	Channel
2014–2015	Hayat Yolunda	Ecem	Supporting role	Kanal D
2015	Maral: En Güzel Hikayem	Maral Erdem (childhood)	Supporting role	TV8
2015–2016	Eve Dönüş	Elif	Supporting role	ATV
2017	Adı Efsane	Zeynep Aksoy	Supporting role	Kanal D
2017–2018	Payitaht Abdülhamid	Şadiye Sultan	Supporting role	TRT 1
2018–2020	Tozkoparan	Elif	Leading role	TRT 1
2021–2022	Tozkoparan İskender	Elif	Leading role	TRT 1
2023–2025	Kuruluş: Osman	Fatima Hatun	Supporting role	ATV
2026	Sevdam Karadeniz	Üzüm Alazlı	Supporting role	NOW
Internet
Year	Production	Role	Notes	Platform
2023	Tozkoparan İskender: Gölge	Elif	Leading role	tabii
2026	Tozkoparan İskender:Kaos	Elif	Leading role	tabii
Cinema
Year	Production	Role	Notes	
2022	Bir Türk Masalı		Supporting role	
2026	Deniz Kızı Marmara	Marmara	Supporting role	
