= Halil Hâlid =

Turkish writer, diplomat, academic, politician (1869 – 1931)

Halil Hâlid (1869 – 1931) was a Turkish writer, diplomat, academic and a member of the Ottoman Parliament. He was a teacher at the University of Cambridge in the United Kingdom and the University of Istanbul in Turkey.

== Early life and education ==
Halil Hâlid was born in 1869 in Ankara into a religious family in a village near the coast of the Black Sea. He attended high school in Ankara and then moved to Istanbul where he studied for while in a Medrese beside the Beyazit Mosque. He then studied law at the Darülfünun (which would become the Istanbul University). He graduated in 1893. Not satisfied with the political climate in the Ottoman Empire he moved to the United Kingdom in 1894. Without a passport he managed to get on a steamer heading to Hull in the UK. He then was compelled by the Ottoman Ambassador in London to return to Istanbul to gain a document demonstrating he did not have some legal issue back in the Ottoman Empire. He shortly returned travelling with stops in Paris and Budapest but was not successful. In November 1894 he fled once again, this time on an oil steamer to Liverpool.

== In exile ==
The first years he wrote for newspapers articles on the political situation in the Ottoman Empire before in 1897 he was appointed the Vice-Consul of the Ottoman Embassy in London. He became a lecturer for Turkish language at the Cambridge University in 1902. He was also a Turkish teacher for the Board of Indian Civil Service Studies between 1902 and 1906 and for the Foreign Service School between 1906 and 1911. Following the Young Turk revolution of 1908, he visited Istanbul for several times and began to write for the Servet-i Fünun around 1909. He resigned from his office at the Cambridge University in 1911 and returned to Istanbul in 1912. He had stayed for more than ten years in England.

=== Journeys ===
In 1904 he travelled to Algeria, then a French colony to take part in the Congress of the Orientalists on behalf of the University of Cambridge. His stay in inspired him for his book Cezayir Hatiratindan (Reminiscences to Algeria). While in Algeria, he visited the cities Philippeville and Constantine and observed how the French governed over the oppressed Muslims and that the names of the localities on his journey towards Constantine were exclusively in French and not in the Arab language. He also questioned that the head of the Medrese in Constantine was a French official and not an Arab, as he had met several Arabs who had a fair command in Arab and Islamic studies. He also visited Egypt and Sudan before he returned to his duties at the University of Cambridge in February 1905.

== Return to the Ottoman Empire ==
Returning to Istanbul, he kept on writing for the magazine Servet-i Fünun of Ahmet Ihsan. His articles for the magazine were influiential as it introduced the term "boycott" to Turkish politics. He was elected to the Ottoman Parliament in 1912 for Ankara and was involved in the discussions in passing the primary education law. In 1913 he resigned from parliament.

=== Diplomatie career ===
In 1913 he was nominated the Consul General at the Ottoman representation in Bombay, India.

== In Germany ==
In 1915 he settled to Berlin, where he penned articles for German newspapers on Ottoman and Muslim culture and for Ottoman newspapers he was a reporter from Berlin. In 1918 he published the book Baz-i Berlin Makalati (Some articles from Berlin) in which he wrote on his experiences he made during World War I in Berlin. He was impressed by the German women's life during the war who had organized in voluntary work. The women services included providing the civil population in lessons in cooking, agriculture, mathematics and painting. The meal kitchen at the Alexanderplatz where 7000 people were served in turns, left a deep impression on him. Further he reported on the State Print which had an independent administration and not only private customers but also the state had to pay for the publications ordered.

=== Journey to Bern ===
He attended the Socialist International in Bern in 1919 where he presented the British delegation an exemplar of the A Study in English Turcophobia.

== In the Turkish Republic ==
In 1922 he became a lecturer in the Faculty of Literature Darülfünün and later also its Faculty of Theology. He was a lecturer for eight years. He died in late March 1931 and was buried at the Merkezefendi cemetery in Istanbul.

== Works ==
- 1904, London; Diary of a Turk
- 1905, London; A Study in English Turcophobia
- 1906, Cezayir Hatiratindan (Reminiscences to Algeria)
- 1907, London; The Crescent versus the Cross
- 1912, Berlin; Panislamische Gefahr
- 1918, Berlin; Bazı Berlin Makālâtı
- 1919, A Study in English Turcophobia
- 1925, Türk Hakimiyeti ve Ingiliz Cihangirligi
