= Iftikhar Sanayi Medal =

Medal granted by the Ottoman Empire

The Iftikhar Sanayi Medal was a medal of the Ottoman Empire. It was first granted by Sultan Abdulhamid II. The medal features the emblem on the front side and on the obverse side has two branches leaving a blank space for the awardee's name to be engraved. The medal is made of gold or silver.

The Sanayi Medal Ribbon bar
