= Bedrifelek Kadın =

Consort of Abdul Hamid II (1851–1930)

Baş Kadın of the Ottoman Empire (Chief Consort)
- Tenure: 11 April 1895 - 27 April 1909
- Predecessor: Nazikeda Kadın
- Successor: Kamures Kadın
- Born: 4 January 1851; Anapa, Circassia, Russian Empire
- Died: 8 February 1930 (aged 79); Serencebey Mansion, Istanbul, Turkey
- Burial: Yahya Efendi cemetery, Istanbul
- Spouse: Abdul Hamid II (m. 1868; died 1918)
- Issue: Şehzade Mehmed Selim; Zekiye Sultan; Şehzade Ahmed Nuri
- Turkish: Bedrifelek Kadın; Ottoman Turkish: بدرے فلك قادین
- House: Kerzedzh (by birth); Ottoman (by marriage)
- Father: Prince Mehmed Bey Kerzedzh
- Mother: Princess Faruhan Hanım İnal-lpa
- Religion: Sunni Islam

Bedrifelek Kadın (Ottoman Turkish: بدرے فلك قادین, "moon of the sky"; 4 January 1851 – 8 February 1930) was the third consort of Sultan Abdul Hamid II of the Ottoman Empire.

== Early life ==
Bedrifelek Kadın was born on 4 January 1851 in Anapa. She was a member of Circassian family, the House of Kerzedzh (Adyghe: Къэрзэдж). Her father was Prince Mehmed Bey Kerzedzh and her mother the Abkhazian Princess Faruhan Hanım İnal-lpa. She had a younger sister, Dilber Hanım, and three paternal younger half-sisters, Şazıdil Hanim, Nevrestan Hanim, and Melekistan Hanım. When Russia invaded the Caucasus and exterminated the Circassians, she managed to escape to Istanbul, where she entered the Ottoman court. Able to contact her family, her sister Dilber Hanım and her mother came to stay with her. Her mother died shortly after and her father remarried with her half-sisters' mother. She was described as blonde, with blue eyes and a fair complexion.

== Marriage ==
Bedrifelek received a good education and married Abdul Hamid on 15 November 1868 in the Dolmabahçe Palace. A year after the marriage, on 11 January 1870, she gave birth to the couple's first child, a son, Şehzade Mehmed Selim, followed two years later by a daughter, Zekiye Sultan, born on 21 January 1872.

After Abdul Hamid's accession to the throne on 31 August 1876, she was given the title of the "Third Kadın". In 1877, Bedrifelek and other members of the imperial family settled in the Yıldız Palace, after Abdul Hamid moved there on 7 April 1877. Here on 12 February 1878, she gave birth to the couple's third child, a son, Şehzade Ahmed Nuri. At one point, however, she also suffered at least one miscarriage. In 1879 Abdülhamid divorced his Second Consort Nurefsun Kadın and Bedrifelek became Second Consort.

Abdülhamid did not get along with Mehmed Selim and this damaged his relationship with Bedrifelek, because in order not to see his son he stopped visiting her and in public he treated her coldly. However, he respected her. Bedrifelek was known as a kind, thoughtful, smiling woman and got along well with all other consorts.

On 16 September 1895, after the death of Abdul Hamid's first consort, Nazikeda Kadın, Bedrifelek was installed the first consort and chief consort with the title of "BaşKadin". After Rahime Perestu Sultan's death, adoptive mother and Valide Sultan, in 1906, she became the principal lady in the imperial harem.

On 27 April 1909, Abdul Hamid was deposed, and sent into exile in Thessaloniki. Bedrifelek didn't followed him, and so remained in Istanbul. Following the 31 March Incident, there was the concrete possibility for Bedrifelek to become Valide Sultan because her son Mehmed Selim had been chosen as his father’s successor. In the end this did not happen and Abdülhamid II's half-brother Mehmed V became Sultan, and maybe for this reason she did not follow Abdülhamid to Thessaloniki. Abdul Hamid's whole family was expelled from Yıldız Palace, and most of them didn't even have a place to live in. Bedrifelek, and her sons, Selim, and Ahmed, initially settled in her daughter, Zekiye Sultan's mansion in Tarlabaşı, before she settled with her son Selim, in his mansion located in Serencebey.

After Thessaloniki fell to Greece in 1912, Abdul Hamid returned to Istanbul, and settled in the Beylerbeyi Palace, where he died in 1918.

== Sponsorings ==
In 1900, Bedrifelek sponsored the construction of a fountain known as the "Körük Fountain" in Gebze. In 1909, she sponsored the repairing of the tekke and tomb of Nûreddin Cerrâhi in Karagümrük, Istanbul. She also made donations to the "Ottoman Hilal-i Ahmer Association" (Hilâl-i Ahmer Cemiyet).

== Last years and death ==
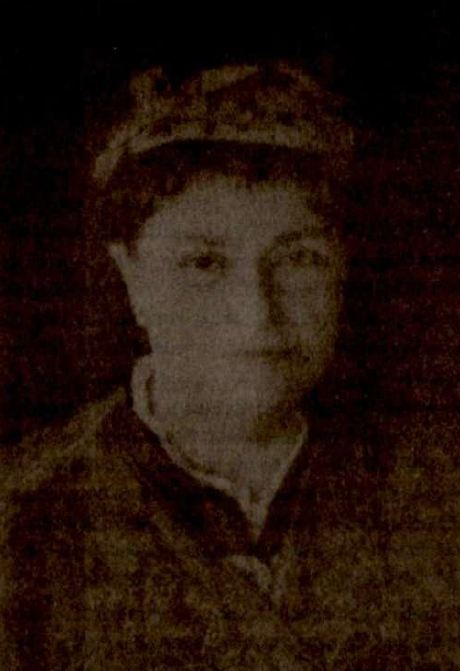

At the exile of the imperial family in March 1924, Bedrifelek remained in her son's mansion in Serencebey. Those who knew her said she would never get out of her house and she would always reminisce about her time in Yıldız Palace. She always wore white clothes and a white veil to cover her head and her eyes would always be wet and mournful. She was always melancholic and always spoke nostalgically of the old days when she was Imperial Consort. On 14 January 1925, she gave the power of attorney to Sami Günzberg, a well-known Turkish Jewish lawyer, authorising him to regain from usurpers buildings, lands, mines, concessions left by Abdul Hamid situated in Turkish territory and elsewhere. She died on 8 February 1930 at the age of seventy-nine, and was buried in Yahya Efendi cemetery, Istanbul.

== Issue ==
Name	Birth	Death	Notes
Şehzade Mehmed Selim	11 January 1870	5 May 1937	had eight consorts, and had issue, two sons and one daughter
Zekiye Sultan	21 January 1872	13 July 1950	married once, and had issue, two daughters
Şehzade Ahmed Nuri	12 February 1878	7 August 1944	married once, without issue

== See also ==
- Kadın (title)
- Ottoman Imperial Harem
- List of consorts of the Ottoman sultans

== Sources ==
- Akyıldız, Ali (2018-03-15). "Son Dönem Osmanlı Padişahlarının Nikâh Meselesi". DSpace@29 Mayıs.
- Brookes, Douglas Scott (2010). The Concubine, the Princess, and the Teacher: Voices from the Ottoman Harem. University of Texas Press. ISBN 978-0-292-78335-5.
- Sakaoğlu, Necdet (2008). Bu Mülkün Kadın Sultanları: Vâlide Sultanlar, Hâtunlar, Hasekiler, Kandınefendiler, Sultanefendiler. Oğlak Yayıncılık. ISBN 978-6-051-71079-2.
- Osmanoğlu, Ayşe (2000). Babam Sultan Abdülhamid. Mona Kitap Yayinlari. ISBN 978-6-050-81202-2.
- Uluçay, Mustafa Çağatay (2011). Padişahların kadınları ve kızları. Ötüken. ISBN 978-9-754-37840-5.
