= Tirimüjgan Kadın =

Consort of Ottoman Sultan Abdulmejid I

- Born: 16 October 1819; Circassia, Russian Empire
- Died: 3 October 1852 (aged 32); Beylerbeyi Palace, Constantinople, Ottoman Empire (now Istanbul, Turkey)
- Burial: New Ladies Mausoleum, New Mosque, Istanbul
- Consort: Abdulmejid I (m. 1840)
- Issue: Naime Sultan; Abdul Hamid II; Şehzade Mehmed Abid
Names
- Turkish: Tirimüjgan Kadın; Ottoman Turkish: تیر مژکان قادین
- House: Ottoman (by marriage)
- Father: Bekhan Bey
- Mother: Almaş Hanım
- Religion: Sunni Islam

Gülnihal Tirimüjgan Kadın (16 October 1819 – 3 October 1852; Ottoman Turkish: تیرمژکان قادین) was a consort of Sultan Abdulmejid I, and the mother of Sultan Abdul Hamid II of the Ottoman Empire.

== Early life ==
Tirimüjgan was of Shapsug Circassian ancestry. Her father was named Bekhan Bey and her mother Almaş Hanım. In her memoirs, her granddaughter Ayşe Sultan says that, despite her well-documented origins, Abdul Hamid's enemies falsely claimed that she was the daughter of an Armenian musician named Çandır.

According to Charles White, who visited Istanbul in 1843, Tirimüjgan was brought to Istanbul by Rıza Pasha, and given to Esma Sultan, who educated her, named her Gülnihal, and then presented her to Abdulmejid. She probably worked as a palace servant before becoming a consort. After their wedding, Abdulmejid renamed her Tirimüjgan, which meant "darting-like eyelashes". Her granddaughter Ayşe depicted her as having "hazel green eyes and quite long, light brown hair, pale skin of translucent white colour, thin waist, slender body structure, and very good-looking hands and feet." Temperamentally, she was known for her refined and gentle manner. In addition, she dabbled in poetry, although she was not particularly talented.

== Marriage ==
Tirimüjgan married Abdulmejid in 1840. She was given the title of "Third Kadın". She was known for her refinement, politeness, and beauty. Charles White said the following about her:

The second,...has the reputation of great beauty and accomplishments, and of writing tolerable poetry.

Tirimüjgan gave birth to two princes and one princess. On 11 October 1840, she gave birth to her first child, a daughter Naime Sultan, who died of smallpox at the age of two and a half on 1 May 1843. On 21 September 1842, she gave birth to her second child, a son Şehzade Abdul Hamid (later Abdul Hamid II) On 22 April 1848, she gave birth to her third child Şehzade Mehmed Abid, who died fifteen days later on 7 May 1848. Abdul Hamid named one of his daughters, Naime Sultan and one of his sons, Şehzade Mehmed Abid after these siblings of his.

Having lost a daughter, Tirimüjgan devoted herself to her son, and bestowed him with precious and special gifts. Even during her illness, she did everything she could to ensure his happiness. He would go every day to Beylerbeyi Palace to see her, then return to Dolmabahçe Palace. Abdul Hamid kept her gifts with him for his entire life and they had a special place in his heart.

Nergisnihal Hanım was one of the closest servants of Tirimüjgan. She had appointed her to the service of her infant daughter Naime, and after Naime's death to the service of Abdul Hamid. Before Tirimüjgan died she imparted to Nergisnihal "I entrust my son to you, Do not abandon him, so long as you live, sleep outside of his room. After her death, she did the same as Tirimüjgan bequeathed her, and never left Abdul Hamid. She died in 1892.

== Death ==
Tirimüjgan died on 3 October 1852 in the Beylerbeyi Palace, and was buried in the mausoleum of new ladies in New Mosque, Istanbul. Having died before her son ascended the throne, she was never Valide Sultan. Her death was kept secret from her son for ample amount of time, although when he was informed, the young child weeped and cried continuously on the loss of his mother.

Among all her fellow consorts, she felt the closest to Perestu Kadın and always held her in high regard. After her death, Abdul Hamid was adopted by Perestu, who had also been the adoptive mother of Cemile Sultan.

In 1887, her son had commissioned a mosque in Rhodes in her memory, and also named a steamship after her.

== Issue ==
Name	Birth	Death	Notes
Naime Sultan	11 October 1840	1 May 1843	born in Topkapı Palace; buried in Tomb of Mustafa III
Abdul Hamid II	21 September 1842	10 February 1918	34th Sultan of the Ottoman Empire
Şehzade Mehmed Abid	22 April 1848	7 May 1848	born in Çırağan Palace; buried in New Mosque

== In literature ==
- Tirimüjgan is a character in Hıfzı Topuz's historical novel Abdülmecit: İmparatorluk Çökerken Sarayda 22 Yıl: Roman (2009).

== See also ==
- Kadın (title)
- List of consorts of the Ottoman Sultans
- List of mothers of the Ottoman sultans
- Ottoman Imperial Harem

== Sources ==
- Uluçay, M. Çağatay (2011). Padişahların kadınları ve kızları. Ötüken. ISBN 978-9-754-37840-5.
- Sakaoğlu, Necdet (2008). Bu Mülkün Kadın Sultanları: Vâlide Sultanlar, Hâtunlar, Hasekiler, Kandınefendiler, Sultanefendiler. Oğlak Yayıncılık. ISBN 978-6-051-71079-2.
- Brookes, Douglas Scott (2010). The Concubine, the Princess, and the Teacher: Voices from the Ottoman Harem. University of Texas Press. ISBN 978-0-292-78335-5.
- Paşa, Ahmed Cevdet (1960). Tezâkir. [2]. 13 - 20, Volume 2. Türk Tarih Kurumu Basımevi.
