= Order of the House of Osman =

Award of the Ottoman Empire

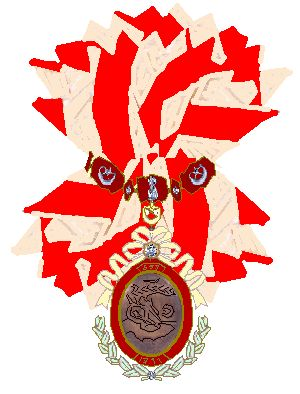
- Type: Order
- Country: Ottoman Empire
- Presented by: Ottoman Sultan
- Status: No longer awarded
- Established: 31 August 1893
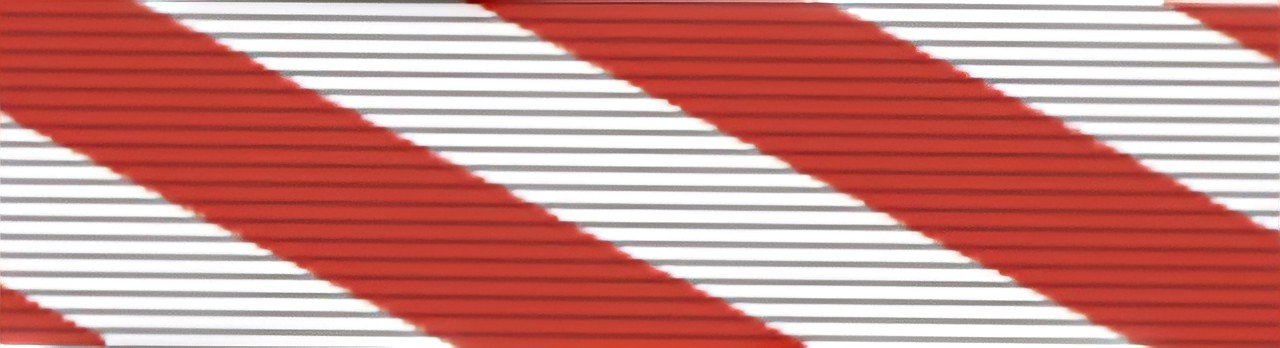
- Ribbon of the order

The Order of the House of Osman (Ottoman Turkish: نشانِ خاندانِ آلِ عثمان, Modern Turkish: Hanedan-i-Ali-Osman) was an order of the Ottoman Empire founded on 31 August 1893 by Sultan Abdul Hamid II. It was awarded to senior male and female members of the Imperial family, statesmen, and foreign heads of state. The order was awarded in only one grade.

== Description ==
The order consisted of a badge. It was an oval medallion in gold, with the tughra of Sultan Abdul Hamid, and the inscriptions "Relying on the Assistance of Almighty God" above and "Sovereign of the Ottoman Empire" below the tughra. Surrounding the center medallion is a red enameled ring bearing the dates 699 AH and 1311 AH, which correspond to 1299 AD (the date of the founding of the Ottoman Empire) and 1895 AD (the date of the founding of the order). At the bottom of the medallion is a spray of laurel leaves in white enamel, and around the top a bow in white enamel, topped by a white enameled crescent and star suspension.

The badge could be worn either from a collar composed of red enameled plaques bearing white crescents and stars, or from a wide bow ribbon of red and white diagonal stripes, with a short enameled gold chain similar to the collar around the center of the ribbon. The ribbon bow was to be worn only when no ribbons or sashes of other orders were worn simultaneously.

== Recipients ==
Ottoman recipients

- Ahmet Tevfik Pasha
- Abdulmejid II

Foreign recipients

- Edward VII
- Abbas II of Egypt
