= Hatice Sultan (daughter of Murad V) =

Ottoman princess, daughter of Murad V and Şayan Kadın (1870–1938)

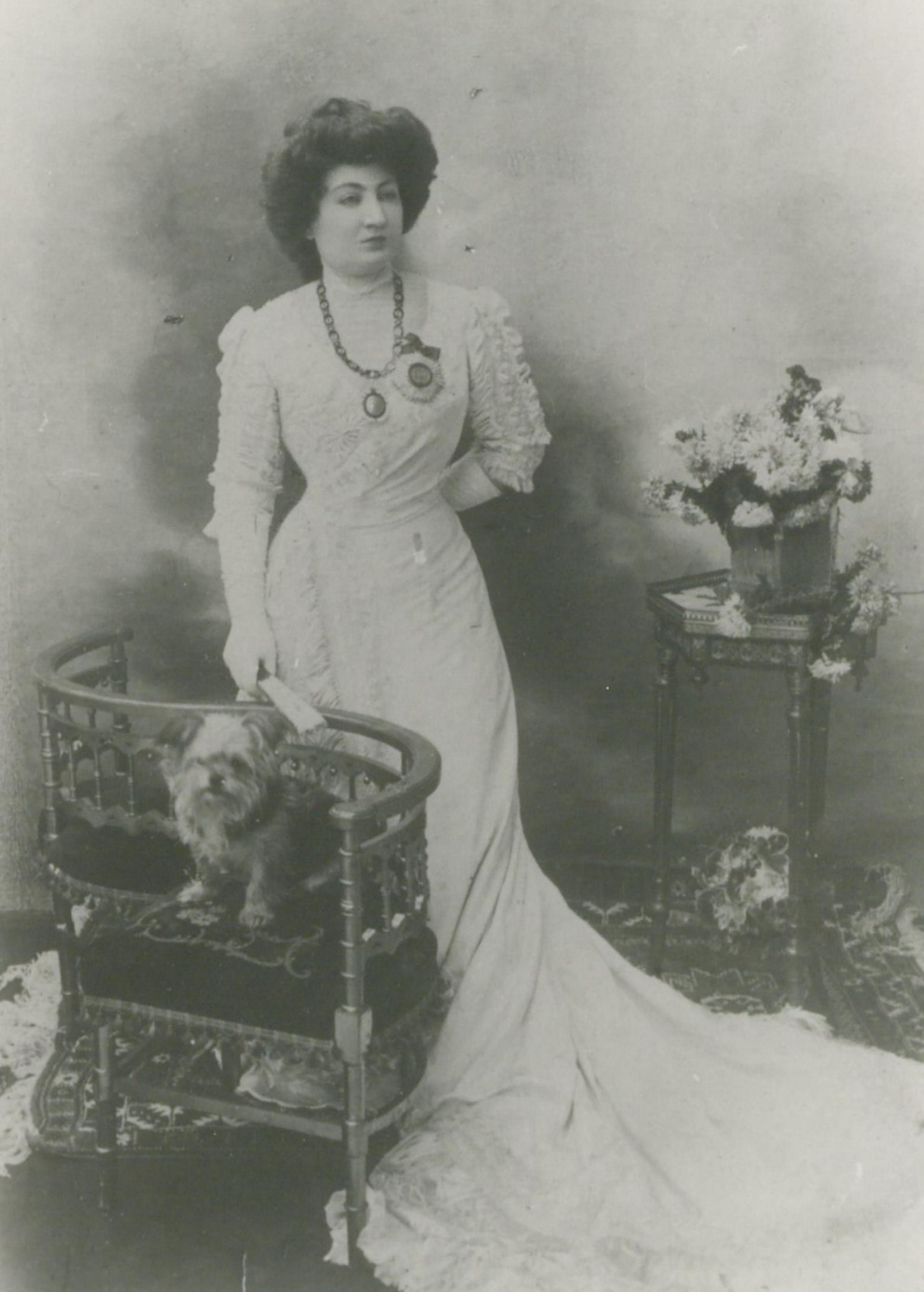
- Born: 5 April 1870; Kurbağalıdere Köşkü, Constantinople, Ottoman Empire
- Died: 13 March 1938 (aged 67); Beirut, French Lebanon
- Burial: Sulaymaniyya Takiyya, Damascus, Syria
- Spouse: Ali Vasıf Pasha (m. 1901; div. 1908) Rauf Hayreddin Bey (m. 1909; div. 1918)
- Issue more...: Selma Hanımsultan
Names
- Turkish: Hatice Sultan; Ottoman Turkish: خدیجه سلطان
- Dynasty: Ottoman
- Father: Murad V
- Mother: Şayan Kadın
- Religion: Sunni Islam

Hatice Sultan (Ottoman Turkish: خدیجه سلطان; 5 April 1870 – 13 March 1938) was an Ottoman princess, the eldest daughter of Sultan Murad V, born by his third consort Şayan Kadın.

== Early life ==
Hatice Sultan was born on 5 April 1870 in her father's villa in Kurbağalıdere to Şehzade Mehmed Murad (the future Sultan Murad V) and his third consort, Şayan Kadın (born Safiye Zan). She was her father’s eldest daughter and third child and her mother’s only child.

During Şayan's pregnancy with Hatice, the valide sultan, Pertevniyal ordered her to have an abortion. Ottoman princes were only allowed to have one child during the reign of Pertevniyal's son Abdulaziz. Murad had already had two sons with the support of the Sultan, but this time Pertevniyal Sultan insisted on her rules being followed. Murad, possibly again with Abdulaziz's help, bribed Dr Emin Pasha to lie to Pertevniyal that the abortion had been performed. Şayan gave birth in secret and Hatice's existence was kept hidden until 1876.

Upon Murad's accession to the throne on 30 May 1876 following the deposition of his uncle Abdulaziz, the family settled in Dolmabahçe Palace. After three months, Murad was himself deposed on 30 August 1876 due to his mental instability and imprisoned in Çırağan Palace by his half-brother Abdul Hamid II. Hatice and her mother followed him into confinement. She was Murad V's favorite daughter.

== Life in confinement ==
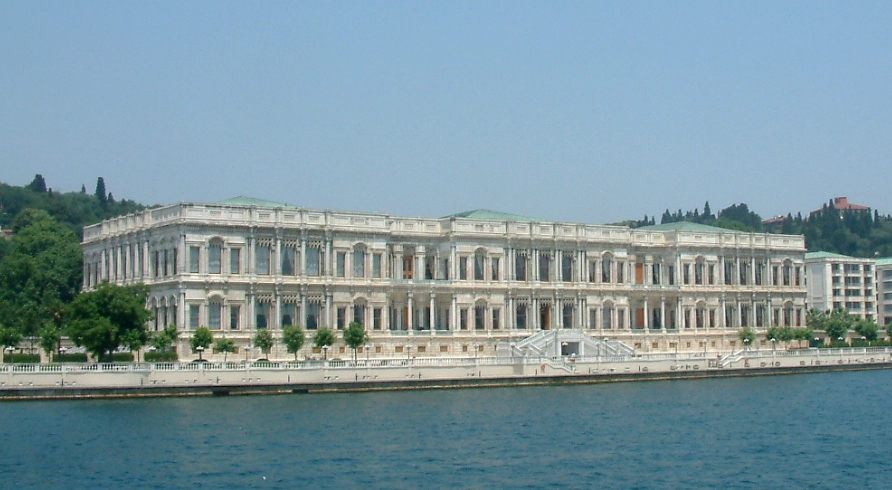
Çırağan Palace, where Hatice's family was imprisoned by Abdul Hamid II for twenty-eight years.

At the time of her family's confinement, Hatice Sultan was six years old. She moved into Çırağan Palace with a large family consisting of her father, her paternal grandmother Şevkefza Sultan, her mother, her father's three other consorts (the kadıns Elaru Mevhibe, Reftarıdil, and Meyliservet), her fifteen-year-old half-brother Şehzade Mehmed Selaheddin and her baby half-sister Fehime Sultan (both the children of Meyliservet), as well as five lower-ranking concubines (the gözdes Resan Hanım, Gevherriz, Nevdür, Remzşinas, and Filizten). Two more sisters were born during the early years of the family's imprisonment, Fatma Sultan and Aliye Sultan, daughters of Resan Hanım. Murad V loved his children and often spent time with them.

Hatice loved stories and would even make up her own endings while listening to them. According to Filizten Hanım, her father's consort, this showed she had a 'vivid imagination' and was 'advanced for her age'. She started reading novels as soon as she could read, taking them from her father's library and staying up with them all night. Most of her readings were the works of French authors in their original language. Hatice had been taught French by her father and his sixth consort, Gevherriz Hanım. Gevherriz also taught her to play the piano.

Filizten Hanım considered Hatice's nature to be too romantic, describing her as sensitive, fiery, exuberant, beautiful, lively, and intelligent. Growing up, Hatice suffered from the isolation of palace life and often complained about it.

== First marriage ==
As she became a young adult, Hatice openly expressed her desire to marry. When her father learnt of this through her mother and the other older women of the household, he was dismayed at being unable to arrange a marriage from her prison, but he eventually notified his reigning brother, Abdul Hamid II. Abdul Hamid offered to find husbands for his nieces on the condition that once they leave the palace, they may not visit. Both princesses were asked whether they preferred to stay with their family or to get married, and both chose leaving. Abdul Hamid sent them to Yıldız Palace. He fully renovated a yalı in Ortaköy, ordered a second one to be built, furnished both, and sent photographs to Murad.

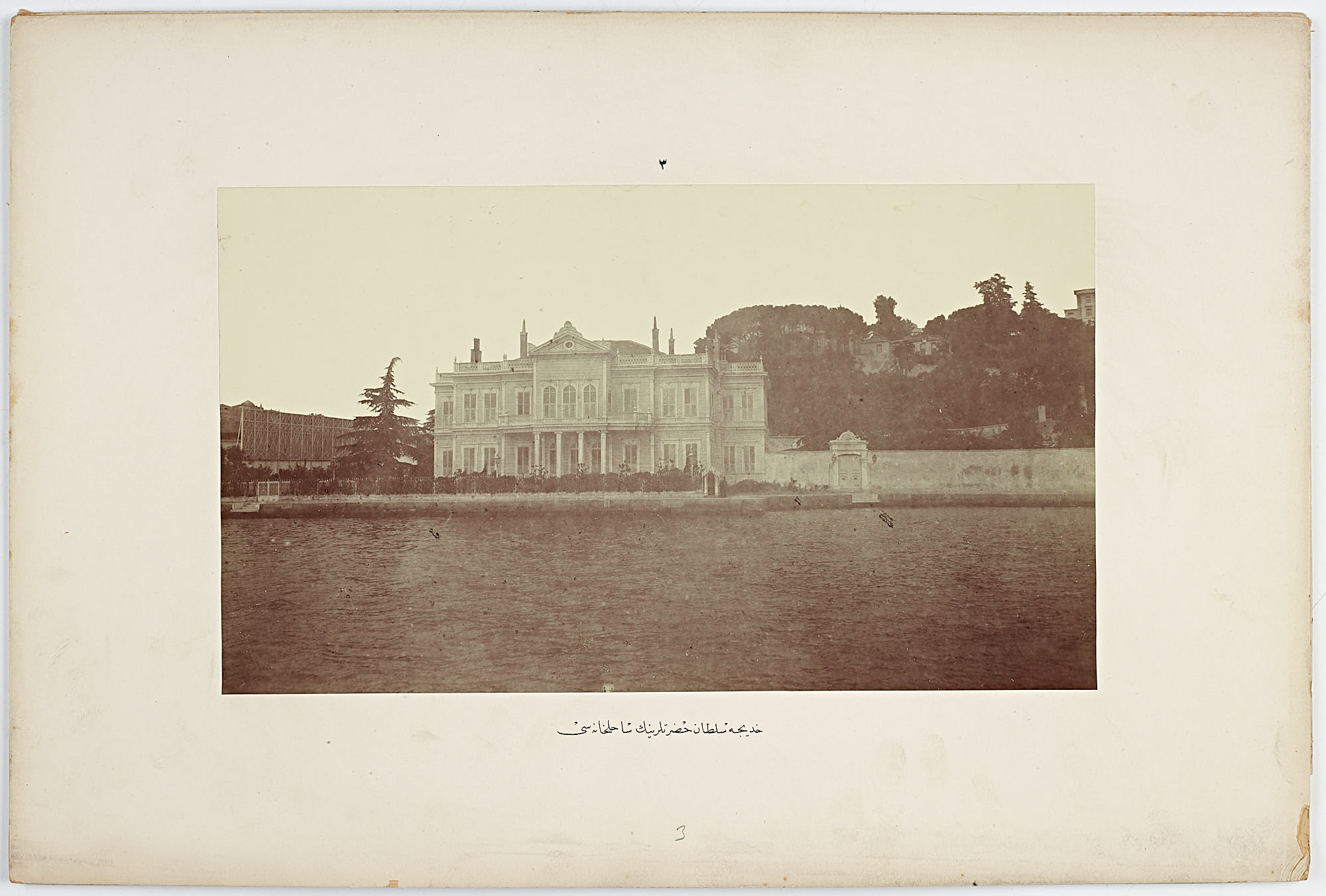
Hatice Sultan Yalı in Ortaköy on a contemporary photograph.

In October 1898, she and her sister Fehime met the German empress Augusta Victoria of Schleswig-Holstein who visited Istanbul with her husband, Emperor Wilhelm II. Abdul Hamid worried that if he presented only his daughters but not his nieces to the Empress, it would hurt the feelings of Hatice and Fehime.

Abdul Hamid planned to marry Hatice to Kabasakal Çerkes Mehmed Pasha, widower of his sister, Naile Sultan. However, the marriage did not happen. In 1901, Abdul Hamid arranged her marriage to one of her father's table servants, Ali Vasıf Pasha, Code Scribe. The wedding took place on 3 September 1901 in Yıldız Palace.

The couple were given one of the yalıs in Ortaköy as their residence. The marriage was unhappy from the start. Hatice locked the door to her apartments on their wedding night and did so every time her husband was home. However, the marriage was presumably consummated, as Hatice had a daughter, Ayşe Hanımsultan, whom her husband acknowledged as his own.

=== Affair and divorce ===
Naime Sultan, daughter of Sultan Abdul Hamid II was Hatice's neighbour in Ortaköy. Hatice Sultan started an affair with Naime's husband, Mehmed Kemaleddin Pasha, which lasted for three years. According to Filizten Hanım, they decided to murder Naime so they could get married. This relationship was discovered in early 1904. According to Filizten Hanim, the relationship was consummated. According to Semih Mümtaz, whose father held Kemaleddin under house arrest, the couple only exchanged letters over the walls that separated their respective gardens or had fleeting encounters. The scandal was discussed not only throughout the Ottoman Empire but also in Europe and America. Western press reported that the Sultan's son-in-law had been arrested and sent into exile as a result of secret correspondence between him and Hatice Sultan.

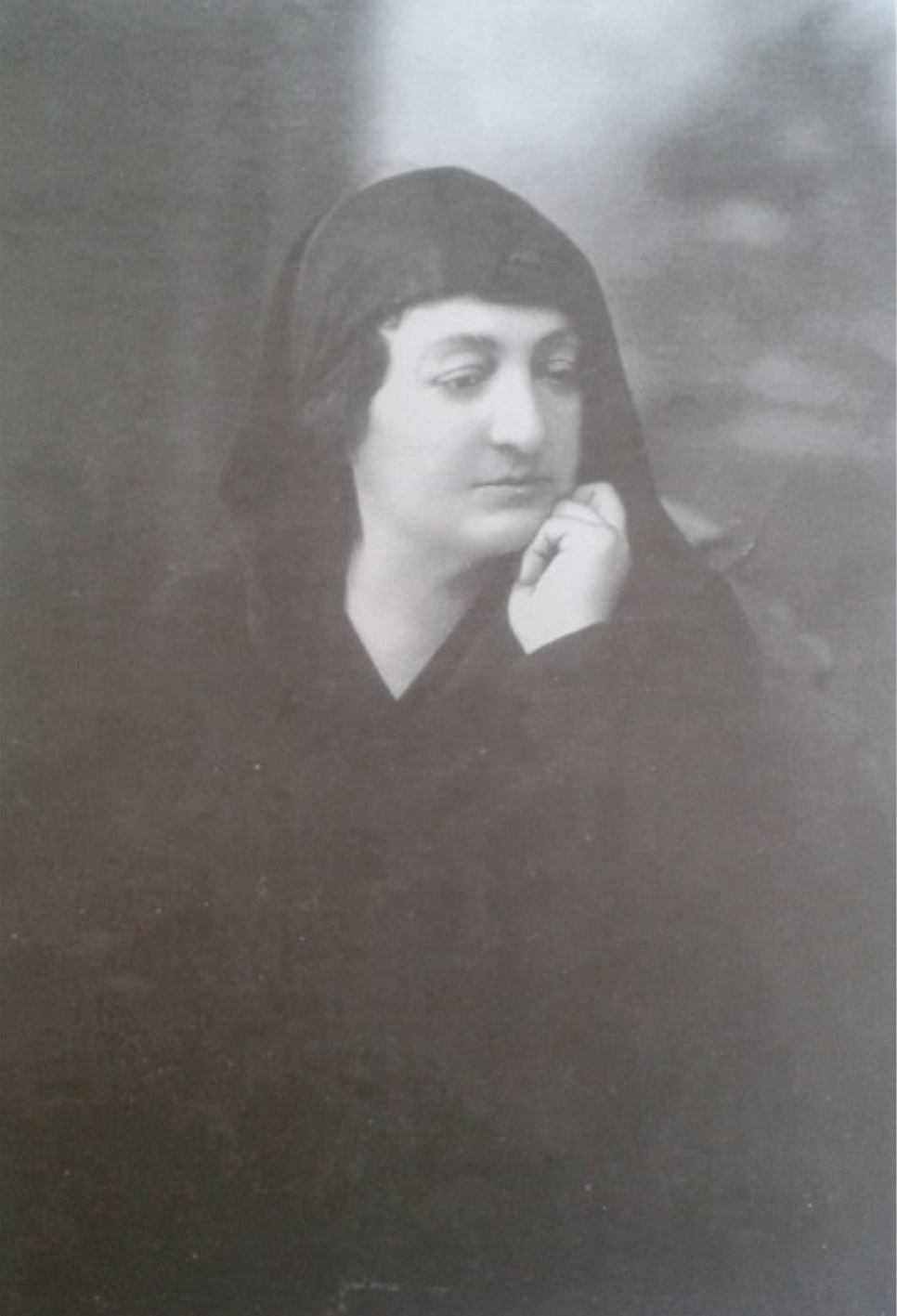
Hatice Sultan in Istanbul.

Hatice's feelings and motives in the affair are uncertain. Kemaleddin was in love with her, his letters lamenting her absence, asking when they could meet or if they could meet earlier than agreed, and recounted that he slowed down in front of his villa to see her exit hers and get in her carriage. Filizten and Hatice's granddaughter both believed that seducing the husband of Abdul Hamid II's favourite daughter was just a way for Hatice to take revenge for her family's imprisonment and her late, unhappy marriage. Others thought that Hatice loved Kemaleddin sincerely, even if only as an escape from her unhappy marriage.

The couple were accused of planning to poison their respective spouses in order to get married. According to Filizten Hanım, the pain and shame caused by his favourite daughter's disgrace led to Murad V's death. A diabetic, he was already weakened by grief over the recent death of his youngest daughter, Atiye Sultan. When he heard of the affair, the shock seemingly hastened his death.

Abdul Hamid was angered and ordered Naime Sultan to divorce her husband, then stripped Kemaleddin Pasha of all his military honours and exiled him to Bursa. He later forgave Hatice, and she was invited back to Yıldız Palace. He did not, however, give her permission to divorce her husband. Hatice could only divorce Ali Vasıf around 1908, when Abdul Hamid II was deposed and replaced by Mehmed V, his younger half-brother. With the declaration of the Second Constitutional Era in 1908, Kemaleddin Pasha was forgiven. He returned to Istanbul to propose marriage to Hatice, which the princess refused, either out of pride or because she was already infatuated with her future second husband.

== Second marriage ==
Hatice Sultan married Rauf Hayreddin Bey (1871–1936), son of Hayri Bey, on 11 May 1909. They had three children together. Although this was a love match, the relationship soon soured and the two divorced in 1918. Eventually, Hatice settled in a mansion with Arife Kadriye Sultan, the granddaughter of one of her father's half-brothers. She worked to help her father's consorts who, as widows, had been freed from Çırağa Palace but became impoverished as their allowances were reduced or suspended. She hosted Nevdürr Hanım personally and wrote several letters to ensure that the others were given enough income for a comfortable life.

== Philanthropy ==
In 1912, the Hilal-i Ahmer Centre for Women was organised within the Ottoman Hilal-i Ahmer Association, a foundation established in 1877 to provide medical care in Istanbul and surrounding communities. In May 1915, during the Gallipoli campaign Hatice visited Kadırga hospital as a member of the centre, distributing handkerchiefs and cigarettes amongst soldiers. She also donated tea and sugar to the hospital.

== Life in exile and death ==
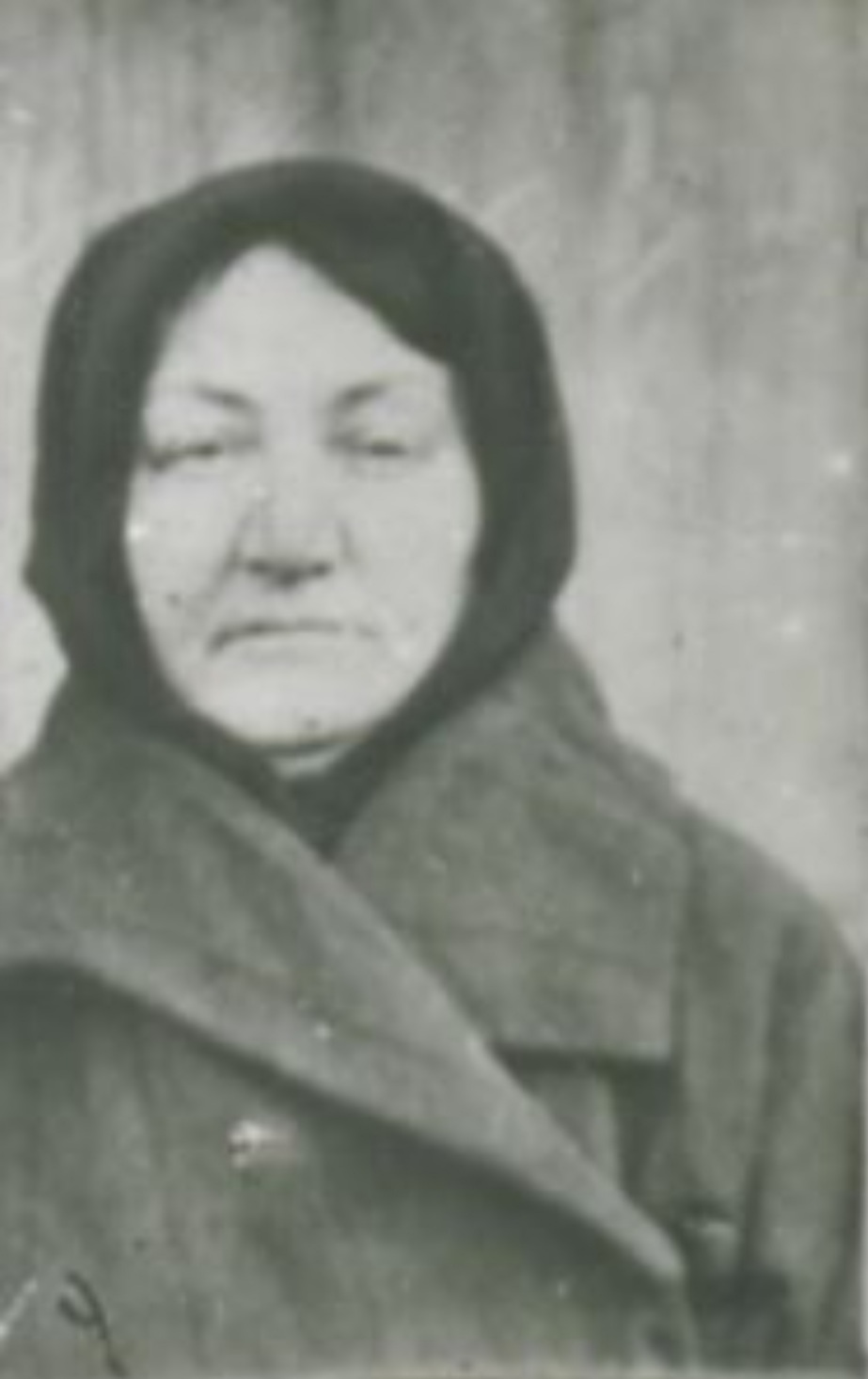
Hatice Sultan in exile.

Following the imperial family's the exile in March 1924, Hatice Sultan and her two living children, Hayri and Selma, settled in Beirut. They lived on alimony paid by her ex-husband, Rauf Bey. However, when he was implicated in a smuggling plot, he was dismissed from his job and imprisoned, leaving his family with no income. Under these circumstances, Hatice felt pressure to quickly marry her daughter, but it was difficult to find a suitable husband for impoverished Turkish royalty. Eventually, Selma moved to India to marry Syed Sajid Husain Ali, Raja of Kotdwar, in 1937. Afterwards, her son-in-law provided Hatice with an income. The philosopher Rıza Tevfik visited her in the 1930s. Although Hatice was no longer young and living in a small house, he found her beautiful and dignified. She suffered a stroke, and died in poverty on 13 March 1938, at the age of sixty-seven. She was buried in the cemetery of the Sulaymaniyya Takiyya in Damascus.

== Honours ==
Styles of Hatice Sultan
- Reference style: Her Imperial Highness
- Spoken style: Your Imperial Highness

- Order of the House of Osman
- Order of Charity, 1st Class

== Issue ==
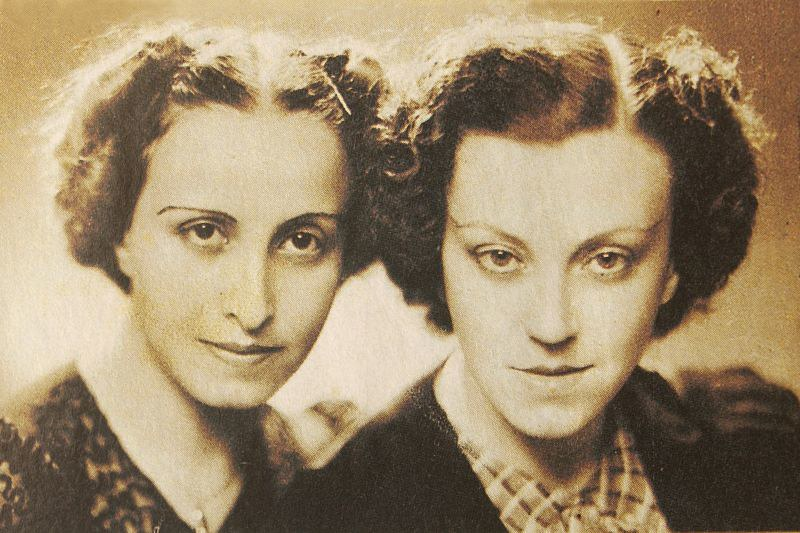
Hatice (left) with her lastborn, her daughter Selma

Name	Birth	Death	Notes
Ali Vasıf Pasha (married 1901 – divorced 1908)
Ayşe Hanımsultan	1902	Unknown	Presumably died in infancy
By Rauf Hayri Bey (married 1909 – divorced 1918; 1871 – 1936)
Sultanzade Osman Bey	1910	31 January 1911	Died in infancy. Buried in tomb of Şehzade Ahmed Kemaleddin, Yahya Efendi Cemetery.
Sultanzade Hayri Bey	19 June 1912	c. 1951	Died unmarried in exile in Beirut.
Selma Hanımsultan	13 April 1916	13 January 1942	Married Syed Sajid Husain Zaidi, Raja of Kotdwar (1910–1991) in 1937, and had issue, a daughter, Kenizé Mourad (born November 1939 in Paris); died in Paris, France. Buried in Bobigny cemetery.

== In literature and popular culture ==
- In the 2012 movie The Sultan's Women, Hatice Sultan is portrayed by Turkish actress Melike Günal Kurtulmuş.
- In the 2017 TV series Payitaht: Abdülhamid, Hatice Sultan is portrayed by Turkish actress Gözde Kaya.
- Hatice Sultan is a character in Ayşe Osmanoğlu's historical novel The Gilded Cage on the Bosphorus (2020).
- Hatice Sultan is a character in Kenizé Mourad's historical novel Regards from the Dead Princess (1987).

== See also ==
- List of Ottoman princesses

== Sources ==
- Bağce, Betül Kübra (2008). II. Abdulhamid kızı Naime Sultan'in Hayati (Postgraguate Thesis) (in Turkish). Marmara University Institute of Social Sciences.
- Brookes, Douglas Scott (2010). The Concubine, the Princess, and the Teacher: Voices from the Ottoman Harem. University of Texas Press. ISBN 978-0-292-78335-5.
- Sakaoğlu, Necdet (2008). Bu mülkün kadın sultanları: Vâlide sultanlar, hâtunlar, hasekiler, kadınefendiler, sultanefendiler. Oğlak Yayıncılık. ISBN 978-9-753-29623-6.
- Uluçay, Mustafa Çağatay (2011). Padişahların kadınları ve kızları. Ankara: Ötüken. ISBN 978-9-754-37840-5.
