= Fatma Sultan (daughter of Murad V) =

Ottoman princess, daughter of Murad V and Resan Hanım

- Born: 19 June 1879; Çırağan Palace, Constantinople, Ottoman Empire (now Istanbul, Turkey)
- Died: 20 November 1932 (aged 53); Sofia, Bulgaria
- Burial: Sofia, Bulgaria
- Spouse: Damat Karacehennemzade Refik Iris Bey (m. 1907)
- Issue: Sultanzade Mehmed Bey; Ayşe Hatice Hanımsultan; Sultanzade Mehmed Ali Bey; Sultanzade Mehmed Murad Bey; Sultanzade Celaleddin Bey
- Dynasty: Ottoman
- Father: Murad V
- Mother: Resan Hanım
- Religion: Sunni Islam

Fatma Sultan (Ottoman Turkish: فاطمه سلطان; 19 June 1879 – 20 November 1932) was an Ottoman princess, the daughter of Sultan Murad V and Resan Hanım.

== Early life ==
Fatma Sultan was born on 19 June 1879, during the third year of her family's confinement in Çırağan Palace. Her father was Murad V, son of Abdulmejid I and Şevkefza Kadın. She was named after Murad's favourite sister, Fatma Sultan, and after her maternal grandmother. Her mother was Resan Hanım. She was the sixth child, and third daughter of her father and the eldest child of her mother. She had a sister, Aliye Sultan, one year younger than her. She was the first of Murad's children born after he was deposed and the first born in the Çırağan Palace during his confinement there.

According to Filizten Hanım, Fatma was calm, dignified, serious-minded, polite, and gentle, differentiated by her elder half-sisters, Hatice Sultan and Fehime Sultan. She spent a substantial part of her time playing the piano and reading books in French. Unlike her half-sisters, she chose not to leave the palace to marry before her father's death, because Abdul Hamid II had stipulated that any of Murad's daughters who married could never see him or their family again. After the death of her father, Sultan Murad, in 1904, her ordeal in the Çırağan Palace came to an end.

== Marriage ==
In 1907, Abdul Hamid arranged Fatma's marriage to Karacehennemzade Refik Bey, who was eight years her junior, a diplomat and son of the Governor and Senator of Konya, Faik Bey, and grandson of Ibrahim Ağa. The marriage took place on 29 July 1907 in the Yıldız Palace. He became a Damat. The couple was given Esma Sultan Mansion, located in Ortaköy, as their residence.

The marriage was happy and the two together had five children, Sultanzade Mehmed Bey, born on 1908 and died in 1911, twins Ayşe Hatice Hanımsultan and Sultanzade Mehmed Ali Bey born on 20 January 1909, Sultanzade Mehmed Murad Bey born in August 1910 and died in January 1911, and Sultanzade Celaleddin Bey born on 23 April 1916.

In 1908, her mother Resan Hanim left the Çırağan Palace, where she had stayed to keep company to Şayan Kadın, and came to live with her.

Fatma Sultan inherited her mother’s jewels when she died in 1910, but never wore them. She lived frugally and like an ordinary citizen of Istanbul, even going out herself for the shopping. She was particularly devoted to her husband.

At the exile of the imperial family in March 1924, every person had to leave Turkey in seven days. Fatma Sultan, who had measles that time, was allowed to reside in Istanbul until she recovered. She and her family left Turkey in September 1924, making them the last imperial family members to leave Istanbul. They settled in Sofia, Bulgaria.

== Death ==
Fatma Sultan died at the age of fifty three on 23 November 1932 in Sofia, Bulgaria, and was buried there. Her husband outlived her by twenty years and died in 1952.

== Honours ==
- Order of the House of Osman
- Order of Charity, 1st Class
- Order of the Medjidie, 1st Class

== Issue ==
Name	Birth	Death	Notes
Sultanzade Mehmed Bey	1908	22 November 1911	Died in infancy
Ayşe Hatice Hanımsultan	20 January 1909	14 October 1968	Unmarried and without issue
Sultanzade Mehmed Ali Bey	20 January 1909	1981	Unmarried and without issue; buried in Yahya Efendi Cemetery
Sultanzade Mehmed Murad Bey	August 1910	January 1911	Died in infancy
Sultanzade Celaleddin Iris Bey	23 April 1916	18 November 1997	Married Telgüzar Hanım (died in 2014) and had a son, Faik Iris (Sofia, 1945 - 1993), and a daughter, Resan Iris (born on 15 November 1956), married Deveci, she had issue, a daughter, Serra Deveci (born on 19 March 1979), married Tuncer, and a son, Emirhan Deveci (born on 23 March 1991); buried in New Mosque, Istanbul

== In literature and popular culture ==
- In the 2017 TV series Payitaht: Abdülhamid, Fatma Sultan is portrayed by Turkish actress Alara Turan.
- Fatma Sultan is a character in Ayşe Osmanoğlu's historical novel The Gilded Cage on the Bosphorus (2020).

== See also ==
- List of Ottoman princesses

== Sources ==
- Brookes, Douglas Scott (2010). The Concubine, the Princess, and the Teacher: Voices from the Ottoman Harem. University of Texas Press. ISBN 978-0-292-78335-5.
- Sakaoğlu, Necdet (2008). Bu mülkün kadın sultanları: Vâlide sultanlar, hâtunlar, hasekiler, kadınefendiler, sultanefendiler. Oğlak Yayıncılık. ISBN 978-9-753-29623-6.
- Uluçay, Mustafa Çağatay (2011). Padişahların kadınları ve kızları. Ankara: Ötüken. ISBN 978-9-754-37840-5.
- Yolcu, Cengiz (2018). Sofya'da Medfun Bir Osmanlı Sultanı: V. Murad'ın Kızı Fatma Sultan.
