= Aliye Sultan =

Ottoman princess, daughter of Murad V and Resan Hanım

- Born: 24 August 1880; Çırağan Palace, Istanbul, Ottoman Empire (now Istanbul, Turkey)
- Died: 17 September 1903 (aged 23); Yıldız Palace, Istanbul, Ottoman Empire
- Burial: Mehmed Ali Pasha Mausoleum, Eyüp Cemetery, Istanbul, Turkey
- Dynasty: Ottoman
- Father: Murad V
- Mother: Resan Hanım
- Religion: Sunni Islam

Aliye Sultan (Ottoman Turkish: عالیه سلطان; 24 August 1880 – 17 September 1903) was an Ottoman princess, the daughter of Sultan Murad V and Resan Hanım.

== Early life ==
Aliye Sultan was born on 24 August 1880 in the Çırağan Palace, during her family's confinement in the palace after her father was deposed. Her father was Murad V, son of Abdulmejid I and Şevkefza Kadın. Her mother was Resan Hanım. She was the seventh child, and fourth daughter of her father and the second of her mother's two children. She had a sister, Fatma Sultan, one year elder than her. She took her name from Aliye Sultan, her father's sister, who died as a child.

== Illness and death ==
In 1903, Aliye Sultan had come down with a slight cold, but after the cold passed she could not recover her health. Slowly she began to weaken, even though no trace of her illness remained. The doctors found that her lungs were a bit weak and they felt she needed a change of air. And so her father sent her up to Yıldız Palace, although he was upset, because he was very close to all his children and did not want Aliye to leave too, as her half-sisters Hatice Sultan and Fehime Sultan had already left the Çırağan Palace in 1889 to get married and could not return to visit him because Abdul Hamid II forbade it.

Aliye Sultan didn't recover from her illness and died unmarried on 17 September 1903 at the age of twenty three. Abdul Hamid II did not allow her parents or sisters to see her before or after her death. She was buried in the mausoleum of Kapudan Pasha Mehmed Ali Pasha located in Eyüp Cemetery, Istanbul. Her mother outlived her by seven years, dying in 1910. Her death, together with the scandal involving his daughter Hatice Sultan the following year, permanently undermined the health of Murad, who died shortly after in mid-1904.

== In popular culture and literature ==
- In the 2017 TV series Payitaht: Abdülhamid, Aliye Sultan is portrayed by Turkish actress Gökşin Saraç.
- Aliye is a character in Ayşe Osmanoğlu's historical novel The Gilded Cage on the Bosphorus (2020).

== See also ==
- List of Ottoman princesses

== Sources ==
- Brookes, Douglas Scott (2010). The Concubine, the Princess, and the Teacher: Voices from the Ottoman Harem. University of Texas Press. ISBN 978-0-292-78335-5.
- Sakaoğlu, Necdet (2008). Bu mülkün kadın sultanları: Vâlide sultanlar, hâtunlar, hasekiler, kadınefendiler, sultanefendiler. Oğlak Yayıncılık. ISBN 978-9-753-29623-6.
- Uluçay, Mustafa Çağatay (2011). Padişahların kadınları ve kızları. Ankara, Ötüken.
