= Gözde Kaya =

Turkish actress (born 1988)

- Born: 7 November 1988 (age 37); Antalya, Turkey
- Occupation: Actress
- Years active: 2011–present
- Awards: Turkey Youth Awards for Best Supporting TV Actress (nominated)

Gözde Kaya (born 7 November 1988) is a Turkish actress.

== Life and career ==
Her sister is also an actress. She graduated from the United Arts Department of Yıldız Technical University. Then she graduated from the Musical Theatre Department of Istanbul University. Kaya stepped into her career through photographer Nihat Odabaşı whom she met on a restaurant in İzmir.

In 2011, she started her acting career, her first series was Kalbimin Seni Seçti on which she depicted the character of İpek, it starred Sermiyan Midyat, İdil Fırat and Ezgi Eyüboğlu. In 2012, she made her debut in the series Uçurum and portrayed the character of Masha. In 2013, she appeared in the series Benim Hala Umudum Var. Simultaneously in 2014, she appeared in series Gölgedekiler and Sil Baştan and portrayed the character of Maya. In 2015, she appeared in their series Çilek Kokusu and portrayed the character of Çağla, it starred Demet Özdemir and Yusuf Çim as the leading characters.

In 2017, she appeared in the historical fiction series Payitaht: Abdülhamid and portrayed the character of Hatice Sultan, the daughter of Ottoman Sultan Murad V and Şayan Kadın. In 2017, she appeared in crime, drama, love series Ramo and portrayed the character of Nadya, the darling of the character Cihangir. In 2019, she made her beaut in the series Vuslat and depicted the character of Sultan Korkmazer. After Payitaht Abdülhamid, she is playing in series Senden Daha Güzel with Cemre Baysel for twice.

== Filmography ==
Television

Year	Title	Role	Episodes
2011	Kalbimin Seni Seçti	İpek	
2012	Uçurum	Masha	
2013	Benim Hala Umudum Var		
2014	Gölgedekiler		
2014	Sil Baştan	Maya	
2015	Rumuz Cavidan	Yeter	
2015	Çilek Kokusu	Çagla	1-23
2017	Payitaht: Abdülhamid	Hatice Sultan	1-54
2019–2020	Vuslat	Sultan Korkmazer	1-35
2020	Ramo	Nadya	
2022	Senden Daha Güzel	Gülden	

Film

Year	Title	Role	Notes
2023	10 Days of a Good Man		Netflix original film

== Awards ==
Awards
Year	Award	Category	Result
2018	Turkey Youth Awards	Best Supporting TV Actress	Nominated
