= Remzşinas Hanım =

Consort of Ottoman Sultan Murad V

- Born: 1864; Caucausus
- Died: After 1934; Istanbul, Turkey
- Spouse: Murad V (m. 1881; died 1904)
Names
- Turkish: Remzşinas Hanım; Ottoman Turkish: رمزشناس خانم
- House: Ottoman (by marriage)
- Father: Bıjeduğ Hasan Bey
- Religion: Sunni Islam

Remzşinas Hanım (Ottoman Turkish: رمزشناس خانم; meaning "Knower of Signs"), also called Remsşinaz Hanım, was a consort of Sultan Murad V of the Ottoman Empire.

== Life ==
Murad ascended the throne on 30 May 1876, after the deposition of his uncle Sultan Abdulaziz, After reigning for three months, Murad too was deposed on 30 August 1876, due to mental instability and was imprisoned in the Çırağan Palace. Remzşinas was of Circassian ancestry, and came to Istanbul after the Russian invasion of Caucasus. She was chosen to be sent to Çırağan Palace around 1881, where Murad took her as his consort.

She was widowed upon Murad's death in 1904, after which her ordeal in the Çırağan Palace came to an end. In widowhood, her stipend consisted of 1500 kuruş. However, later, during the reign of Sultan Mehmed V, it was reduced to only 500 kuruş. After which her step-daughter, Hatice Sultan, wrote to Mehmet Cavit Bey, member of the Committee of Union and Progress (CUP), asking him to raise her stipend at least to 800 kuruş. After Murad's death she initially stayed at Çırağan Palace to keep company with Şayan Kadın, the third consort, who refused to leave the palace, but in 1910 she was sent to Bursa with other consorts Nevdürr Hanım, Gevherriz Hanım and Filizten Hanım. She returned to Istanbul in 1914.

Upon the exile of the imperial family in March 1924, Remzşinas, being the adjunct member of the family, decided to stay in Istanbul. She died after 1934.

== In literature ==
- Remzşinas is a character in Ayşe Osmanoğlu's historical novel The Gilded Cage on the Bosphorus (2020).

== See also ==
- Ikbal (title)
- Ottoman Imperial Harem
- List of consorts of the Ottoman sultans

== Sources ==
- Brookes, Douglas Scott (2010). The concubine, the princess, and the teacher: Voices from the Ottoman Harem, based on Filizten's memoir, Twenty-Eight Years in Çırağan Palace: The Life of Murad V. University of Texas Press. ISBN 9780292718425.
- Bardakçı, Murat (1998). Şahbaba: Osmanoğulları'nın son hükümdarı VI. Mehmed Vahideddin'in hayatı, hatıraları, ve özel mektupları. Pan Yayıncılık. ISBN 978-9-757-65275-5.
