= Gevherriz Hanım =

Consort of Ottoman Sultan Murad V

- Born: c. 1863; Sochi, Russia
- Died: c. 1940 (aged 76–77); Istanbul, Turkey
- Spouse: Murad V
Names
- Turkish: Gevherriz Hanım; Ottoman Turkish: گوھریز خانم
- House: Ottoman (by marriage)
- Father: Halil Bey
- Religion: Sunni Islam

Gevherriz Hanım (Ottoman Turkish: گوھریز خانم; c. 1863 – c. 1940; meaning 'gem parure'), also called Cevherriz Hanım, was a consort of Sultan Murad V of the Ottoman Empire.

== Life ==
Gevherriz Hanım was born circa 1863 in Sochi, which was part of Circassia, the capital of the autonomous Ubykh Principality. She was Circassian and the daughter of Halil Bey. When the Circassians had to flee Russian Empire, she was admitted to the Ottoman court, where she grew up and became a Kalfa (girl servant) before she was noticed by Murad. She married Murad in 1876, during his accession to the throne. She remained childless. After Murad ascended the throne on 30 May 1876 after the deposition of his uncle Sultan Abdulaziz, she was given the title of "Second Ikbal". After reigning for three months, he was deposed on 30 August 1876, due to mental instability and was imprisoned in the Çırağan Palace. Gevherriz also followed Murad into confinement.

She spoke excellent French. She also taught French to young şehzades, Sultans (Ottoman imperial princes and princesses), and Murad's children.

In her memoir, fellow consort Filizten Hanım reported that Gevherriz worked with Nakşifend Kalfa, the hazinedar Dilberengiz, the eunuch Hüseyin Ağa, and Hüsnü Bey (who had been Second Secretary of Murad) to allow for a British doctor to meet with Murad to ascertain Murad's mental fitness. When the doctor arrived, Gevherriz served as translator. It is not clear how true this story is, and it is possible the doctor was sent by freemasons rather than by the British.

She was widowed at Murad's death in 1904, after which her ordeal in the Çırağan Palace came to an end. In widowhood, her stipend consisted of 1500 kuruş. However, later, during the reign of Sultan Mehmed V, it was reduced to only 500 kuruş. Afterwards, her step-daughter, Hatice Sultan, wrote to Mehmet Cavit Bey, member of the Committee of Union and Progress (CUP), asking him to raise her stipend at least to 800 kuruş. Immediately after Murad V's death, she was sent to Bursa for a few years with Murad's other consorts Remzşinas Hanım, Nevdürr Hanım, and Filizten Hanım, but later she came back to Istanbul and married a certain Hüsnü Bey in 1915, but the second marriage was very sad.

At the exile of the imperial family in March 1924, Gevherriz as being the adjunct member of the family decided to stay in Istanbul, where she died in around 1940.

== In literature ==
- Gevherriz is a character in Ayşe Osmanoğlu's historical novel The Gilded Cage on the Bosphorus (2020).

== See also ==
- Ikbal (title)
- Ottoman Imperial Harem
- List of consorts of the Ottoman sultans

== Sources ==
- Brookes, Douglas Scott (2010). The concubine, the princess, and the teacher: Voices from the Ottoman Harem, based on Filizten's memoir, Twenty-Eight Years in Çırağan Palace: The Life of Murad V. University of Texas Press. ISBN 9780292718425.
- Bardakçı, Murat (1998). Şahbaba: Osmanoğulları'nın son hükümdarı VI. Mehmed Vahideddin'in hayatı, hatıraları, ve özel mektupları. Pan Yayıncılık. ISBN 978-9-757-65275-5.
