= Nevdürr Hanım =

Consort of Ottoman Sultan Murad V

- Born: c. 1861; Batumi, Caucasus Viceroyalty, Russian Empire (now Batumi, Adjara, Georgia)
- Died: 1927 (aged 65–66); Beşiktaş, Istanbul, Turkey
- Spouse: Murad V (m. 1880; died 1904)
Names
- Turkish: Nevdürr Hanım; Ottoman Turkish: نودر خانم
- House: Ottoman (by marriage)
- Father: Nakaşvili Rüstem Bey
- Religion: Sunni Islam

Nevdürr Hanım (Ottoman Turkish: نودر خانم, lit. 'the new shine'; 1861 – 1927) was a consort of Sultan Murad V of the Ottoman Empire.

== Life ==
Nevdürr was born to Batumi in 1861, daughter of Nakaşvili Rüstem Bey. She was of Georgian ancestry.

Nevdürr married Murad in 1880 when he had already been deposed and was a prisoner in the Çırağan Palace. She remained childless. After reigning for three months, Murad had been deposed on 30 August 1876, due to mental instability and was imprisoned in the Çırağan Palace. Nevdürr was initially sent to Çırağan Palace as Kalfa (palace attendant), but Murad liked her and decided to take her as his consort.

Nevdürr was widowed upon Murad's death in 1904, after which her ordeal in the Çırağan Palace came to an end. After the death of her husband, she was sent to Bursa with the consorts Gevherriz Hanım, Remzşinas Hanım and Filizten Hanım for a few years and her salary was canceled by the Committee of Union and Progress. Afterwards she went to live with her step-daughter Hatice Sultan whose repeated requests for a salary for Nevdürr were denied. When Hatice Sultan was exiled in 1924, Nevdürr fell in utter poverty. She died in 1927 in the Beşiktaş district in Istanbul.

== In literature ==
- Nevdürr is a character in Ayşe Osmanoğlu's historical novel The Gilded Cage on the Bosphorus (2020).

== See also ==
- Ikbal (title)
- Ottoman Imperial Harem
- List of consorts of the Ottoman sultans

== Sources ==
- Brookes, Douglas Scott (2010). The concubine, the princess, and the teacher: Voices from the Ottoman Harem, based on Filizten's memoir, Twenty-Eight Years in Çırağan Palace: The Life of Murad V. University of Texas Press. ISBN 9780292718425.
- Bardakçı, Murat (1998). Şahbaba: Osmanoğulları'nın son hükümdarı VI. Mehmed Vahideddin'in hayatı, hatıraları, ve özel mektupları. Pan Yayıncılık. ISBN 978-9-757-65275-5.
