= Murad V =

Sultan of the Ottoman Empire in 1876

- Custodian of the Two Holy Mosques
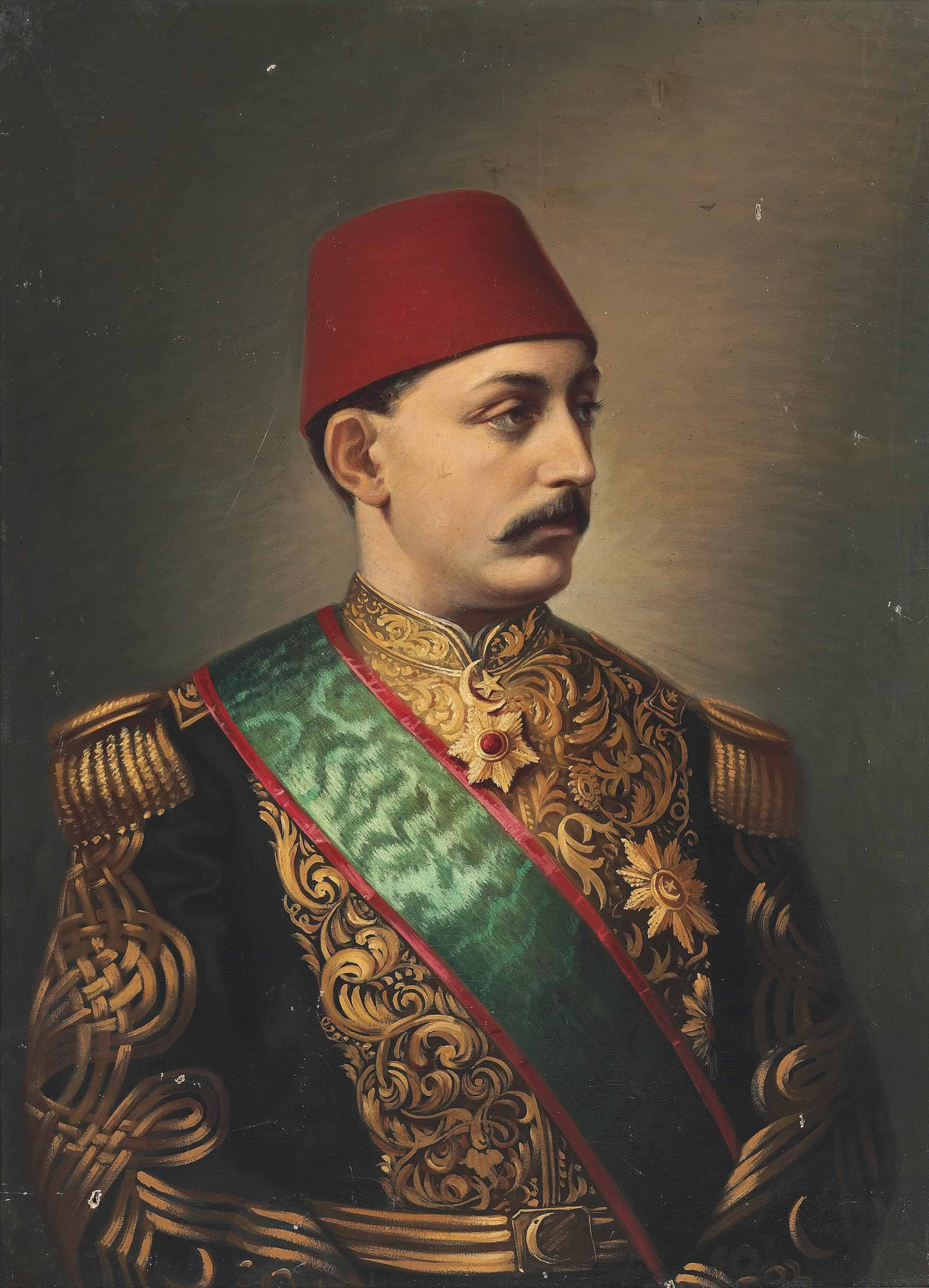

Sultan of the Ottoman Empire (Padishah)
- Reign: 30 May – 31 August 1876
- Predecessor: Abdulaziz
- Successor: Abdul Hamid II
- Grand vizier: Mehmed Rushdi Pasha

Ottoman Caliph (Amir al-Mu'minin)
- Predecessor: Abdulaziz
- Successor: Abdul Hamid II
- Born: 21 September 1840; Çırağan Palace, Constantinople, Ottoman Empire
- Died: 29 August 1904 (aged 63); Çırağan Palace, Constantinople, Ottoman Empire
- Burial: 30 August 1904; New Mosque, Istanbul, Turkey
- Consorts: Mevhibe Kadın; Reftarıdil Kadın; Şayan Kadın; Meyliservet Kadın; Nevdürr Hanım; Gevherriz Hanım; Remzşinas Hanım; Resan Hanım; Filizten Hanım
- Issue: Şehzade Mehmed Selaheddin; Şehzade Süleyman; Hatice Sultan; Şehzade Seyfeddin; Fehime Sultan; Fatma Sultan; Aliye Sultan
Names
- Ottoman Turkish: مراد بن عبدالمجید
- Dynasty: Ottoman
- Father: Abdulmejid I
- Mother: Şevkefza Sultan
- Tughra

Murad V (Ottoman Turkish: مراد خامس, romanized: Murâd-ı ḫâmis; Turkish: V. Murad; 21 September 1840 – 29 August 1904) was the sultan of the Ottoman Empire from 30 May to 31 August 1876. The son of Abdulmejid I, he supported the conversion of the government to a constitutional monarchy. His uncle Abdulaziz had succeeded Abdulmejid to the throne and had attempted to name his own son as heir to the throne, which spurred Murad to participate in Abdulaziz's overthrow. But his own frail physical and mental health made his reign unstable, and Murad V was deposed in favor of his half-brother Abdul Hamid II after only 93 days.

== Biography ==
=== Early life ===
Murad V was born as Şehzade Mehmed Murad on 21 September 1840 in the Çırağan Palace in Constantinople. His father was Sultan Abdulmejid I, son of Sultan Mahmud II and Bezmiâlem Sultan. His mother was Şevkefza Sultan, an ethnic Georgian.

In September 1847, aged seven, he was ceremoniously circumcised together with his younger half-brother, Şehzade Abdul Hamid.

Murad was educated in the palace. His tutors included Toprik Süleyman Efendi, who taught him the Quran, Ferrik Efendi, who taught him Ottoman Turkish language, Sheikh Hafız Efendi, who taught him Hadith (the traditions of Muhammad), Monsieur Gardet, who taught him French, and Callisto Guatelli and Italian Lombardi, who taught him to play piano.

=== Crown prince ===
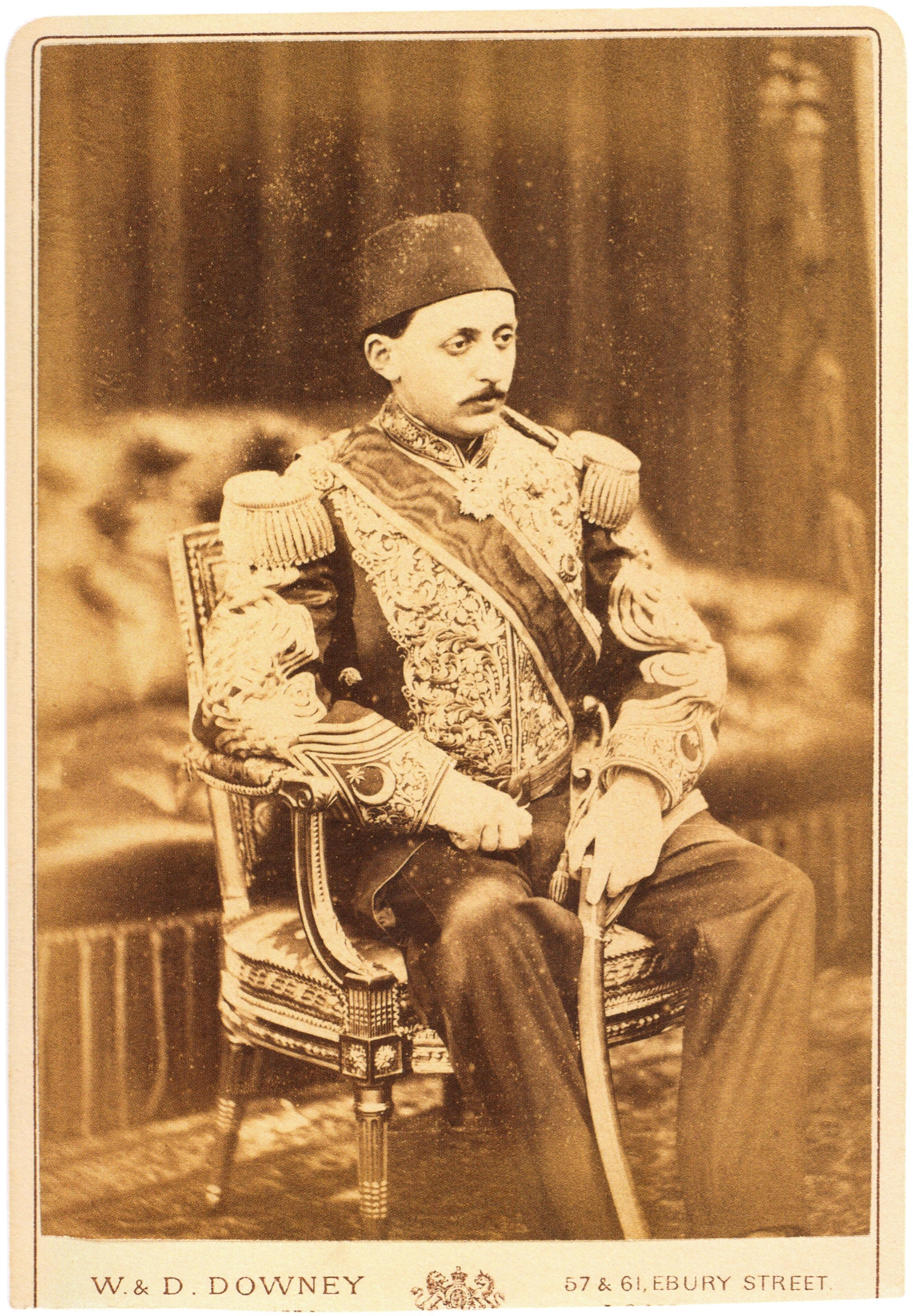
Crown Prince Murâd during his uncle's visit to Europe, Balmoral Castle, 13 July 1867 (photograph: W. & D. Downey).

After Abdulaziz ascended the throne after the death of Sultan Abdulmejid in 1861, Murad became the heir to the throne. He spent most of his time at his farmhouse in Kurbağalıdere which Abdulaziz had allocated to him. His family used to spend their winters in the crown prince's apartments located in the Dolmabahçe Palace and the Nisbetiye Mansion.

He participated in the visits of Abdulaziz to Egypt in 1863 and to Europe in 1867. While he was appreciated by the European rulers for his kindness, his uncle, who was uncomfortable with this, had planned to send him back to Istanbul. Napoleon III and Queen Victoria showed greater interest in Murad than in Abdulaziz. Moreover, special invitations and excursions were organized for the crown prince.

He frequently communicated with the New Ottomans, who wanted a constitutional regime. Şinasi, whom he met frequently, exchanged ideas with Namık Kemal and Ziya Pasha on constitutionalism, democracy and freedom. Through Ziya Pasha and his private physician Kapoleon Efendi, he also communicated with Midhat Pasha, the leading statesman of the Tanzimat era and leader of the Young Ottomans, which was dissatisfied with Sultan Abdulaziz's rule.

Murad was the first member of the Ottoman dynasty to become a member of the Grand Lodge of Free and Accepted Masons of Turkey. On 20 October 1872, Murad was secretly inducted into the lodge, sponsored by his chamberlain Seyyid Bey. Murad rose through the ranks in the lodge. At one point he proposed establishing an independent Ottoman lodge to be named Envar-ı Şarkiye, "Eastern Lights", with its ritual conducted in Turkish, but the plan was never realized.

==== Succession question ====
Sultan Abdulaziz tried to change the succession system in favor of his own son Şehzade Yusuf Izzeddin. For this purpose Abdulaziz set out to mollify different pressure groups and have his son gain popularity among them. During the 1867 visit to Europe, rumors spread that contrary to the rules of protocol Abdulaziz arranged Izzeddin's reception in Paris and London before the official heir, Prince Murad. When the conservative Mahmud Nedim Pasha became the grand vizier in September 1871, he lent his support to Abdulaziz's plans. To further legitimize his plans, Abdulaziz tactically supported a change to primogeniture in the Muhammad Ali dynasty of Egypt. By granting primogeniture to Isma'il Pasha in 1866, Abdulaziz was clearly seeking to create a positive climate of opinion about a change in favour of his own son.

=== Reign ===
==== Accession ====
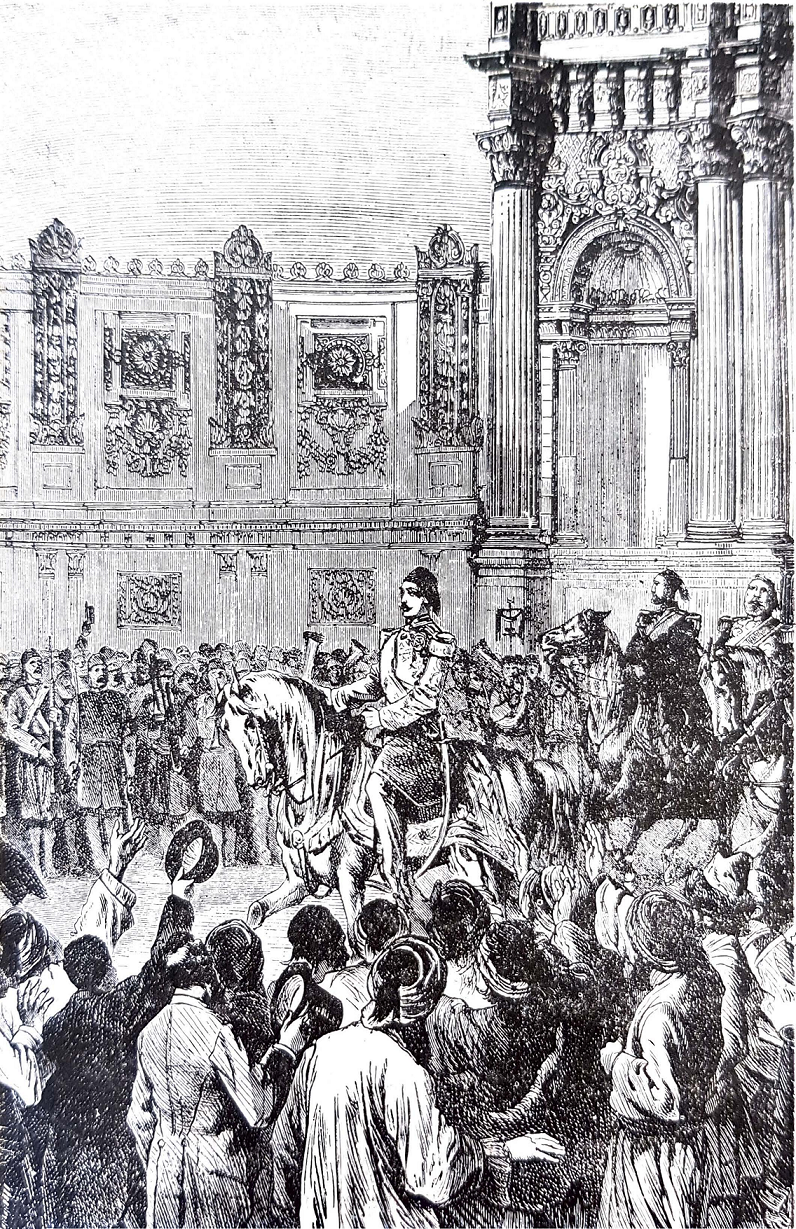
Murad en route to be crowned

As a result, Murad cooperated with the constitutionalist circles and took part in the deposition of Abdulaziz. On the night of 29–30 May 1876, the committee led by Midhat Pasha and the Minister of War, Hüseyin Avni Pasha, deposed Abdulaziz and raised Murad to the throne.

Though Murad acceded to the throne, he was not able to retain it. He struggled to appear normal in his new role, so at odds with his previously quiet life of dabbling in music. His weak nerves, combined with alcoholism, led to a mental breakdown. His deposed uncle's death, only days after Murad's accession, stunned him, and, along with the distress over the abruptness with which he was brought to the throne as well as the demands put upon him as ruler, led to anxious thoughts that the world would interpret his uncle's death as something he had ordered.

==== Illness and deposition ====
Murad began to manifest bizarre behavior that preceded his complete collapse. The government leaders called in the Viennese specialist in psychiatric disorders, Max Leidesdorf, who concluded that Murad could make a complete recovery with three months' treatment in a clinic, which the other Ottoman leaders were unwilling to attempt. A mentally competent prince on the throne formed an essential component of their plans to implement reforms with due legitimacy. Murad's younger brother and heir to the throne, Abdul Hamid, however, appeared both physically and mentally healthy, and supported their plans to introduce parliamentary government to the Empire.

Securing a sanction by Şeyhülislam of Murad's dethronement, as well as Abdul Hamid's promise to proclaim a constitution, Midhat Pasha and the Ottoman government deposed Murad on 31 August 1876, on the grounds of mental illness. His reign had lasted for only 93 days. His younger half-brother ascended to the throne and was crowned Sultan Abdul Hamid II. Murad was confined to the Çırağan Palace, not being permitted to leave the palace grounds on Abdul Hamid's orders.

=== Confinement ===
In confinement, Murad's consort Gevherriz Hanım worked with Nakşifend Kalfa, the hazinedar Dilberengiz, the eunuch Hüseyin Ağa, and Hüsnü Bey (who had been Second Secretary of Murad) to allow for a British physician to meet with Murad to ascertain Murad's mental fitness. When the physician arrived, Gevherriz served as translator. It is not clear how true this story is, and it is possible the physician was sent by freemasons rather than by the British.

In 1877, some nine months into confinement, Murad regained his mental faculties. The first two years of his confinement in Çırağan witnessed three attempts by supporters to free him and restore him to the throne, but all three resulted only in Abdul Hamid's tightening the cordon that isolated Çırağan Palace from the city around it.

==== Ali Suavi incident ====
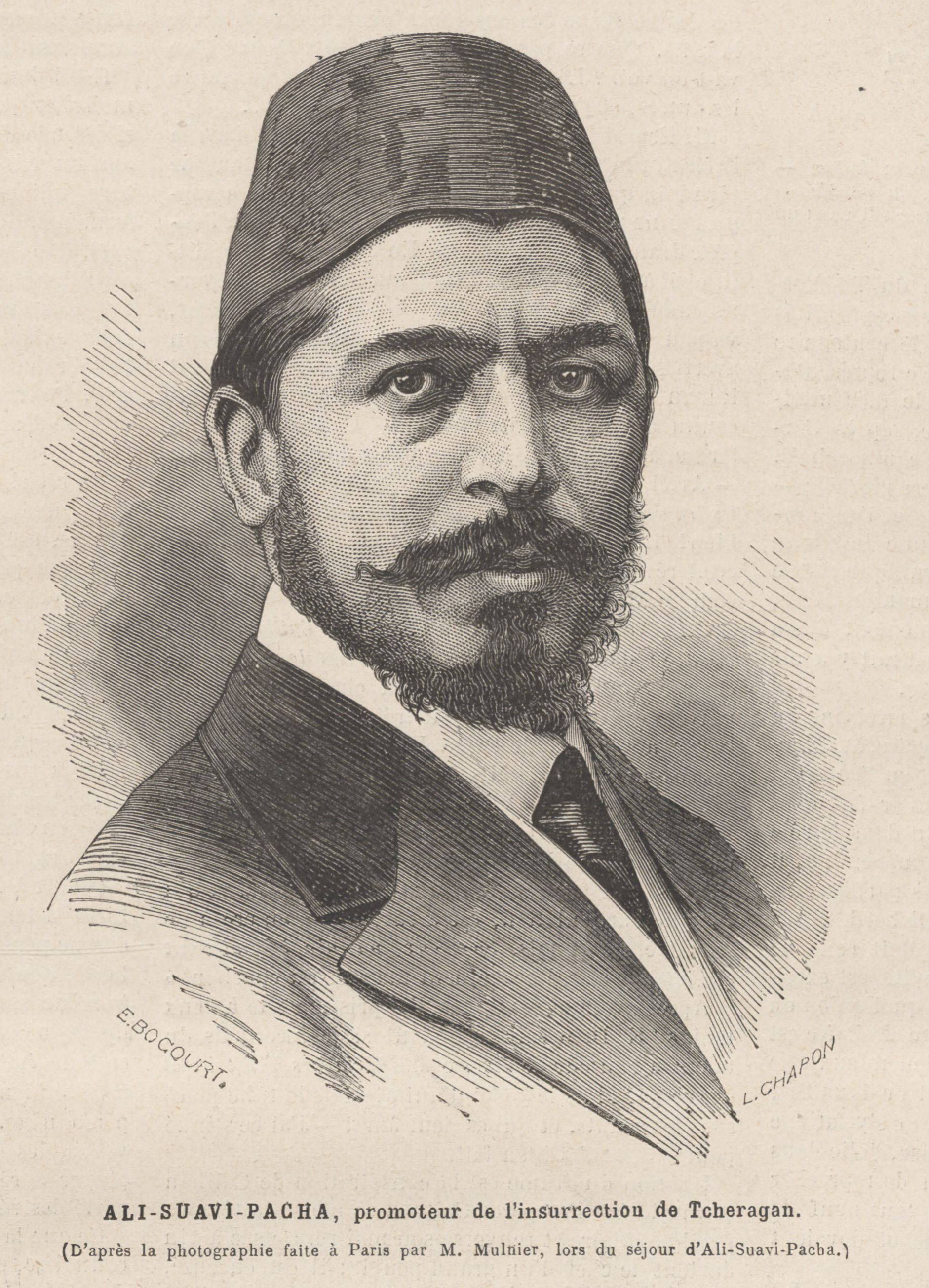
Ali Suavi, an Ottoman political activist, journalist, educator, theologian and reformer, involved in the incident

On 20 May 1878, an attempt was made to liberate Murad from the Çırağan Palace and restore him to the throne. Murad's brothers, Şehzade Ahmed Kemaleddin and Şehzade Selim Süleyman, and sisters, Fatma Sultan and Seniha Sultan, and her husband Mahmud Celaleddin Pasha were involved in the plot. They all wanted to see Murad regain the throne. During the incident, Ali Suavi, a radical political opponent of Abdul Hamid's authoritarian regime, stormed the palace with a band of armed refugees from the recent Russo-Turkish War. The Ottoman battleship Mesudiye was anchored offshore the palace to take Murad and announce his accession. But he did not reach the ship, and Ali Suavi's men were unable to overcome the Beşiktaş police prefect Hacı Hasan Pasha's fierce resistance. The plot failed, and Ali Suavi and most of his men were killed. According to İngiliz Said Pasha, moments before his death, Ali Suavi took Murad's arm and said to him, "O our Lord, come, deliver us from the Muscovites." ("Aman efendimiz, gel bizi Moskoflardan ḫalâṣ et.") In the aftermath, security at the Çırağan Palace was tightened.

==== Life in confinement ====
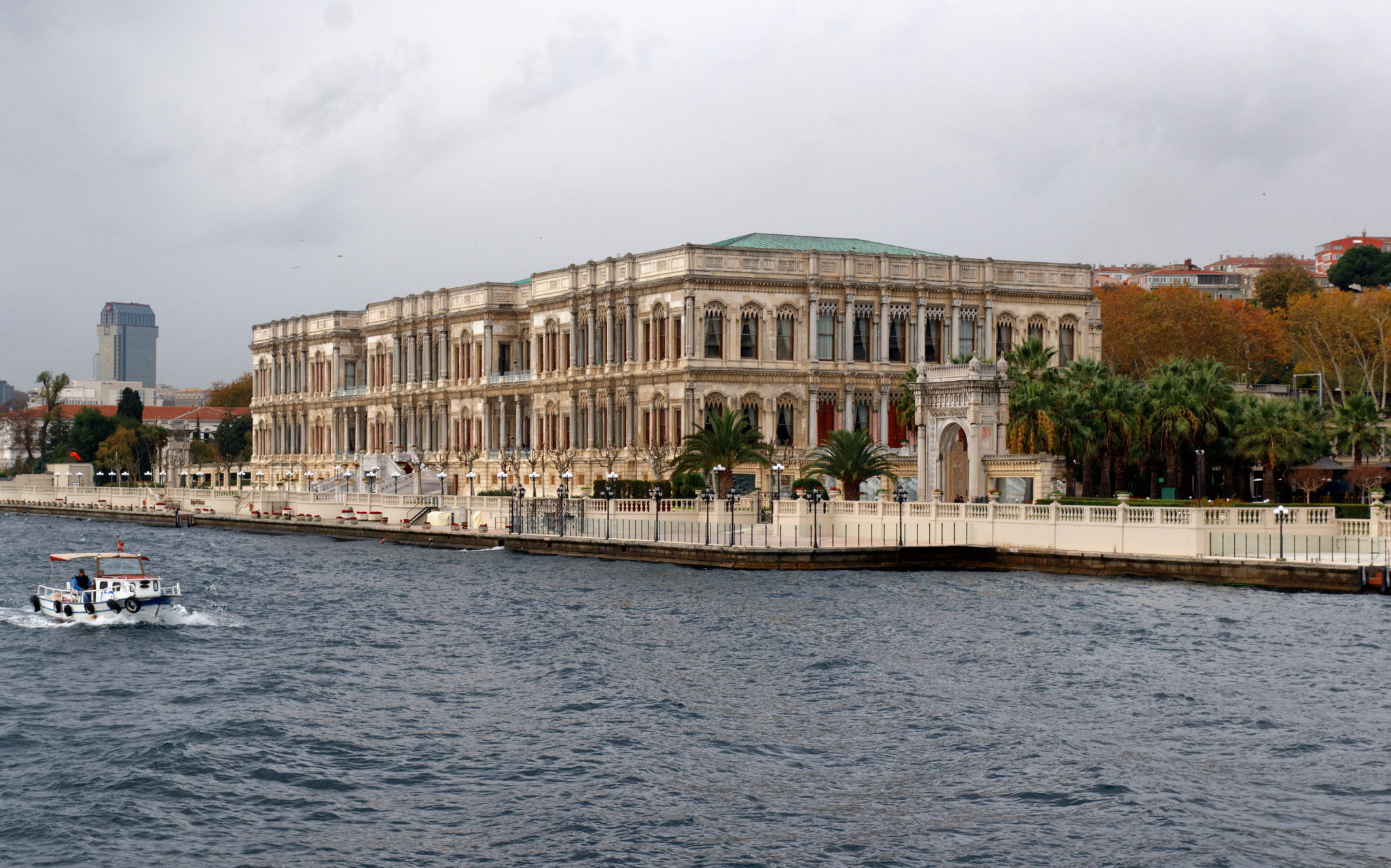
Çırağan Palace, where Murad and his family were confined by Sultan Abdul Hamid for twenty-eight years until Murad's death in 1904

His mental faculties restored, Murad lived out a far more benign existence than that attributed to him by the Western press. Reports through the years claimed that he languished in prison, or escaped and was hiding, or lectured his brother on the Armenian troubles.

After his mother's death in 1889, Murad focused all his love and attention on his children. Selaheddin became his companion in grief, and the two of them passed long hours together reminiscing and speculating about the future. For a time, they took an interest in the Mesnevi, taking great pleasure in reciting verses from it.

=== Death and legacy ===
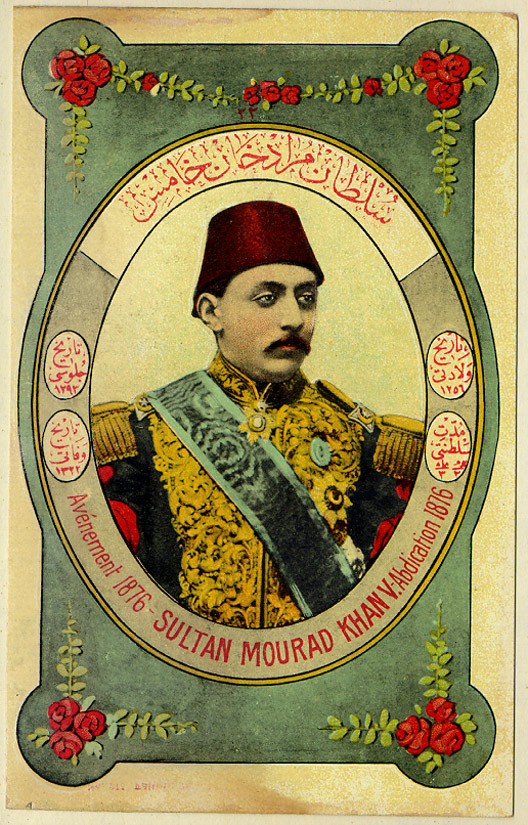
Poster produced after his death

At length, suffering from diabetes, Murad died at the Çırağan Palace on 29 August 1904. While his senior consort Mevhibe Kadın and his son Selahaddin reported that Murad wished to be buried in the mausoleum of Yahya Efendi, Abdul Hamid did not approve of it. The next day, Murad's funeral was carried out without announcement and ceremony. His body was washed and shrouded in the Topkapı Palace and then taken to the Hidayet Mosque in Bahçekapı. After the funeral procession, he was buried next to his mother, Şevkefza, in the New Mosque, Istanbul.

An important primary source about his life is the memoirs of one of his consorts, Filizten Hanım, written in the 1930s.

=== State Honours ===
- Order of the Medjidie, Jeweled, 23 February 1867

== Personal life ==
=== Personality ===
Murad learned both French and Arabic. He ordered and read books and magazines from France and was influenced by French culture. He played the piano and composed Western-style music. He was a liberal.

=== Family ===
Murad V's family is known to have spent nearly 30 years confined to Çırağan Palace, from Murad's deposition in June 1876 to his death in August 1904.

==== Consorts ====
Murad V had nine consorts:

- Elaru Mevhibe Kadın (6 August 1835 – 21 February 1936). BaşKadin. Georgiana, she grew up among the daughters of Sultan Abdülmejid I, Murad's father. She had no known children. After Murad's death, she settled in Şişli and after the English occupation of Istanbul she retired to private life - she never again left home and spent her days taking care of her garden until her death.
- Reftarıdil Kadın (1838 – 3 March 1936). Second Kadın. Circassian of the Hatko family. She gave birth to a son.
- Şayan Kadın (4 January 1853 – 15 March 1945). Third Kadın. She was born Princess Safiye Zan in Anapa. She gave birth to a daughter.
- Meyliservet Kadın (21 October 1859 – 9 December 1891). Fourth Kadın. Before marrying Murad, she had been in the service of his half-sister Refia Sultan. She gave birth to a daughter. She died before Murad and therefore never left Çırağan Palace.
- Resan Hanım (28 March 1860 – 31 March 1910). BaşIkbal. Georgiana, she was born as Ayşe Hanim in Artivin. Before marrying Murad, she had been in the service of his half-sister Seniha Sultan. She gave birth to two daughters.
- Gevherriz Hanım (1863–1940). Second Ikbal, called also Cevherriz Hanım. Circassian, born in Sochi. Before she became a consort, she had been a Kalfa (girl servant) She had no known children. After Murad's death, she remarried, but the marriage was an unhappy one.
- Nevdürr Hanım (1861–1927). Third Ikbal. Born in Batumi. She had no known children. After Murad's death, she was denied a salary and she lived with her stepdaughter Hatice Sultan, and when Hatice was exiled in 1924 she fell into total poverty.
- Remzşinas Hanım (1864 – after 1934). Fourth Ikbal. Circassian. She had no known children.
- Filizten Hanım (1862–1945). Fifth Ikbal. She had no known children.

==== Sons ====
Murad V had three sons:

- Şehzade Mehmed Selaheddin (5 August 1861 – 29 April 1915) – with Reftadiril Kadın. The eldest child and the only surviving son, he was born when Murad was still Şehzade. He had seven consorts, eight sons and eight daughters.
- Şehzade Süleyman (1866–1866) – unknown motherhood.
- Şehzade Seyfeddin (1872–1872) – unknown motherhood.

==== Daughters ====
Murad V had four daughters:

- Hatice Sultan (5 April 1870 – 13 March 1938) – with Şayan Kadın. Born when Murad was Şehzade. She was married twice and had two sons and two daughters.
- Fehime Sultan (2 July 1875 – 15 September 1929) – with Meyliservet Kadın. She married twice, with no children.
- Fatma Sultan (19 June 1879 – 20 November 1932) – with Resan Hanım. She married once and had four sons and a daughter.
- Aliye Sultan (24 August 1880 – 17 September 1903) – with Resan Hanım. Her untimely death, together with the scandal involving Hatice Sultan the next year, definitively undermined Murad's health, and he died in mid-1904.

== In popular culture and literature ==
- In the 2011 TV series Kirli Oyunlar, Murad V is portrayed by Turkish actor Sezgin Erdemir.
- In the 2012, on 3 May, world premiere for the ballet "Murad V" took place in Ankara Opera House. The biographical libretto focuses on the psychology of Murad V and uses some of the works composed by himself.
- In the 2012 movie The Sultan's Women, Murad V is portrayed by Turkish actor Serhat Kaplan.
- In the 2015 TV series Filinta, Murad V is portrayed by Turkish actor Uğur Uludağ.
- In the 2017 TV series Payitaht: Abdülhamid, Murad V is portrayed by Turkish actor Nevzat Yılmaz.
- Murad is a character in Ayşe Osmanoğlu's historical novel The Gilded Cage on the Bosphorus (2020).

== See also ==
- Liberalism in Turkey

== Sources ==
- Brookes, Douglas Scott (2010). The Concubine, the Princess, and the Teacher: Voices from the Ottoman Harem. University of Texas Press. ISBN 978-0-292-78335-5.
- Sakaoğlu, Necdet (2015). Bu Mülkün Sultanları. Alfa Yayıncılık. ISBN 978-6-051-71080-8.
- Satı, İbrahim (2020). Sultan V.Murad'ın Hayatı ve Kısa Saltanatı (1840-1904) (Master Thesis). Karamanoğlu Mehmetbey University Institute of Social Sciences.
- Uluçay, M. Çağatay (2011). Padişahların kadınları ve kızları. Ötüken. ISBN 978-9-754-37840-5.
- Zachs, Weismann; Weismann, Itzchak (2005). Ottoman Reform and Muslim Regeneration. I.B. Tauris. ISBN 978-1-850-43757-4.

Murad V House of Osman Born: 21 September 1840 Died: 29 August 1904
Regnal titles
Preceded by Abdulaziz	Sultan of the Ottoman Empire; 30 May 1876 – 31 August 1876	Succeeded by Abdul Hamid II
Sunni Islam titles
Preceded by Abdulaziz	Caliph of the Ottoman Caliphate; 30 May 1876 – 31 August 1876	Succeeded by Abdul Hamid II
