= Mevhibe Kadın =

Consort of Ottoman Sultan Murad V

Baş Kadın of the Ottoman Empire (Chief Consort)
- Tenure: 30 May - 31 August 1876
- Predecessor: Dürrinev Kadın
- Successor: Nazikeda Kadın
- Born: 6 August 1835; Tiflis, Caucasus Viceroyalty, Russian Empire (now Tbilisi, Georgia)
- Died: 21 February 1936 (aged 100); Şişli, Istanbul, Turkey
- Burial: Ortaköy Cemetery
- Spouse: Murad V (m. 1857; died 1904)
Names
- Turkish: Elaru Mevhibe Kadın; Ottoman Turkish: محبہ قادین
- House: Ottoman (by marriage)
- Father: Tarkanişvili Ahmed Bey
- Religion: Sunni Islam

Elaru Mevhibe Kadın (Ottoman Turkish: محبہ قادین; "talent" or "gift"; 6 August 1835 – 21 February 1936) was the First consort and BaşKadin of Sultan Murad V of the Ottoman Empire.

== Early life ==
Mevhibe Kadın was born on 6 August 1835 in Tbilisi, Georgia. She was the daughter of Tarkanişvili Ahmed Bey. In 1839/1840,

Gürcü Hayreddin Pasha, the then governor of Trebizond Eyalet, presented her in the imperial harem. Here her name was changed to Elâru, according to the custom of the Ottoman court. She was brought to the Ottoman court when she was very young, and grew up among the daughters of Sultan Abdülmejid I, father of Murad V.

During the Crimean War, the women of the harem would recite the Quran, and Elâru would participate in it. After the completion of the recitation all of them would say "Amen". She was also a part of the music play, constituted by Şevkefza Kadın for Şehzade Murad, which involved a total of eight girls. But at that time Murad had little interest in music.

== Marriage ==
Elâru married Murad, during the reign of Sultan Abdulmejid I, when he was still a prince on 2 January 1857 in the Dolmabahçe Palace. She was twenty-two years old, while Murad was seventeen years old. She remained childless. After Abdulmejid's death in 1861, and the accession of his brother Sultan Abdulaziz, Murad became the crown prince. The two lived in a mansion in Kurbağalıdere, which was allocated to him by Abdulaziz. They used to spend their winters in the crown prince's apartments located in the Dolmabahçe Palace and the Nisbetiye Mansion. In 1875, Murad renamed her Mevhibe.

After Murad ascended the throne on 30 May 1876, after the deposition of Sultan Abdulaziz, she was given the title of "Senior Kadın". Although Filitzen Hanim, the youngest of Murad V's consorts, thought it very unusual for a childless consort to be granted this title, in reality numerous Senior Consort (or Chief Consort, Senior Kadın or BaşKadin) had filled the role without having children, including Servetseza Kadın, Chief Consort of Abdülmejid I, father of Murad himself. It is therefore likely that Filitzen simply did not know the Ottoman harem custom so well.

Mevhibe has been described as tall, and extremely beautiful, with dark hazel eyes. It has been perceived that she was highly intelligent and perceptive, and that anyone who met her or spoke with her could not help but fall under her bewitching spell.

She was BaşKadin for 93 days, the shortest term in Ottoman history. After reigning for three months, Murad was deposed on 30 August 1876, due to mental instability and was imprisoned in the Çırağan Palace. Mevhibe also followed Murad into confinement. Throughout their imprisonment, she remained completely loyal to her husband. During the nearly twenty years of confinement Mevhibe behaved with great dignity, without ever showing any yielding. It was she who took care of communications with the outside world. He regularly wrote to Sultan Abdülhamid II, sometimes asking for a little something, and he never forgot to thank when he sent small luxuries such as tobacco or exotic fruit. Her apartments were located on the Istanbul side of the palace. At times Murad would move into her apartments. She was also skilled in making clothes that she could have been considered an expert seamstress. Several times she even made clothes for Murad. After Şevkefza Kadın's death in 1889, authority over the harem devolved to Mevhibe, a position appointed by Murad for life.

She was widowed at Murad's death in 1904, after which her ordeal in the Çırağan Palace came to an end. It was she who wrote to Abdülhamid II to communicate the death of his half-brother Murad. Upon his death, Mevhibe stated in her petition written addressing Sultan Abdul Hamid II that despite the doctors' examinations for days and nights for twenty-eight years thanks to Abdul Hamid's protection, mercy and affection, her husband died a natural death.

== Later years and death ==
After Murad's death, Mevhibe settled in the Tarlabaşı Palace. This palace once belonged to Zekiye Sultan, the eldest daughter of Sultan Abdul Hamid II. After the proclamation of the second constitution in 1908, she purchased a home in Şişli, and retreated there to live a life of seclusion, rarely going out. When the British occupied Istanbul she decided never to leave her home again and spent his last years looking after the garden. In 1924 the Ottoman dynasty was exiled, but Mevhibe, as the childless consort of a deceased sultan, was allowed to remain in Istanbul. She died on 21 February 1936, and was buried in a cemetery in Ortaköy. She was 100 years old at the time of her death, and was the longest-lived member of the Ottoman dynasty in history.

== In literature ==
- Mevhibe is a character in Ayşe Osmanoğlu's historical novel The Gilded Cage on the Bosphorus (2020).

== See also ==
- Kadın (title)
- Ottoman Imperial Harem
- List of consorts of the Ottoman sultans

== Sources ==
- Brookes, Douglas Scott (2010). The Concubine, the Princess, and the Teacher: Voices from the Ottoman Harem. University of Texas Press. ISBN 978-0-292-78335-5.
- Sakaoğlu, Necdet (2008). Bu mülkün kadın sultanları: Vâlide sultanlar, hâtunlar, hasekiler, kadınefendiler, sultanefendiler. Oğlak Yayıncılık. ISBN 978-9-753-29623-6.
- Uluçay, Mustafa Çağatay (2011). Padişahların kadınları ve kızları. Ankara: Ötüken. ISBN 978-9-754-37840-5.
- Satı, İbrahim (2020). Sultan V.Murad'ın Hayatı ve Kısa Saltanatı (1840-1904) (Master Thesis). Karamanoğlu Mehmetbey University Institute of Social Sciences.
