= Meyliservet Kadın =

Consort of Ottoman Sultan Murad V

- Born: 21 October 1859; Caucasus
- Died: 9 December 1891 (aged 32); Çırağan Palace, Istanbul, Ottoman Empire
- Spouse: Murad V
- Issue: Fehime Sultan
Names
- Turkish: Meyliservet Kadın; Ottoman Turkish: میل ثروت قادین
- House: Ottoman (by marriage)
- Religion: Sunni Islam

Meyliservet Kadın (Ottoman Turkish: میل ثروت قادین; "worth of beauty"; 21 October 1859 – 9 December 1891) was the fourth consort of Sultan Murad V of the Ottoman Empire.

== Early life ==
Of Circassian origin, Meyliservet was born on 21 October 1859 in the Caucasus. She had an elder sister, who was the wife of the Ottoman ambassador to Rome. Her sister took her along to Italy, and provided her with an excellent education. She learned several languages. After remaining in Italy for more than eight years, the two sisters returned to Istanbul where they lived a lonely life. Meyliservet's elder sister knew Murad V's half-sister Refia Sultan, so she visited her from time to time; during one of her visits she told her just how miserable she was to be living separate from her husband, so Refia Sultan asked her uncle, Sultan Abdülaziz, to recall the ambassador and give him a post in Istanbul, which is exactly what happened. The two sisters went to Refia Sultan to thank her and Meyliservet, who had never been to the palace, liked it so much that she expressed the desire to stay and never leave. The Kalfas were shocked and tried to tell her that she was a city girl and that city girls did not enter palace service, but she swore she would not leave even if she was to be executed for refusing to go. Refia Sultan thought about it and said: "Oh well, what of it. If someone wants to join us, we'll gladly take her in. It really doesn't matter if she's a city girl, let her stay. Give her a room." Refia Sultan took Meyliservet into the palace and had her provided with special training. Meyliservet was therefore an exception among Ottoman ladies: she was neither a slave nor had she been sent to court by her family, but a free woman who remained at court of her own free choice.

== Marriage ==
Some months went by, the holidays came around, and Murad who at the time was the heir apparent, called at his sister's villa in order to pay his respects. Murad had a preference for blond girls, so his sister Refia selected a blond girl for him whom she trained especially for the prince. Her manners were excellent, but Murad did not even notice her: Meyliserver had caught his eye. After the dinner, the orchestra struck up and European music started and people started dancing, Murad summoned Meyliservet and danced with her. When Princess Refia noticed what was happening, she was reluctant to tell her brother that she had groomed the blonde girl for him, so she pulled her other brother Prince Kemaleddin aside and asked him to do so. Prince Kemaleddin approached Prince Murad on some pretext and relayed to him what their sister had said, but he received this reply from Prince Murad: "I don't care for that blonde girl. I'd like our sister to give me the girl I danced with". Refia Sultan sent Meyliservet forthwith to the apartments of the heir, located at the Dolmabahçe Palace, where she married Murad on 8 June 1874. On 2 July 1875, she gave birth to her only child, a daughter, Fehime Sultan. The birth was kept secret until Murad became sultan, because the Ottoman princes were at the time forbidden from having children before ascending the throne, although Murad had already had four, thanks to the favour of his uncle Sultan Abdülaziz.

Murad ascended the throne on 30 May 1876, after the deposition of his uncle Sultan Abdulaziz, Meyliservet was given the title of "Fourth Kadın". After reigning for three months, Murad was deposed on 30 August 1876, due to mental instability and was imprisoned in the Çırağan Palace. Meyliservet and her one-year-old daughter also followed Murad into confinement.

== Death ==
In 1891, Meyliservet Kadın got sick. Later she seemed to have recovered, although she was still weak, but one evening, as her Kalfas (girls servants) gathered around her to read her the novel Hasan the Sailor and her daughter Fehime was playing the piano, a girl, Lebiriz Kalfa, screamed that she had seen a mouse, sparking panic. Fehime even climbed onto the piano. The sudden screaming and scrambling scared Meyliservet. She fainted, culminating in a worsening of her illness. In three days, she lost the ability to speak. On the third day, she made known that she wanted pen and paper. She wrote her testament and showed it to Murad V: "I shall not recover from this illness. I entrust my daughter into your care." She died at Çırağan Palace, the next day, on 9 December 1891, sadly and quietly. Murad suffered much for her death that in the last years of his life he never again took to music with anything near the same enthusiasm that he once had. She died years before Murad and therefore never left Çırağan Palace. She was the only consort to die before Murad.

== Issue ==
Name	Birth	Death	Notes
Fehime Sultan	2 July 1875	15 September 1929	married two times without issue

== In literature ==
- Meyliservet is a character in Ayşe Osmanoğlu's historical novel The Gilded Cage on the Bosphorus (2020).

== See also ==
- Kadın (title)
- Ottoman Imperial Harem
- List of consorts of the Ottoman sultans

== Sources ==
- Brookes, Douglas Scott (January 1, 2010). The Concubine, the Princess, and the Teacher:Voices from the Ottoman Harem. University of Texas Press. ISBN 978-0-292-78335-5.
- Sakaoğlu, Necdet (2008). Bu mülkün kadın sultanları: Vâlide sultanlar, hâtunlar, hasekiler, kadınefendiler, sultanefendiler. Oğlak Yayıncılık. ISBN 978-9-753-29623-6.
- Uluçay, M. Çağatay (2011). Padişahların kadınları ve kızları. Ötüken. ISBN 978-9-754-37840-5.
