= Fehime Sultan =

Ottoman princess, daughter of Murad V and Meyliservet Kadın

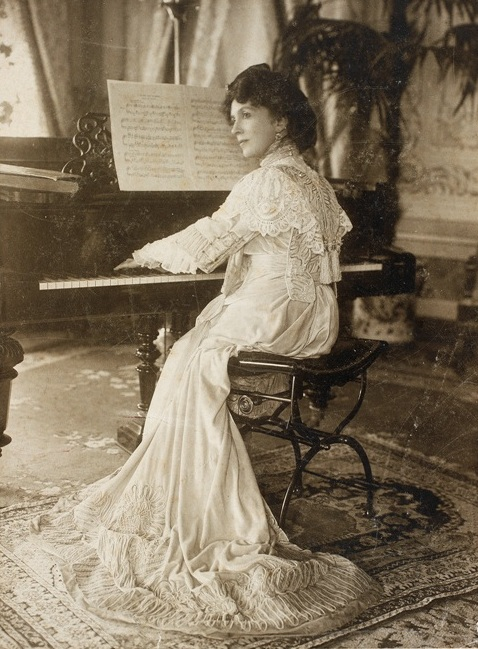
- Fehime Sultan c. 1912
- Born: 2 July 1875; Dolmabahçe Palace, Istanbul, Ottoman Empire
- Died: 15 September 1929 (aged 54); Nice, France
- Burial: Cemetery of the Sulaymaniyya Takiyya, Damascus, Syria
- Spouses: Damat Ali Galib Pasha (m. 1901; div. 1911); Damat Mahmud Behçet Bey (m. 1911)
- Dynasty: Ottoman
- Father: Murad V
- Mother: Meyliservet Kadın
- Religion: Sunni Islam

Fehime Sultan (Ottoman Turkish: فہیمه سلطان; 2 July 1875 – 15 September 1929) was an Ottoman princess, the daughter of Sultan Murad V and his fourth consort Meyliservet Kadın.

== Early life ==
Fehime Sultan was born on 2 July 1875 in the Dolmabahçe Palace. Her father was Murad V, son of Abdulmejid I and Şevkefza Kadın, and her mother was Meyliservet Kadın. She was the fifth child, and second daughter born to her father and the only child of her mother. Her birth was kept secret for almost a year, until his father became Sultan, the Ottoman princes being forbidden to have children at the time.

Upon Murad's accession to the throne on 30 May 1876, after the deposition of his uncle Sultan Abdulaziz, her family settled in the Dolmabahçe Palace. After reigning for three months, he was deposed on 30 August 1876, due to mental instability and was imprisoned in the Çırağan Palace. Fehime and her mother followed him into confinement.

== Life in confinement ==
At the time of her family's confinement, Fehime Sultan was one-year-old and she grew up without knowing any other life. Receiving her education in the palace, like her father, Fehime was interested in the arts and music, and learned the piano and composed songs. According to Filizten Hanım, who did not loved her, Fehime had too simple, haughty and proud personality and she thought herself terribly important. She was not particularly pretty but she fancied herself so and wanted everyone else to think so too. Above all she loved to be praised. She showed little inclination to read books despite the fact that she could read and write both Turkish and French. Instead she spent most of her time gazing into the mirror. Filizten constantly and negatively compared her to Fehime's older sister Hatice, whom Filizten loved and judged instead beautiful, intelligent, cheerful and full of quality. Fehime lost her mother at around sixteen, due to a brief illness that got worse due to an accident. At the time of death, Meyliservet recommended Fehime to her father's care.

== First marriage ==
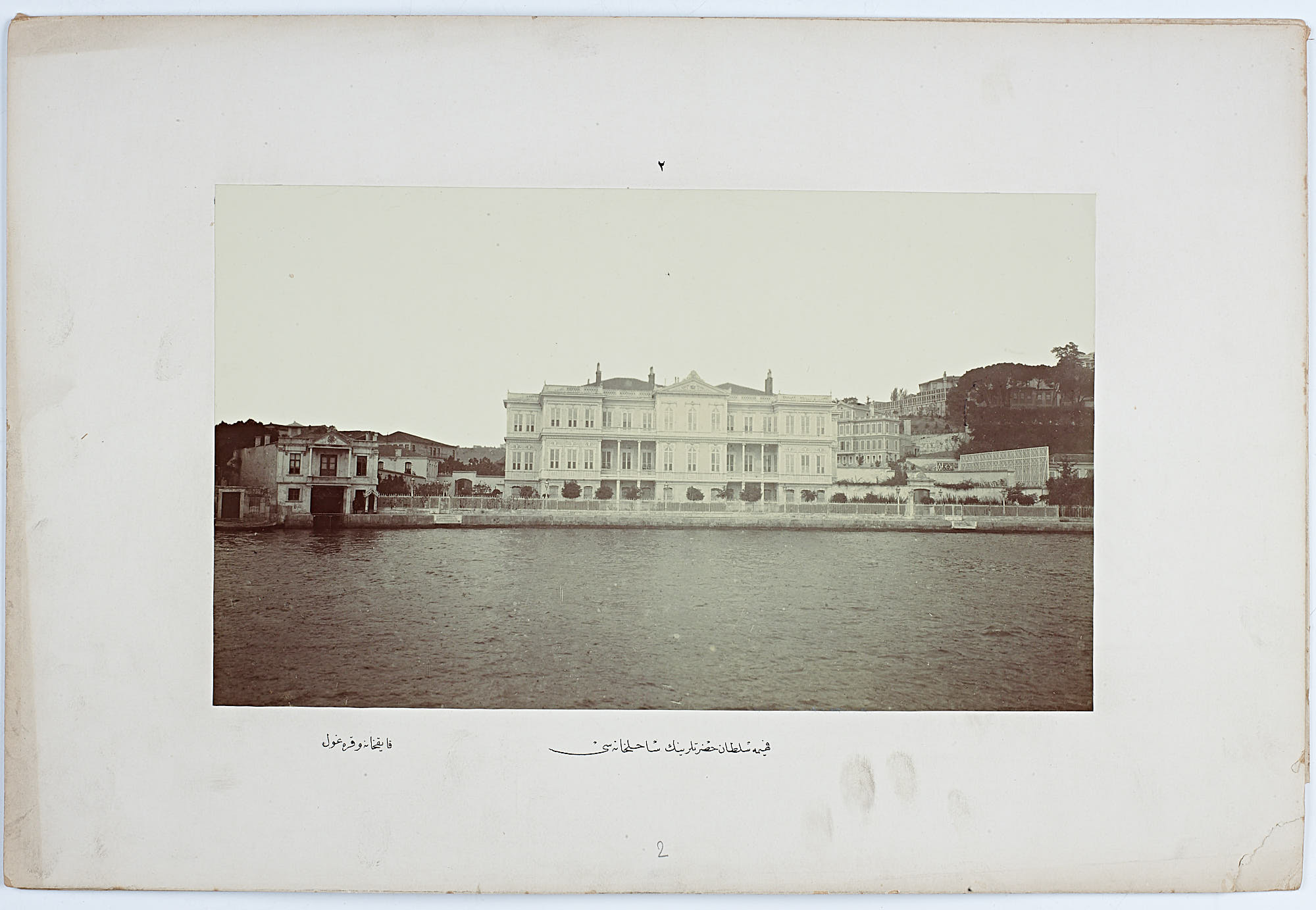
Fehime Sultan Yalı in a contemporary photograph from the Abdul Hamid Archives

As years passed and her elder sister Hatice Sultan matured into a fully grown woman, she quite openly longed for a husband. At length, her complaints came to her father's attention, thanks to her mother and the older Kalfas. Murad had her complaints sent to Abdul Hamid II. The latter consider it his duty to find husbands for Fehime and her sister, but on one condition, that once they leave the palace, they may not return.

With that, the Princesses were asked what they wished to do. Both preferred to leave Çırağan Palace and get married. Abdul Hamid had the two Princesses brought up to Yıldız Palace. He ordered one of the villas at Ortaköy to be completely renovated and another new villa to be built. He had them completely furnished, then ordered photographs taken of them and sent the photographs to Murad. Fehime, who had never left the palace, was frightened when she saw the carriage and horses sent for them.

In October 1898, Fehime and her sister Hatice Sultan met with the German Empress Augusta Victoria of Schleswig-Holstein, when the latter visited Istanbul with her husband the German emperor Wilhelm II. At that time the two were living at Yıldız Palace. Abdul Hamid realized that if he introduced his own daughters to the Empress but didn't include them they would feel quite hurt, so he had them participate in the ceremony as well.

In 1901, Abdul Hamid arranged her marriage together with her sister Hatice Sultan, and Sultan Abdulaziz's daughter Emine Sultan, to another man of the same station and character as Hatice's husband, who was granted a rank as "Ali Galib Pasha". The marriage took place on 3 September 1901 in the Yıldız Palace. He became a Damat. The couple were given one of the palaces of Ortaköy as their residence. She remained childless and the marriage was unhappy, despite the fact that her husband, who was in love, tried in every way to make his wife happy and spent a lot of money to satisfy her every wish. Amongst circles her nickname was Kelebek Sultan (Butterfly Princess), because of her outlandish art and expensive clothing styles.

== Second marriage ==
In 1909, after the scandal and divorce of her sister Hatice, Fehime was finally able to get permission to divorce. In the same year, in an Istanbul garden, she met and fell in love with Mahmud Behçet Bey, who was five years younger than her. In 1910, they married. He became a Damat. They were happily married for 14 years, but had no children.

Starting late in 1920, the then Ankara government organized two intelligence organizations based in Istanbul, the Müdafaa-i Milliye Grubu (Mim Mim group, National Defense Group), which brought together the remnants of the Karakol or Teşkilatı group which had been effectively suppressed by the second British occupation of the Ottoman capital, and the Felah group which was an entirely new and separate oranganization, established to keep an eye on the former Unionists as to smuggle arms, people, and to gather information. Fehime and her cousin, Naime Sultan, daughter of Sultan Abdul Hamid II, were active members of the organization. Fehime was a particularly valuable source of information to the underground. She had no love for her uncle, Sultan Mehmed VI, who had kept the children of Sultan Murad under close surveillance. She was a passionate constitutionalist and a patriot. In 1911, she had composed a piano sonata, entitled "Pour La Constitution".

Upon the exile of the imperial family in March 1924, Fehime and her husband first settled in Vienna, Austria, and later Nice, France. In Nice, Mahmud Behçet Bey borrowed money from Fehime on the pretext of opening a shop. He started selling Turkish style ice cream in front of a grocery store in Rue de Congrés, but in the end he fled, leaving her in poverty. Although several other members of her family lived in Nice, notably Abdülmecid II, they refused to help her, partly because there was discord between the descendants of Sultan Abdulaziz as Abdülmecid II and those of Sultan Abdülmecid I as Fehime, due to the suspicious death of Abdulaziz, which many of his descendants believed was in fact a murder orchestrated by the "Mejid" branch of the family, and partly because they disapproved of Fehime's political views, which they believed were the cause of the downfall of the Sultanate and their exile. Fehime survived only thanks to a few faithful eunuchs, who with their meager possessions helped her at least to eat and have a home.

== Death ==
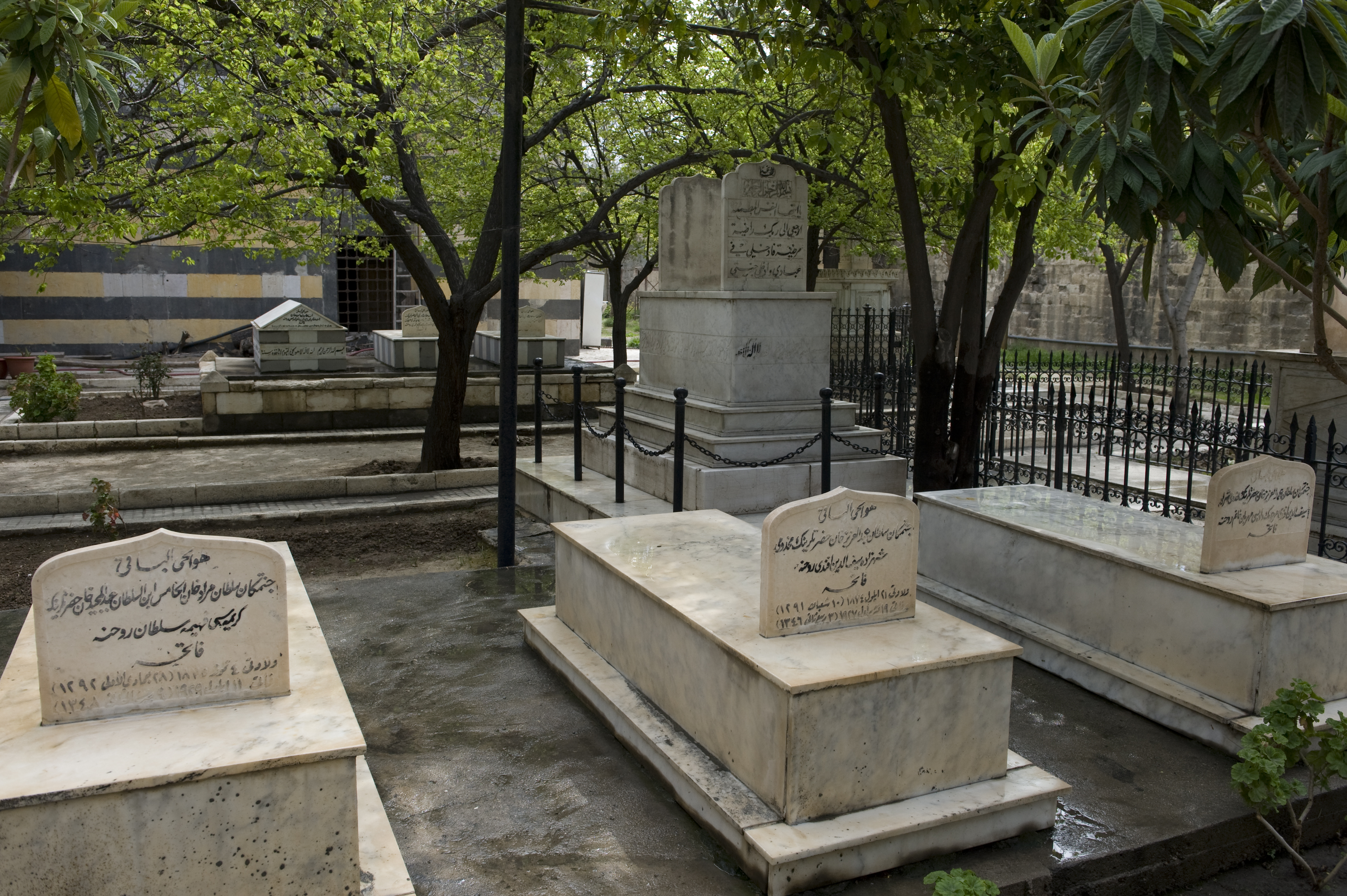
The grave of Fehime Sultan (left)

Fehime died of tuberculosis on 15 September 1929, at the age of fifty-four and was buried in the cemetery of the Sulaymaniyya Takiyya, Damascus, Syria.

== Honours ==
Styles of Fehime Sultan
- Reference style: Her Imperial Highness
- Spoken style: Your Imperial Highness

- Order of the Medjidie, Jeweled
- Order of Charity, 1st Class

== Legacy ==
Dresses attributed to her are preserved in the Topkapı Palace.

== In popular culture and literature ==
- In the 2017 TV series Payitaht: Abdülhamid, Fehime Sultan is portrayed by Turkish actress Elif Özkul.
- Fehime Sultan is a character in Ayşe Osmanoğlu's historical novel The Gilded Cage on the Bosphorus (2020).

== Sources ==
- Brookes, Douglas Scott (2010). The Concubine, the Princess, and the Teacher: Voices from the Ottoman Harem. University of Texas Press. ISBN 978-0-292-78335-5.
- Sakaoğlu, Necdet (2008). Bu mülkün kadın sultanları: Vâlide sultanlar, hâtunlar, hasekiler, kadınefendiler, sultanefendiler. Oğlak Yayıncılık. ISBN 978-9-753-29623-6.
- Uluçay, Mustafa Çağatay (2011). Padişahların kadınları ve kızları. Ankara: Ötüken. ISBN 978-9-754-37840-5.
