= Emetullah Kadın =

Consort of Ottoman Sultan Ahmed III

Baş Kadın of the Ottoman Empire (Chief Consort)
- Tenure: c. 1703/1704 – 20 September 1730
- Successor: Alicenab Kadın
- Born: ante 1690
- Died: c. 1740; Old Palace, Constantinople, Ottoman Empire
- Burial: Istanbul
- Consort of: Ahmed III
- Issue: Fatma Sultan
- Dynasty: Ottoman
- Religion: Sunni Islam (converted)

Emetullah Banu Kadın (Ottoman Turkish: امت اللہ بانو قادین; died c. 1740) was the chief consort of the Ottoman Sultan Ahmed III. She was his favourite consort and the mother of his firstborn and favourite child, the princess Fatma Sultan.

== Biography ==
Her origins are unknown. She was born before 1690 and entered Ahmed III's harem when he was enthroned, in August 1703. In the harem, she was renamed Emetullah Banu and became Ahmed's first and favourite consort, with the title of (chief consort). Ahmed loved her more than his other consorts, and honoured her with a mosque, a school and a fountain.

On 22 September 1704, Emetullah give birth the firstborn of Ahmed, a daughter, Fatma Sultan, who became Ahmed's favorite child. It is unknown if she had other children.

In 1730, the Tulip Era ended with the Patrona Halil's rebellion and Ahmed was dethroned and imprisoned, with his daughter Fatma and Fatma's husband, the Grand Vizir Ibrahim Pasha. Emetullah, with the other consorts, lost her property and jewels and was confined in the Eski Saray, where she died in 1740. She was buried in Istanbul, near the tomb of Lala Mustafa Pasha or those of Neberf Kalfa, an harem's teacher, and Abdulganf, a muezzin.

== Charities ==
Emetullah was a benevolent and caring woman, very active in charity.

In 1707, Ahmed granted her the income from a bakery in Galata, an inn in Simkeşehan with over 150 rooms, and land on which over 30 shops stood. With the money, Emetullah financed a mosque, a mekteb and a fountain, providing education to 50 children and jobs to about 100 people. In 1728, Emetullah built three more fountains at Ayazma, Imrahor and Üsküdar, earning the praise of the poet Ahmed Nedim. She also had foundations in the holy city of Medina and annually donated 90 gold coins.

Most of the structures were demolished in 1956, when a new road was built between Bayezid Square and Aksaray.

== Issue ==
By Ahmed III, Emetullah had at least a child, a daughter:

- Fatma Sultan (22 September 1704 – 4 January 1733). She was the firstborn and the favourite child of her father. She married twice and had two sons and two daughters with her second husband, the Grand Vizier Ibrahim Pasha. With him, She was the real power during the Tulip Era.
