= Şayan Kadın =

Consort of Ottoman Sultan Murad V

- Born: Safiye Zan; 4 January 1853; Anapa, Russian Empire
- Died: 15 April 1945 (aged 92); Ortaköy, Istanbul, Turkey
- Spouse: Murad V
- Issue: Hatice Sultan
Names
- Turkish: Safiye Şayan Kadın; Ottoman Turkish: صفیه شایان قادین
- House: Ottoman (by marriage)
- Father: Zan Batir Bey
- Religion: Sunni Islam

Safiye Şayan Kadın (Ottoman Turkish: شایان قادین; "pure" and "Worthy; deserving"; 4 January 1853 – 15 March 1945) was the third consort of Sultan Murad V of the Ottoman Empire.

== Biography ==
Şayan Kadın was born on January 4, 1853, in Anapa. Her birth name was Safiye Zan and she was the daughter of Zan Batir Bey. Şayan had been formerly a member of the household of the scholar Sıddık Molla. She entered the service of the Ottoman palace at a young age, and on 5 February 1869 at Dolmabahçe Palace, she became the third consort of Murad V, who was at the time Şehzade. Her exquisite blue eyes, blonde hair, and adorning rose-pink face made her a marvel in the art of feminine loveliness. Murad's love and affection for her made other consorts jealous of her.

After sometime, Şayan became pregnant with her first child. Pertevniyal Sultan sent over her palace midwife to abort the child, because at the time it was forbidden for an Ottoman prince to have children before he became sultan and Murad had already obtained two exceptions to the rule. When the midwife arrived to abort the child, Murad obtained permission from Sultan Abdulaziz for this child to be aborted outside the villa. The pregnant Şayan was taken to the home of Dr. Mehmed Emin Pasha for the abortion, but at Murad's request, the doctor prepared a harmless concoction for her and sent her back to the prince's villa, while reporting to the palace that he had administrated treatment to induce an abortion. Hatice Sultan was born in Murad's villa in Kurbağalıdere on 5 April 1870 and she was brought up concealed in the villa until Murad ascended the throne.

Murad ascended the throne on 30 May 1876, after the deposition of his uncle Sultan Abdulaziz. Şayan was given the title of "Third Kadın". After reigning for three months, Murad was deposed on 30 August 1876, due to mental instability and was imprisoned in the Çırağan Palace. Şayan and her six-year-old daughter followed him into confinement. In 1878, there was a failed attempt to free Murad and restore him to the throne, the Ali Suavi conspiracy, which was organized by some of Murad's half brothers and sisters (Şehzade Selim Süleyman, Şehzade Ahmed Kemaleddin, Fatma Sultan and Seniha Sultan). Afterwards, Abdülhamid II had iron doors and gratings installed on the windows at the Çırağan Palace. Frightened by the noise, Murad sent Şayan to see what was going on. She cried to see the new doors and windows and tried to hide the truth from Murad, telling him they were just fixing the doors, but he went to check and saw for himself.

After Murad's death in 1904, according to Filitzen Hanim caused by pain and shame over the scandal caused by Şayan's daughter, Hatice Sultan, she remained in the Çırağan Palace when every one else had left. She declared that "My master died here, as prisoner, and here I will die too." Until 1908, Resan Hanım, fifth consort, stayed with her, but afterwards, she went to live with her daughter Fatma Sultan and Şayan was left alone. Şayan was very attached to Şehzade Ali Vasıb, who called her her "third grandmother". Princess Leyla Achba met her at a dinner of Caliph Abdülmecid II and was fascinated by her intelligence and kindness. In 1915, the CPU canceled her salary and she fell into poverty. She died during the occupation of Constantinople. After the exile of the Ottoman dynasty, she lived with Reftarıdil Kadın in Ortaköy. She died on 15 March 1945. In her last years, she suffered from senile dementia and was screaming in panic that Abdülhamid II's soldiers were about to break in. She was the last of Murad's consorts to die.

== Issue ==
Name	Birth	Death	Notes
Hatice Sultan	5 April 1870	13 March 1938	married two times, and had issue, two sons and two daughters

== In literature ==
- Şayan is a character in Ayşe Osmanoğlu's historical novel The Gilded Cage on the Bosphorus (2020).

== See also ==
- Kadın (title)
- Ottoman Imperial Harem
- List of consorts of the Ottoman sultans

== Sources ==
- Brookes, Douglas Scott (2010). The Concubine, the Princess, and the Teacher: Voices from the Ottoman Harem. University of Texas Press. ISBN 978-0-292-78335-5.
- Sakaoğlu, Necdet (2008). Bu mülkün kadın sultanları: Vâlide sultanlar, hâtunlar, hasekiler, kadınefendiler, sultanefendiler. Oğlak Yayıncılık. ISBN 978-9-753-29623-6.
- Uluçay, Mustafa Çağatay (2011). Padişahların kadınları ve kızları. Ankara: Ötüken. ISBN 978-9-754-37840-5.
