= Resan Hanım =

Consort of Ottoman Sultan Murad V

- Born: Ayşe Hanım; 28 March 1860; Artvin, Ottoman Empire (now Artvin, Turkey)
- Died: 31 March 1910 (aged 50); Constantinople, Ottoman Empire (now Istanbul, Turkey)
- Burial: Mehmed Ali Pasha Mausoleum, Eyüp Cemetery, Istanbul
- Spouse: Murad V (m. 1877; died 1904)
- Issue: Fatma Sultan; Aliye Sultan
Names
- Turkish: Ayşe Resan Hanım; Ottoman Turkish: عائشه رسان خانم
- House: Ottoman (by marriage)
- Father: Ömer Bey
- Mother: Fatma Hanım
- Religion: Sunni Islam

Resan Hanım (Ottoman Turkish: رسان خانم, "softness" or "bright"; 28 March 1860 – 31 March 1910) was a consort of Sultan Murad V of the Ottoman Empire.

== Biography ==
Resan Hanım was born on 28 March 1860 in Artvin in the Caucasus. She was Georgian, daughter of Ömer Bey and Fatma Hanım, and had two sisters, Şayeste Hanım and Rabia Gülten Hanım. Her real name was Ayşe Hanim. She and her sisters were sent to Istanbul as (enslaved) ladies-in-waiting for Seniha Sultan, Murad V's half-sister. Resan was chosen by Seniha as a consort for Murad and she was presented to Murad by the Senior Kalfa as a gift on the occasion of his accession to the throne. After his deposition, she followed him into confinement in the Çırağan Palace.

She married Murad on 2 November 1877 in the Çırağan Palace when Murad was thirty-seven years old and Resan was seventeen years old, a year after Murad and his family's imprisonment in the palace began. On 19 June 1879, a year after the marriage, she gave birth to Fatma Sultan, followed by Aliye Sultan, born on 24 August 1880. Aliye died on 17 September 1903.

She was widowed at Murad's death in 1904, after which her ordeal in the Çırağan Palace came to an end. After Murad's death she stayed for a few years at Çırağan Palace to keep company with Şayan Kadın, Murad's third consort, who had refused to leave the Palace. During the Second Constitutional Era she asked to be allowed to move to Yildiz Palace, but her request was denied. Instead, on 16 December 1908, she was allowed to move in with her daughter Fatma.

She died on 31 March 1910 at the age of fifty because of tuberculosis, and was buried in the mausoleum of Damat Mehmed Ali Pasha in Eyüp Cemetery, Istanbul.

== Issue ==
| Name | Birth | Death | Notes |
|---|---|---|---|
| Fatma Sultan | 19 June 1879 | 20 November 1932 | married once, and had issue, four sons and one daughter |
| Aliye Sultan | 24 August 1880 | 19 September 1903 | unmarried, and without issue |

== In literature ==
- Resan is a character in Ayşe Osmanoğlu's historical novel The Gilded Cage on the Bosphorus (2020).

== See also ==
- Ottoman Imperial Harem
- List of consorts of the Ottoman sultans

== Sources ==
- Uluçay, M. Çağatay (2011). Padişahların kadınları ve kızları. Ötüken. ISBN 978-9-754-37840-5.
- Sakaoğlu, Necdet (2008). Bu Mülkün Kadın Sultanları: Vâlide Sultanlar, Hâtunlar, Hasekiler, Kadınefendiler, Sultanefendiler. Oğlak Yayıncılık. ISBN 978-6-051-71079-2.
- Brookes, Douglas Scott (2010). The Concubine, the Princess, and the Teacher: Voices from the Ottoman Harem. University of Texas Press. ISBN 978-0-292-78335-5.
