= Hazinedar =

Rank in the hierarchy of the Ottoman Empire

Hazinedar or Haznadar (from Persian: خزینه‌دار, lit. 'treasurer' (Note: Etymologically, a compound word originated from the Arabic noun خزینة, lit. 'treasure', and Persian verbal suffixoid -دار, lit. 'holder, owner', i.e. indicating ownership. More etymological info on: Wikt: خزينة, Wikt: دار, and Wikt: -dar. Also: Wikt: hazinedar.)) is a title in Ottoman Empire hierarchy. Depending on the suffix or prefix it had different meanings. The English language translation of the word is a treasurer.

== Treasurer ==
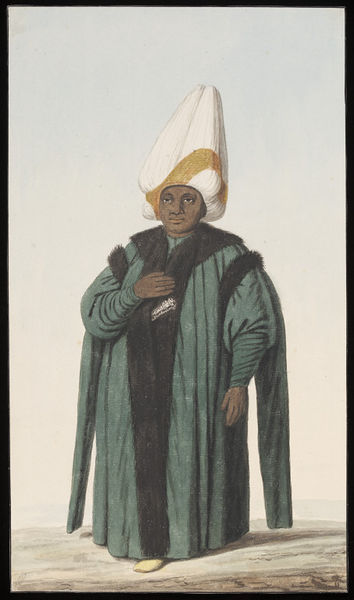
Hazinedar agha

The chief hazinedar headed the personnel of the sultan's treasury. Hazinedars subordinated to the chief hazinedar had a title of hazinedar kalfa. Kalfa is Turkish for 'apprentice'. Hazinedar agha was the title of the chief eunuch treasurer.

== Lord (housemistress) of the sultan's palace and harem ==
The high hazinedar or first hazinedar or hazinedar usta was a title for the housemistress of the sultan's palace, the most influential person after the prince. There were other hazinedars in the Ottoman hierarchy (the second, third...) who were subordinate to the first hazinedar, hence referred to as usta ('superintendent'). Only the first hazinedar could approach the sultan and other nobility, while the second, third and other hazinedars served the first hazenidar.
