= Kadın (title) =

Honorific title

Kadın (Ottoman Turkish: قادین) was a title given to consorts of the sultan of the Ottoman Empire towards the beginning of the seventeenth century. The title came into official usage at the end of the century, and remained in usage until the twentieth century.

== Ranks and titles ==
A kadın was a titled consort, and recognised as such by the sultan. The sultans usually had four kadıns at a time; occasionally, one would die, retired to the Eski Saray (Old Palace), or was divorced. They were ranked as baş kadın (first kadın, first consort), ikinci kadın (second kadın, second consort), üçüncü kadın (third kadın, third consort), and dördüncü kadın (fourth kadın, fourth consort), in order of their elevation to that position.

The kadıns usually held the prefix titles of devletlü ("illustrious"), ismetlü ("virtuous"), iffetlü ("honest"), saadetlü ("prosperous"), and inayetlü ("gracious"), and the suffix titles of kadınefendi ("ladyship"), and hazretleri ("highness").

== Status and promotion ==
The kadıns were chosen from among the gediklis. They had their own apartments within the harem, or sometimes isolated kiosks. In the nineteenth century, they had two rooms on the second floor of the palace, one facing the Bosphorus Strait, and serving as a salon, and the other facing the palace gardens, and serving as a bedroom. They had their personal servants. Each kadın had her night turn (nöbet gecesi). Sometimes she was invited to dine with the sultan, and when this happened in earlier years, she used to sit at a separate table. The sultans came to visit a kadın, namely, if she was sick, or if she had children.

The kadıns were not permitted to receive outside visitors or to leave the palace except to accompany the sultan to another of his abodes. When they left Topkapı Palace for one of the other places, the utmost care was taken to prevent them from being seen. They left the palace before sunrise, were driven through the palace grounds in curtained carriages, and covered with shawls. A long line of imperial carriages would be formed according to protocol. They embarked from Yalı Köşkü on boats in which they were seated in enclosures. The whole convoy was closely guarded by other boats. The kadıns were allowed to join Friday mosque processions if they wished.

Each kadın received an allowance from the state according to her rank. In the eighteenth century the senior kadın was given ten kese, or 5,000 kuruş, while the other kadıns were allocated allowance according to their ranks. In the nineteenth century it was 20,000 kuruş. The kadıns were subjected to the same law of inheritance as the other women in the harem. However, they were usually buried in places of honor. In the nineteenth century, if a kadın died, the laying out of the corpse and the wrapping in the winding sheet took place at the Topkapı Palace.

If the valide sultan were deceased, authority over the harem devolved to the senior kadın.

Upon the death of a kadın, each kadın that ranked below her advanced one step in rank. The ikbals, who ranked below the kadıns, could only take the position of the kadıns if one of them died, or was divorced. If a vacancy arose among the kadıns, the senior ikbal was moved up to kadın status. Upon the death of a sultan, any of his kadıns who had not borne a child, or who had born a child who had died, was married to a statesman. The others retired to the Old Palace.

== List of senior consorts ==
Name	Became senior consort	Ceased to be senior consort	Death	Spouse
Emetullah Kadın	1703 husband's ascension	20 September 1730 husband's abdication	1732	Ahmed III
Alicenab Kadın	20 September 1730 husband's ascension	13 December 1754 husband's death	Unknown	Mahmud I
Leyla Kadın	13 December 1754 husband's ascension	30 October 1757 husband's death	1794	Osman III
Mihrişah Sultan	17 March 1758 promoted to the position	21 January 1774 husband's death	16 October 1805	Mustafa III
Ayşe Kadın	21 January 1774 husband's ascension	1775		Abdul Hamid I
Ruhşah Kadın	1775 fellow consort's death	7 April 1789 husband's death	1807	Abdul Hamid I
Safizar Kadın	7 April 1789 husband's ascension	30 May 1792		Selim III
Unnamed	30 May 1792 fellow consort's death	29 May 1807 husband's deposition	fl. 1858–59	Selim III
Şevkinur Kadın	29 May 1807 husband's ascension	28 July 1808 husband's deposition	1812	Mustafa IV
Fatma Kadın	28 July 1808 husband's ascension	20 April 1809		Mahmud II
Dilseza Kadın	20 April 1809 fellow consort's death	May 1816		Mahmud II
Kameri Kadın	May 1816 fellow consort's death	before 1825		Mahmud II
Nevfidan Kadın	before 1825 fellow consort's death	1 July 1839 husband's death	25 December 1855	Mahmud II
Servetseza Kadın	2 July 1839 husband's ascension	25 June 1861 husband's death	22 September 1879	Abdulmecid I
Dürrünev Kadın	25 June 1861 husband's ascension	30 May 1876 husband's deposition	4 December 1895	Abdulaziz
Mevhibe Kadın	30 May 1876 husband's ascension	31 August 1876 husband's deposition	1936	Murad V
Nazikeda Kadın	31 August 1876 husband's ascension	11 April 1895		Abdul Hamid II
Bedrifelek Kadın	11 April 1895 fellow consort's death	27 April 1909 husband's deposition	6 February 1930	Abdul Hamid II
Kamures Kadın	27 April 1909 husband's ascension	3 July 1918 husband's death	30 April 1921	Mehmed V
Nazikeda Kadın	3 July 1918 husband's ascension	1 November 1922 husband's deposition and empire abolished	4 April 1941	Mehmed VI
Şehsuvar Hanım	19 November 1922 husband's proclaimed as caliph	3 March 1924 husband's deposition and caliphate abolished	1945	Abdulmejid II

== See also ==
- List of Ottoman titles and appellations
- Khatun
- Haseki sultan
- Ikbal (title)
- Valide sultan
- Cariye

== Sources ==
- Argit, Betül Ipsirli (October 29, 2020). Life after the Harem: Female Palace Slaves, Patronage and the Imperial Ottoman Court. Cambridge University Press. ISBN 978-1-108-48836-5.
- Davis, Fanny (1986). The Ottoman Lady: A Social History from 1718 to 1918. Greenwood Publishing Group. ISBN 978-0-313-24811-5.
- Brookes, Douglas Scott (2010). The Concubine, the Princess, and the Teacher: Voices from the Ottoman Harem. University of Texas Press. ISBN 978-0-292-78335-5.
- Peirce, Leslie P. (1993). The Imperial Harem: Women and Sovereignty in the Ottoman Empire. Oxford University Press. ISBN 978-0-195-08677-5.
- Sancar, Asli (2007). Ottoman Women: Myth and Reality. Light, Incorporated. ISBN 978-1-597-84115-3.
