= Filizten Hanım =

Consort of Ottoman Sultan Murad V

- Born: c. 1862
- Died: c. 1945 (aged 82–83); Istanbul, Turkey
- Spouse: Murad V (m. 1885; died 1904)
Names
- Turkish: Filizten Hanım; Ottoman Turkish: فیلیزتن خانم
- House: Ottoman (by marriage)
- Religion: Sunni Islam

Filizten Hanım (Ottoman Turkish: فيليزتن خانم; c. 1862 – c. 1945; meaning "Tendril bodied" or "big eyes") was the last consort of Sultan Murad V of the Ottoman Empire.

== Life ==
Filizten Hanım was born in 1861 or 1862. At Istanbul her name, according to the custom of the Ottoman court, was changed to Filizten. She was of medium height, had blonde hair, was somewhat heavy, and was incomparably beautiful.

Filizten was appointed a "Duty Kalfa", after Murad's accession to the throne on 30 May 1876, after the deposition of his uncle Sultan Abdulaziz. After reigning for three months, he was deposed on 30 August 1876, due to mental instability and was imprisoned in the Çırağan Palace. Filizten was chosen to serve at Çırağan Palace, where she became Murad's last consort. She married Murad after 1883. However, Murad's physical and mental condition had now deteriorated and the marriage was never consummated. She was widowed at Murad's death in 1904, after which her ordeal in the Çırağan Palace came to an end. Filizten accused his daughter Hatice Sultan of Murad's death. The princess was involved in a major scandal at the time, and according to Filizten, the shame and pain of her favorite daughter's behavior had led to Murad, who was already seriously ill, dying.

== Death ==
After Murad's death she was sent to Bursa with his consorts Gevherriz Hanım, Nevdürr Hanım and Remzşinas Hanım. She returned to Istanbul in 1914. At the exile of the imperial family in March 1924, Filizten as being the adjunct member of the family decided to stay in Istanbul, where she died around 1945.

== Memoirs ==
In her seventies, Filizten wrote memoirs, which constituted the majority of the biography of Murad compiled by the journalist and avocational historian Ziya Șakir under the title Çırağan Sarayında 28 sene beşinci Murad'ın hayatı (Turkish for "Twenty-Eight Years in the Çırağan Palace:The Life of Murad V"). She was in excellent health, in complete command of her faculties, and aware of what Ziya Șakir called her responsibility to history in retelling the events she witnessed in Çırağan Palace. The memoir is an oral history by one who witnessed the events of many years earlier. In fact Filizten stated in her memoirs that she did not keep a diary.

Ziya Șakir's idiosyncrasies notwithstanding, the authenticity of the memoir itself has never been in doubt. Immediately after publication it formed a primary source for the articles on Murad V published by the eminent historian İsmail Hakkı Uzunçarşılı, who directly identified the memoir's author as Filizten Hanım, gözde of Murad V. Today it continues to form a primary source for the life of this Sultan in particular, and for life in the late Ottoman palace harem in general.

== In popular culture and literature ==
- In the 2012 Movie The Sultan's Women Filizten is portrayed by a Turkish Actress Deniz Aylan.
- Filizten is a character in Ayşe Osmanoğlu's historical novel The Gilded Cage on the Bosphorus (2020).

== See also ==
- Ottoman Imperial Harem
- List of consorts of the Ottoman sultans

== Sources ==
- Brookes, Douglas Scott (2010). The Concubine, the Princess, and the Teacher: Voices from the Ottoman Harem. University of Texas Press. ISBN 978-0-292-78335-5.
