= Şevkefza Sultan =

Valide Sultan of the Ottoman Empire (1820–1889)

- Valide Sultan
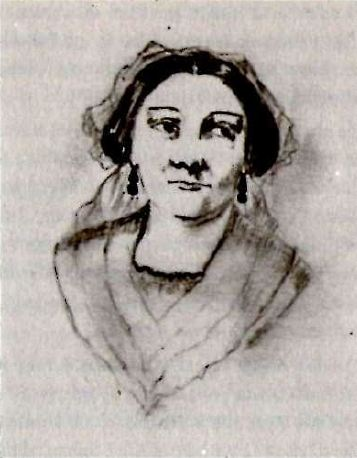

Valide Sultan of the Ottoman Empire
- Tenure: 30 May 1876 – 31 August 1876
- Predecessor: Pertevniyal Sultan
- Successor: Rahime Perestu Sultan
- Born: 12 December 1820; Circassia
- Died: 17 September 1889 (aged 68); Çırağan Palace, Ortaköy, Istanbul, Ottoman Empire
- Burial: New Mosque, Istanbul
- Spouse: Abdulmejid I (m. 1839; died 1861)
- Issue: Murad V Aliye Sultan
Names
- Turkish: Şevkefza Sultan; Ottoman Turkish: شوق افزا قادین
- House: Ottoman (by marriage)
- Religion: Sunni Islam

Şevkefza Sultan (Ottoman Turkish: شوق افزا قادین; Georgian: შეფქევზა სულთანი; 12 December 1820 - 17 September 1889), also known as Şevkefza Kadın, was a consort of Sultan Abdulmejid I of the Ottoman Empire. She held the position of Valide Sultan from 30 May 1876 to 31 August 1876, when her son Şehzade Murad ascended the throne as Murad V.

== Early life ==
Of Mingrelian and Circassian origin, Şevkefza Kadın was born on 12 December 1820 and she was presented at the age of seven during the reign of Sultan Mahmud II, by the first imam, Zeynelabidin Efendi. She served the Sultan for seven or eight years as a dancer in his presence. She was then attached to the entourage of Nurtab Kadın, one of Sultan's consorts.

She has been described as a woman of extraordinary beauty, of medium height, curvy, with black eyes and hair, and very kindly, but not very intelligent, easy to influence and devoid of cunning. Abdülmejid fell in love with her beauty and married her in 1839.

== Marriage ==
Şevkefza married Abdulmejid in on 1 August 1839. She was given the title of "Baş Ikbal". On 21 September 1840, a year after the marriage, she gave birth to her first child, a son, Şehzade Mehmed Murad (later Murad V). On 20 October 1842, she gave birth to her second child, a daughter, Aliye Sultan in the Old Beşiktaş Palace. The princess died at the age of two on 10 July 1845.

In 1843, she was elevated to the title of "Fourth Kadın", in 1845 to the title of "Third Kadın", and in 1849, to the title of "Second Kadın". Charles White, who visited Istanbul in 1843, said the following about her:

The fourth...according to the assertion of the Stambol [Istanbul] ladies, bears away the palm of beauty from all her colleagues, but is not highly accomplished.

During her tenure as a consort she became jealous of Serfiraz Hanim, another consort who had great influence on the sultan, and destroyed her reputation by spreading the rumor that she was having an adulterous affair with a palace guard.

Upon Abdülmejid's death in 1861, she attempted to put their son Murad on the throne as he had wished, bypassing the rightful heir, Abdülmejid's younger half-brother, Abdülaziz. According to the chronicles of her ladies-in-waiting, the attempt was not her idea, because she was devoted to her son but lacked the courage and cunning to devise such a plan, and was instead instigated by Servetseza Kadin, Abdülmejid's first consort who loved Murad as a son, and her handmaid Nakşifend Kalfa. The attempt failed and all three were hated by Pertevniyal Sultan, Abdülaziz's mother, who denied them any request during his reign.

== As Valide Sultan ==
On 30 May 1876, her son Murad ascended the throne as Murad V and she became the Valide Sultan. According to many, she was involved in the events that led to Abdülaziz's deposition.

Her son appointed her reported chief ally, Damat Nuri Pasha, as Lord Pasha, after which Şevkefza and Damat were to have confiscated all the gold coins and jewelry hidden away by Abdülaziz and his mother, the former valide sultan Pertevniyal Sultan, in the harem of Dolmabahçe Palace. The sealed apartments of Pertevniyal were opened and from them eight chests of gold and four chests of debentures were removed. Eight porters were needed to lift each one of the chests with gold. It was said these eight chests contained 5,120 okkas of gold.

== Life in imprisonment ==
After reigning for ninety-three days, Murad was deposed on 31 August 1876 for mental problems, and he and his family were imprisoned in the Çırağan Palace. This made Şevkefza the Valide Sultan with the shortest reign in history. The woman, very devoted to her son and fearing for him, kept protective amulets, talismans and charms in her room with written prayers and supplications for her son's safety.

It is said that Şevkefza was never reconciled to Murad's deposition and that she would have given her life without hesitation to give him back the throne. On the night of the Ali Suavi incident, in 1877, when Murad's partisans tried to reinstate him on the throne, Şevkefza encouraged him to play his part. But Murad was too nervous and upset to head the conspiracy. Given his lack of leadership, the conspiracy never stood a chance of succeeding.

== Death ==
In 1889, a swelling on Şevkefza's neck suddenly began to grow. Her illness lasted some three months, with periods of intense fever. Rifat Pasha made every effort to bring her illness under control, but despite all treatment he was not able to save her. She died on 17 September 1889 at the Çırağan Palace, Ortaköy, Istanbul, and was buried in the mausoleum of the new ladies at the Yeni Mosque.

== Issue ==
Name	Birth	Death	Notes
Murad V	21 September 1840	29 August 1904	33rd Sultan of the Ottoman Empire.
Aliye Sultan	20 October 1842	10 July 1845	born in Beşiktaş Palace; buried in New Mosque

== In literature and popular culture ==
- Şevkefza is a character in Hıfzı Topuz's historical novel Abdülmecit: İmparatorluk Çökerken Sarayda 22 Yıl: Roman (2009).
- In the 2012 movie The Sultan's Women Şevkefza Kadın is portrayed by Turkish actress Ayşegül Siray.

== See also ==
- Kadın (title)
- Valide sultan
- List of consorts of the Ottoman sultans
- List of mothers of the Ottoman sultans
- Ottoman family tree
- Ottoman Imperial Harem

== Sources ==
- Uluçay, M. Çağatay (2011). Padişahların kadınları ve kızları. Ötüken. ISBN 978-9-754-37840-5.
- Açba, Harun (2007). Kadın efendiler: 1839-1924. Profil. ISBN 978-9-759-96109-1.
- Sakaoğlu, Necdet (2008). Bu Mülkün Kadın Sultanları: Vâlide Sultanlar, Hâtunlar, Hasekiler, Kadınefendiler, Sultanefendiler. Oğlak Yayıncılık. ISBN 978-6-051-71079-2.
- Brookes, Douglas Scott (2010). The Concubine, the Princess, and the Teacher: Voices from the Ottoman Harem. University of Texas Press. ISBN 978-0-292-78335-5.
- Paşa, Ahmed Cevdet (1960). Tezâkir. [2]. 13 - 20, Volume 2. Türk Tarih Kurumu Basımevi.

Ottoman royalty
Preceded by Pertevniyal Sultan	Valide Sultan; 30 May 1876 – 31 August 1876	Succeeded by Perestu Kadın
