= Kalfa (harem title) =

Ottoman term for female palace attendants

Kalfa (Turkish for 'apprentice, assistant master') was a general term in the Ottoman Empire for the women attendants and supervisors in service in the imperial palace. Novice girls had to await promotion to the rank of kalfa. It was a rank below that of usta ('master'), the title of the leading administrative/supervisory officers of the harem. The titles usta and kalfa belong to the terminology of Ottoman guild organization and other hierarchically-organized corporate bodies. Legally slave girls, these women—depending on their rank—could wield considerable authority and influence in their duties and were generally treated with much respect by lower-ranking slave attendants in the harem as well as by members of the imperial family.

Among craftsmen, the term had a similar rank: that of a junior master yet to graduate to usta status and open his own shop.

== Imperial kalfas ==
The kalfas in personal service to the monarch were called hünkâr kalfaları (Turkish for 'Imperial Kalfas'). The Hazinedars (Turkish for 'treasurer') were the high-ranking chamberlain kalfas charged with supervisory duties in the harem. Also known as usta, they ranked above ordinary kalfas and included in their number the hünkür kalfaları. Their head, the hazinedar usta or high hazinedar, occupied the second highest position in harem service, immediately below the lady steward.

== Notable kalfas ==
Notable women traditionally addressed as kalfas include Cevri Kalfa, a slave girl who saved Sultan Mahmud II's life and was awarded for her bravery and loyalty and appointed hazinedar usta, the chief treasurer of the Imperial Harem, which was the second-most important position in the hierarchy.

The wives of many sultans were kalfas before their marriages.
