= List of mothers of the Ottoman sultans =

This is a list of the biological mothers of Ottoman sultans. There were thirty-six sultans of the Ottoman Empire in twenty-one generations (during early days the title Bey or Ghazi was used instead of Sultan). Throughout the six-century history, the sultans were the members of the same house, namely the House of Osman (Turkish: Osmanlı Hanedanı).

== Mothers of the Ottoman Sultans ==
This list is distinct from the list of Valide Sultans of the Ottoman Empire. Valide Sultan was the title of the mother of the reigning sultan. The mothers who died before their sons' accession to throne never assumed the title of Valide Sultan, like Hürrem, Muazzez, Mihrişah, and Şermi. On the other hand, stepmothers who were not the biological mothers but raised the princes whose mothers had died assumed the title of Valide Sultan, like Perestu. So there were Valide Sultans who were not the mothers, and there were mothers who were not the Valide Sultans.

=== The detailed list of the mothers ===
Name	Titles	Maiden Name	Origin	Years of life	Son(s)
Halime Hatun (Tradition)	Hatun	Halime	Turkish	died after 1282, Söğüt	Osman I
Malhun Hatun	Hatun	Kameriye Malhun	Turkish	Anatolia — Bursa, after 1326	Orhan I
Nilüfer	Valide Hatun (1362 – 1363)	unknown	Greek	died c. 1363, Bursa, Ottoman Sultanate	Murad I
Gülçiçek	Hatun	unknown	Greek	1335, Bithynia, Ottoman Empire	Bayezid I
Devlet	Valide Hatun (5 July 1413 - 26 May 1421)	unknown	unknown	died c. 1422, Bursa, Ottoman Empire	Mehmed I
Emine	Valide Hatun (1421 – 1449)	Emine	Oghuz Turkic	born in Elbistan, Beylik of Dulkadir —1449, Ottoman Empire	Murad II
Hüma	Valide Hatun (1444 – 1446)	unknown	Greek or Slavic	1446 — September 1449, Bursa, Ottoman Empire	Mehmed II
Emine Gülbahar Mükrime	Valide Hatun (1481 – 1492)	unknown	Pontic Greek from Trabzon, Albanian, Slavic or Turkish	died c. 1492, Constantinople, Ottoman Empire	Bayezid II
Ayşe Gülbahar	Hatun	unknown	Christian slave	c. 1453, unknown, — 1505, Trabzon, Ottoman Empire	Selim I
Ayşe Hafsa	Valide Sultan (1520 – 19 Mar 1534)	unknown	Slave of European or Circassian origin	1478-1479 — 19 March 1534, Constantinople, Ottoman Empire	Suleiman I
Hürrem	Haseki Sultan (May 1534 – 15 April 1558)	Aleksandra or Anastazja Lisowska	Ruthenian	c. 1506/1507, Ruthenia, Kingdom of Poland — 15 April 1558, Topkapı Palace, Constantinople, Ottoman Empire	Selim II
Nurbanu	Haseki Sultan (7 Sep 1566 – 15 Dec 1574); Valide Sultan (15 Dec 1574 – 7 Dec 1583)	Cecilia Venier-Baffo or Rachel Marié Nassi or Kalē Karatanou	Venetian, Jewish or Greek	c. 1525, Paros, Cyclades Islands, or Corfu, Republic of Venice — 7 December 1583, Topkapi Palace, Constantinople, Ottoman Empire	Murad III
Safiye	Haseki Sultan; Valide Sultan (15 Jan 1595 – 22 Dec 1603)	unknown	Albanian	c. 1550, Dukagjin highlands, Albania — January/April 1619, Eski Palace, Constantinople, Ottoman Empire	Mehmed III
Handan	Valide Sultan (22 Dec 1603 – 9 Nov 1605)	unknown	Bosnian or Greek	1570, Ottoman Bosnia or Ottoman Greece — 9 November 1605, Topkapı Palace, Constantinople, Ottoman Empire	Ahmed I
Halime	Valide Sultan (22 Nov 1617 – 26 Feb 1618) and (19 May 1622 – 10 Sep 1623)	unknown	Abkhaz	c. 1570, Abkhazia, Ottoman Empire — after 1623, Eski Palace, Beyazıt Square, Constantinople, Ottoman Empire	Mustafa I
Mahfiruz	Hatun	unknown	unknown	c. 1590 — 1610/1615 Constantinople, Ottoman Empire	Osman II
Kösem	Haseki Sultan (26 Nov 1605 – 22 Nov 1617); Valide Sultan (10 Sep 1623 – 8 Aug 1648); Regent "Naib-i-Sultanat" (10 Sep 1623 – 1632) and (8 Aug 1648 – 3 Sep 1651)	Anastasía	Greek. Born on Tinos, Republic of Venice (?)	c. 1589, Tinos, Republic of Venice or Bosnia — 2 September 1651, Constantinople, Ottoman Empire	Murad IV; Ibrahim I
Turhan	BaşHaseki Sultan (until 8 Aug 1648); Valide Sultan (8 Aug 1648 – 4 Aug 1683); Regent "Naib-i-Sultanat" (3 Sep 1651 – 1656)	unknown	Russian, Circassian or Ukrainian	c. 1627, Russia, Circassia or Ukraine — 4 August 1683, Constantinople, Ottoman Empire	Mehmed IV
Saliha Dilaşub	Haseki Sultan (until 8 Aug 1648); Valide Sultan (8 Nov 1687 – 4 Dec 1689)	unknown	unknown	c. 1627 — 4 December 1689, Edirne Palace, Edirne, Ottoman Empire	Suleiman II
Muazzez	Haseki Sultan (until 8 Aug 1648)	unknown	unknown	1627 — 12 September 1687, Old Palace, Constantinople, Ottoman Empire	Ahmed II
Emetullah Rabia Gülnuş	Haseki Sultan (until 8 Nov 1687); Valide Sultan (6 Feb 1695 - 6 Nov 1715)	Evmania Voria Verzini	From the Greek or Venetian Verzini family from the island of Crete	c. 1642, Rethymno, Republic of Venice — 6 November 1715, Constantinople, Ottoman Empire	Mustafa II; Ahmed III
Saliha	Valide Sultan (20 Sep 1730 – 21 Sep 1739)	unknown	unknown, Serbian or Greek	c. 1680, — 21 September 1739, Tırnakçı Palace, Constantinople, Ottoman Empire	Mahmud I
Şehsuvar	Valide Sultân (13 Dec 1754 – 16 Apr 1756)	unknown	Ukrainian, Russian or Serbian	c. 1682, Tsardom of Russia — 27 April 1756, Topkapı Palace, Constantinople, Ottoman Empire	Osman III
Emine Mihrişah	Kadın	unknown	unknown	unknown — April 1732, Eski Palace, Constantinople, Ottoman Empire	Mustafa III
Rabia Şermi	Kadın	unknown	unknown	unknown — c. 1732, Eski Palace, Constantinople, Ottoman Empire	Abdul Hamid I
Mihrişah	Valide Sultan (7 Apr 1789 – 16 Oct 1805)	unknown	Daughter of Georgian Orthodox priest	c. 1745, Georgia — 16 October 1805, Constantinople, Ottoman Empire	Selim III
Ayşe Sineperver	Valide Sultan (29 May 1807 – 28 July 1808)	unknown	Bulgarian, Circassian or Georgian	c. 1759/1760 — 11 December 1828, Constantinople, Ottoman Empire	Mustafa IV
Nakşidil	Valide Sultan (28 July 1808 – 22 August 1817)	unknown	Georgian	c. 1761 — 22 August 1817, Constantinople, Ottoman Empire	Mahmud II
Bezmiâlem	Valide Sultan (2 Jul 1839 – 2 May 1853)	unknown	Georgian or Circassian	c. 1807, Georgia, Russian Empire — 2 May 1853, Beşiktaş Palace, Constantinople, Ottoman Empire	Abdulmejid I
Pertevniyal	Valide Sultan (25 Jun 1861 – 30 May 1876)	Besime	Kurd, Romanian or Circassian	c. 1812 — 5 February 1883, Ortaköy Palace, Ortaköy, Constantinople, Ottoman Empire	Abdülaziz
Şevkefza	Valide Sultan (30 May 1876 – 31 Aug 1876)		Mingrelian and Circassian	12 December 1820 — 17 September 1889, Çırağan Palace, Ortaköy, Constantinople, Ottoman Empire	Murad V
Tirimüjgan	Kadin	unknown	Circassian	16 August 1819, Circassia — 3 October 1852, Feriye Palace, Constantinople, Ottoman Empire	Abdul Hamid II
Gülcemal	Kadin	unknown	Bosnian	c. 1826, Sarajevo, Bosnia Eyalet, Ottoman Empire — 29 November 1851, Ortaköy Palace, Ortaköy, Constantinople, Ottoman Empire	Mehmed V
Gülistü	Dördüncü Kadın (1860 – May 1861)	Fatma Chachba	Abkhazian	1830, born in Sukhumi, Principality of Abkhazia — 1861, Eyüp Palace, Eyüp, Constantinople, Ottoman Empire	Mehmed VI

== See also ==
- List of Ottoman titles and appellations
- Valide sultan
- Haseki sultan

== Sources ==
- Akyıldız, Ali (2009). "Saliha Sultan" (PDF). Islam Ansiklopedisi. Vol. 36. Istanbul: İslâm Araştırmaları Merkezi. p. 45.
- Alderson, Anthony Dolphin (1956). The Structure of the Ottoman Dynasty. Clarendon Press.
- Babinger, Franz (1992). Mehmed the Conqueror and His Time. Princeton University Press. p. 11. ISBN 978-0-691-01078-6.
- Baer, Marc David (2011). Honored by the Glory of Islam: Conversion and Conquest in Ottoman Europe. Oxford University Press. ISBN 9780199797837.
- Bahadıroğlu, Yavuz (2007). Resimli Osmanlı tarihi. Nesil yayınları. ISBN 978-975-269-299-2.
- Bahadıroğlu, Yavuz (2009). Resimli Osmanlı tarihi (15 ed.). Nesil yayınları.
- Carsten, F. L. (1961). The New Cambridge Modern History. Vol. V. The Ascendancy of France, 1648–88. Cambridge University Press. pp. 505–506. ISBN 9780521045445.
- Cooke, Miriam; Göknar, Erdağ M.; Parker, Grant Richard (2008). Mediterranean passages: readings from Dido to Derrida. University of North Carolina Press. ISBN 9780807831830.
- Davis, Fanny (1970). The Palace of Topkapi in Istanbul. Scribner. OCLC 636864790.
- İpşirli, Mehmet (1996). Gülnûş Emetullah Sultan (PDF). Vol. 14. İstanbul: İslâm Araştırmaları Merkezi. pp. 248–249.
- Karaca, Filiz (2012). "Turhan Sultan". Islam Ansiklopedisi (in Turkish). Vol. 41. İslâm Araştırmaları Merkezi. pp. 423–425.
- Kemal, Meram, Ali (1977). Padişah anaları : resimli, belgesel tarih romanı. Öz Yayınları. OCLC 23697956.
- Peirce, Leslie P. (1993). The Imperial Harem: Women and Sovereignty in the Ottoman Empire. Oxford University Press. ISBN 978-0-19-508677-5.
- Sakaoğlu, Necdet (2015). Bu mülkün kadın sultanları (in Turkish). İstanbul: ALFA Basım Yayım Dağıtım San. ve T ic. Ltd. Şti. pp. 279–291. ISBN 978-605-171-079-2.
- Uluçay, M. Çağatay (2011). Padişahların Kadınları ve Kızları (in Turkish). Is.: Ötüken. pp. 105–107. ISBN 978-9754378405.
