= Meleki Hatun =

Lady-in-waiting to Kösem Sultan and Turhan Hatice Sultan

- Died: 27 February 1656; Istanbul, Ottoman Empire (present day Istanbul, Turkey)
- Spouse: Şaban Halife

Meleki Hatun (Ottoman Turkish: ملکی خاتون; died on 27 February 1656) was a lady-in-waiting to Kösem Sultan, her son Sultan Ibrahim, and later to Hatice Turhan Sultan, Haseki of Ibrahim and mother of Mehmed IV.

== Life ==
Meleki Hatun had originally been a (cariye or odalisque) member of Kösem Sultan's staff. She became a lady-in-waiting (musahibe) to Sultan Ibrahim after he ascended the throne in 1640.

In early 1648, the treasury of Egypt was lavished on Ibrahim’s favourite wives and women, which also included Meleki. In the same year Ibrahim was deposed, and replaced by his six-year-old son, Prince Mehmed as Mehmed IV. Instead of retiring to the Old Palace, Kösem was asked by the leading statesmen of the state to act as Valide Sultan to her grandson, the new Sultan, and Meleki remained with her.

However, Mehmed's mother Turhan Sultan turned out to be ambitious. Kösem planned to replace Mehmed by another grandson, Süleyman, whose mother could easily be controlled. However, her plan was exploited by Meleki Hatun. Kösem was killed in a palace coup in 1651 led by Turhan's chief black eunuch.

Meleki became a favourite retainer of the new Valide Sultan because of her loyalty to her. She married Şaban Halife, a former page in the palace training school. The couple set up a residence in the imperial capital, Istanbul. They were well-suited to act as a channel for information and intercessors on behalf of individuals with petitions for the palace. Meleki received female petitioners, and her husband received male petitioners. Meleki exploited her relationship with Turhan Sultan, while Şaban exploited contacts he had formed while serving at the palace.

Meleki was accused of having a forbidden relationship with Turhan's son, stepsons and with Turhan herself.

== Death ==
The political influence of the couple grew so much that they lost their lives in 1656, when the troops stationed at Istanbul rebelled against alleged abuses in government.

== In popular culture ==
- In the 2010 film Mahpeyker: Kösem Sultan Meleki Hatun is portrayed by a Turkish actress Bulut Köpük.
- In the 2015 TV series Muhteşem Yüzyıl: Kösem, Meleki Hatun is portrayed by three Turkish actresses: Melis Kara in her childhood, Ahsen Eroğlu in her teenage-young, and Şeyma Burcu Gül in her adult.

== Sources ==
- Akalin, Esin (October 11, 2016). Staging the Ottoman Turk: British Drama, 1656Ð1792. Columbia University Press. ISBN 978-3-838-26919-1.
- Boyar, Ebru; Fleet, Kate, eds. (May 9, 2016). Ottoman Women in Public Space. BRIIL. ISBN 978-9-004-31662-1.
- Çelebi, Evliya; Erkılıç, Süleyman Cafer (1954). Turk Klasikleri - Issue 34.
- Helly, Dorothy O.; Reverby, Susan (1992). Gendered Domains: Rethinking Public and Private in Women's History : Essays from the Seventh Berkshire Conference on the History of Women. Cornell University Press. ISBN 978-0-801-49702-5.
- Hunt, Margaret (June 11, 2014). Women in Eighteenth Century Europe. Routledge. ISBN 978-1-317-88388-3.
- Peirce, Leslie P. (1993). The Imperial Harem: Women and Sovereignty in the Ottoman Empire. Oxford University Press. ISBN 978-0-195-08677-5.
- Thys-Şenocak, Lucienne (2006). Ottoman Women Builders: The Architectural Patronage of Hadice Turhan Sultan. Ashgate. ISBN 978-0-754-63310-5.
- Walthall, Anne (June 10, 2008). Servants of the Dynasty: Palace Women in World History. University of California Press. ISBN 978-0-520-25443-5.
