= Hümaşah Sultan (wife of Ibrahim) =

Eighth Haseki Sultan and wife of Ottoman Sultan Ibrahim

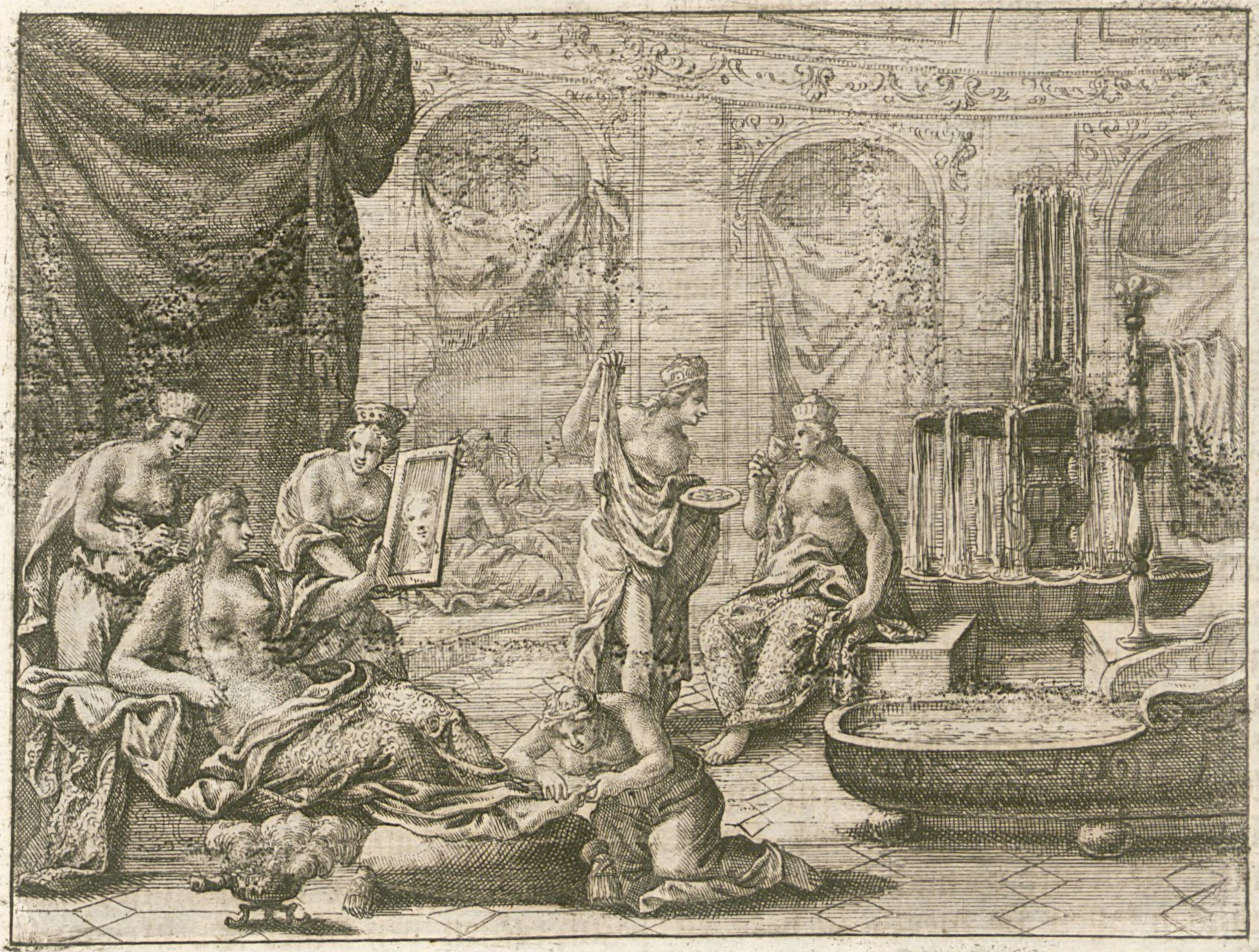
- Hümaşah being served by Imperial princesses, 1694 by Paul Rycaut.

Haseki Sultan of the Ottoman Empire (Imperial Consort)
- Tenure: 1647 – 8 August 1648
- Predecessor: Ayşe Sultan; Unnamed Second Haseki
- Successor: Emetullah Rabia Gülnuş Sultan
- Born: c. 1630; Georgia or Circassia
- Died: after 1678; Constantinople, Ottoman Empire (present day Istanbul, Turkey)
- Spouse: Ibrahim I (m. 1647; died 1648) Kaimacan Ibrahim Pasha (m. 1672)
- Issue: First marriage Şehzade Orhan
Names
- Turkish: Hümaşah Sultan; Ottoman Turkish: ھما شاہ سلطان
- House: Ottoman (by marriage)
- Religion: Sunni Islam, previously Georgian Orthodoxy

Hümaşah Zeynep Sultan (Ottoman Turkish: ھما شاہ سلطان; "Şah's phoenix"; c.1630 – after 1678) was the Eighth Haseki and the only legal wife of Sultan Ibrahim of the Ottoman Empire.

== Marriage ==
Hümaşah married Ibrahim in 1647, and was given the title of "Eighth Haseki". After her marriage she became known as "Telli Haseki" because of the silver and gold threads (tels) that are traditionally used to adorn a bride's hair. Her marriage was described by the historian Mustafa Naima:

In accordance with imperial command, the viziers of the imperial council each gave the gift of moon faced slave girl bedecked with jewels. Then they escorted (the bride) in a well ordered procession from the gardens of Davud pasha to the imperial palace. The ceremony was performed by the chief black eunuch acting as proxy for the bride and the grand vizier for the sultan. Robes of honour were bestowed on the viziers and the ulema and others received honours according to custom.

After marrying her, Ibrahim gave her the treasury of Egypt as dowry and ordered the palace of Ibrahim Pasha to be carpeted in sable furs and given to her.

Ibrahim subjected his sisters, Kösem's daughters Ayşe, Fatma and Hanzade, and his niece Kaya to the indignity of subordination of his concubines. He took away their lands and jewels, and made them serve Hümaşah, by standing at attention like servants while she ate and by fetching and holding the soap, basin and the pitcher of water with which she washed her hands. The Sultan then banished them to Edirne Palace over what he considered their failure to serve her properly.

She was described as intelligent and smart, but also sweet and caring.

Hümaşah while pregnant, settled in the Old Palace, after Ibrahim's deposition and death in August 1648. Two months later, in October 1648, she gave birth to a son named Şehzade Orhan, who died at the age of one in January 1650.

== Death ==
The records of the Old Palace document the presence of Hümaşah for the last time in 1672.

It was initially believed that she died in that year, but the discovery of the report, dated 1676, by the Venetian ambassador Giacomo Querini, proves instead that Hümaşah, contrary to the normal harem protocol for the consort of deceased sultans, especially if they were mothers of children, she had remarried, with the Kaymakam (vice governor) of Constantinople, Ibrahim Paşah. 1672 was therefore probably the year when she remarried and left the Palace.

"... Ibrahim Pasha, Caimacan [governor] of Constantinople for the fifth time, a man of considerable presence, of sweet genius and placid costume. He holds in marriage the Telì Sultana, the King’s stepmother...", Giacomo Querini, Venetian ambassador, 1676

It is therefore not known when she died or where she was buried.

== Issue ==
By Ibrahim, Hümaşah had a son:

Şehzade Orhan (October 1648, Constantinople – January 1650, Constantinople).

== In popular culture ==
In the Turkish series, Muhteşem Yüzyıl: Kösem, Hümaşah is portrayed by actress Müge Boz.

== See also ==
- Ottoman Empire
- Ottoman family tree
- Ottoman dynasty
- Ottoman Emperors family tree (simplified)
- List of consorts of the Ottoman Sultans

== Sources ==
- Kaya, Nevzat (1990). Kara Çelebi-zade Abdülaziz Efendi'nin Zeyl-i Ravzatü'l-Ebrar'ı : tahlil ve metin.
- Peirce, Leslie Penn (1993). The Imperial Harem: Women and Sovereignty in the Ottoman Empire. Studies in Middle Eastern History. New York: Oxford University Press. ISBN 978-0-19-507673-8.
- Sakaoğlu, Necdet (2008). Bu Mülkün Kadın Sultanları: Vâlide Sultanlar, Hâtunlar, Hasekiler, Kandınefendiler, Sultanefendiler. Oğlak Yayıncılık. ISBN 978-6-051-71079-2.
- Uluçay, M. Çağatay (2011). Padişahların kadınları ve kızları. Ötüken. ISBN 978-9-754-37840-5.

Ottoman royalty
Preceded by Ayşe Sultan	Haseki Sultan until 12 August 1648 concurrently with Turhan, Dilaşub, Muazzez, Ayşe, Mahienver, Saçbağlı and Șivekar	Succeeded by Gülnuş Sultan
