= Şivekar Sultan =

Seventh Haseki Sultan of Ottoman Sultan Ibrahim

Haseki Sultan of the Ottoman Empire (Imperial Consort)
- Tenure: 1646 – 8 August 1648
- Predecessor: Ayşe Sultan; Unnamed Second Haseki
- Successor: Emetullah Rabia Gülnuş Sultan
- Born: Maria (?); Constantinople, Ottoman Empire (?)
- Died: 1693; Constantinople, Ottoman Empire (present day Istanbul, Turkey)
- Burial: Ibrahim I Mausoleum, Hagia Sophia, Istanbul
- Spouse: Ibrahim Ahmed Pasha (m. 1649; died 1651) Silahdar Mehmed Pasha (after 1651)
- Issue: With Ibrahim; Şehzade Cihangir
Names
- Turkish: Şivekar Sultan; Ottoman Turkish: شوکار سلطان
- House: Ottoman
- Religion: Sunni Islam, previously Orthodox Christian

Şivekar Sultan (Ottoman Turkish: شیوه کار سلطان, romanized: 4; died 1693) was the seventh Haseki sultan of Sultan Ibrahim (reign 1640 – 1648) of the Ottoman Empire.

== Life ==
She was of Armenian descent. Her real name was Maria, and she was the daughter of a wealthy Armenian merchant.

Şivekar Sultan was morbidly obese. In 1646, Ibrahim appointed his servants to look for the "fattest woman" in Constantinople. Upon this order, they started to search for palace officials and eventually found an Armenian woman in Üsküdar. Maria became his consort and he gave her the name Şivekar, meaning "flirty". She was then given the title of Seventh Haseki. She had a good relation with Cinci Hoca Pasha and later with the Eighth Haseki Hümaşah Sultan.

She was politically active during Ibrahim's last years. Ibrahim soon became mentally ill, and Şivekar helped sooth his tensions. She was among the strongest consorts of Ibrahim in the Ottoman Harem's politics. In addition, all Damascus revenues were donated to Şivekar Sultan. She gave birth to a son, named Şehzade Cihangir, in 1646, who died in infancy.

After Ibrahim's deposition in 1648 she moved to the old palace along with other consorts of Ibrahim. Şivekar remarried in 1649 to Ahmed Pasha and left the Old Palace. Shortly after the marriage Ahmed died and she later married Silahdar Mehmed Pasha, Şivekar died in 1693.

Şivekar Sultan founded some foundations and vakfs in her lifetime.

She is buried inside the Ibrahim I Mausoleum at Hagia Sophia in Istanbul.

== Issue ==
By Ibrahim, Şivekar Sultan had a son:

- Şehzade Cihangir (14 December 1646 – 1 December 1648). Born and died in Topkapi Palace, Constantinople.

== In popular culture ==
- In the 2015 Turkish historical fiction TV series Muhteşem Yüzyıl: Kösem, Şivekar Sultan is portrayed by Turkish actress Gümeç Alpay Aslan.
- In the 2022 romantic fantasy drama film Three Thousand Years of Longing starring Tilda Swinton, Şivekar Sultan is portrayed by Anna Adams.

== Sources ==
- Uluçay, M. Çağatay (1992). Padişahların kadınları ve kızları. Ötüken.
- Sakaoğlu, Necdet (2008). Bu Mülkün Kadın Sultanları: Vâlide Sultanlar, Hâtunlar, Hasekiler, Kandınefendiler, Sultanefendiler. Oğlak Yayıncılık. ISBN 978-6-051-71079-2.
- Uluçay, M. Çağatay (2007). Padişahların kadınları ve kızları. Ötüken.
- Bardakçı, Murat (1992). Sex in Ottomans.

Ottoman royalty
Preceded by Ayşe Sultan	Haseki Sultan until 12 August 1648 concurrently with Turhan, Dilaşub, Muazzez, Ayşe, Mahienver, Saçbağlı and Hümaşah	Succeeded by Gülnuş Sultan
