= Muazzez Sultan =

Haseki Sultan of the Ottoman Empire (Imperial Consort)
- Tenure: 1643 – 8 August 1648
- Predecessor: Ayşe Sultan; Unnamed Second Haseki
- Successor: Emetullah Rabia Gülnuş Sultan
- Died: 12 September 1687; Old Palace, Constantinople, Ottoman Empire
- Burial: Üsküdar, Istanbul
- Consort of: Ibrahim
- Issue: Ahmed II; Gevherhan Sultan; Fatma Sultan (?)
Names
- Turkish: Hatice Muazzez Sultan; Ottoman Turkish: خدیجہ معزز سلطان
- House: Ottoman
- Religion: Sunni Islam (conversion)

Hatice Muazzez Sultan (Ottoman Turkish: خدیجہ معزز سلطان, "respectful lady" and "precious"; died 12 September 1687) was the second Haseki Sultan of Sultan Ibrahim and the mother of Sultan Ahmed II.

== Life ==
Muazzez entered in Ibrahim's harem around 1640, became his concubine, and between 2 January and 15 April 1542 she was entitled second Haseki Sultan, and gave birth to her only certain son, Şehzade Ahmed (future Ahmed II) on 25 February 1643. During Ibrahim's reign, she received a stipend of 1,000 aspers a day. She was the most beautiful of all of Ibrahim's concubine and was known for her mild character and good manners in the palace.

After the deposition and death of Sultan Ibrahim in 1648, his eldest son, Sultan Mehmed IV, son of Turhan Sultan, ascended the throne, after which Muazzez settled in the Old Palace. This brought her thirty eight years of imprisonment in the Old Palace and separation from her son, who was closed in the Kafes.

== Death and aftermath ==
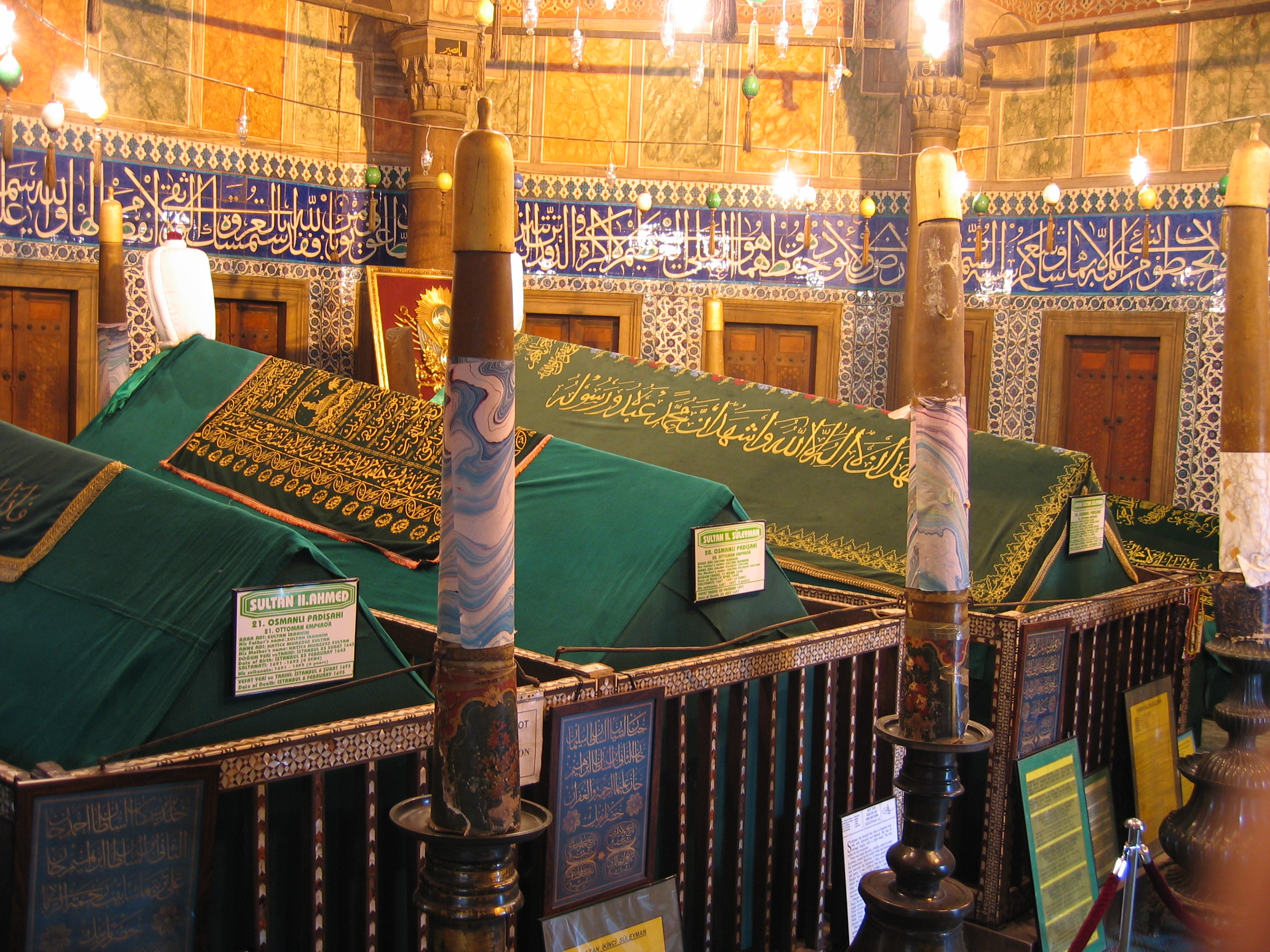
The grave of Hatice Muazzez is located next to her son Ahmed II inside the mausoleum of Suleiman the Magnificent at the Süleymaniye Mosque.

In 1687, a large fire broke out near the Old Palace. By the next evening the fire had engulfed the Old Palace. The fire burned for five hours and the palace burned down in many places. Most of lives of people in the Old Palace were saved by the servants in the palace. Muazzez was so severely burned in the fire that she died the next day. Her body was taken to Üsküdar, and buried near a palace around there. Thus, she was not Valide sultan to her son because she died four years before Ahmed II's accession to the throne.

Wares belonging to Muazzez, were immediately placed in the imperial treasury. Her jewelry was given to Behzad Kadın, Süğlün Kadın, and Șehsuvar Kadın, consorts of the new Sultan Suleiman II. But when her son ascended the throne in 1691, he took away the jewelry from the consorts of the recently deceased Sultan and placed the jewelry in the imperial treasury.

== Issue ==
Together with Ibrahim, Muazzez had a son and a daughter:

- Ahmed II (Topkapı Palace, 25 February 1643 – Edirne, Turkey, 6 February 1695, buried in Süleymaniye Mosque). Sultan of the Ottoman Empire.
- Gevherhan Sultan (Constantinople, 1642 – October 27, 1694). She was close to Rabia Sultan, Haseki of Ahmed II, and donated some of her properties and income to their newborn daughter, Asiye Sultan.

It is not known for sure if she had other children, but according to some she was also the mother of:

- Fatma Sultan (Constantinople, 1642 – 1657) In 1645 she married Musahip Silahdar Yusuf Paşah, who was executed on January 22, 1646. A month later, her father married her to Musahib Fazlı Paşa, who Ibrahim exiled a couple of months after while causing to divorce them. She was buried in the Yeni Valide mosque

== In popular culture ==
- In the 2015 Turkish historical non-fiction TV series Muhteşem Yüzyıl: Kösem, Muazzez Sultan is portrayed by Turkish actress Firuze Gamze Aksu.

== See also ==
- Ottoman family tree
- Ottoman dynasty
- List of consorts of the Ottoman sultans
- List of mothers of the Ottoman sultans

== Notes ==
1. She is either called Hatice Muazzez Sultan, Hatice Sultan, or Muazzez Hanım.

== Sources ==
- Uluçay, M. Çağatay (2011). Padişahların kadınları ve kızları. Ötüken. ISBN 978-9-754-37840-5.
- Sakaoğlu, Necdet (2008). Bu Mülkün Kadın Sultanları: Vâlide Sultanlar, Hâtunlar, Hasekiler, Kandınefendiler, Sultanefendiler. Oğlak Yayıncılık. ISBN 978-6-051-71079-2.

Ottoman royalty
Preceded by Ayşe Sultan	Haseki Sultan until 12 August 1648 concurrently with Turhan, Dilaşub, Ayşe, Mahienver, Saçbağlı, Şivekar and Hümaşah	Succeeded by Gülnuş Sultan
