= Saliha Dilaşub Sultan =

Valide Sultan of the Ottoman Empire

- Valide sultan
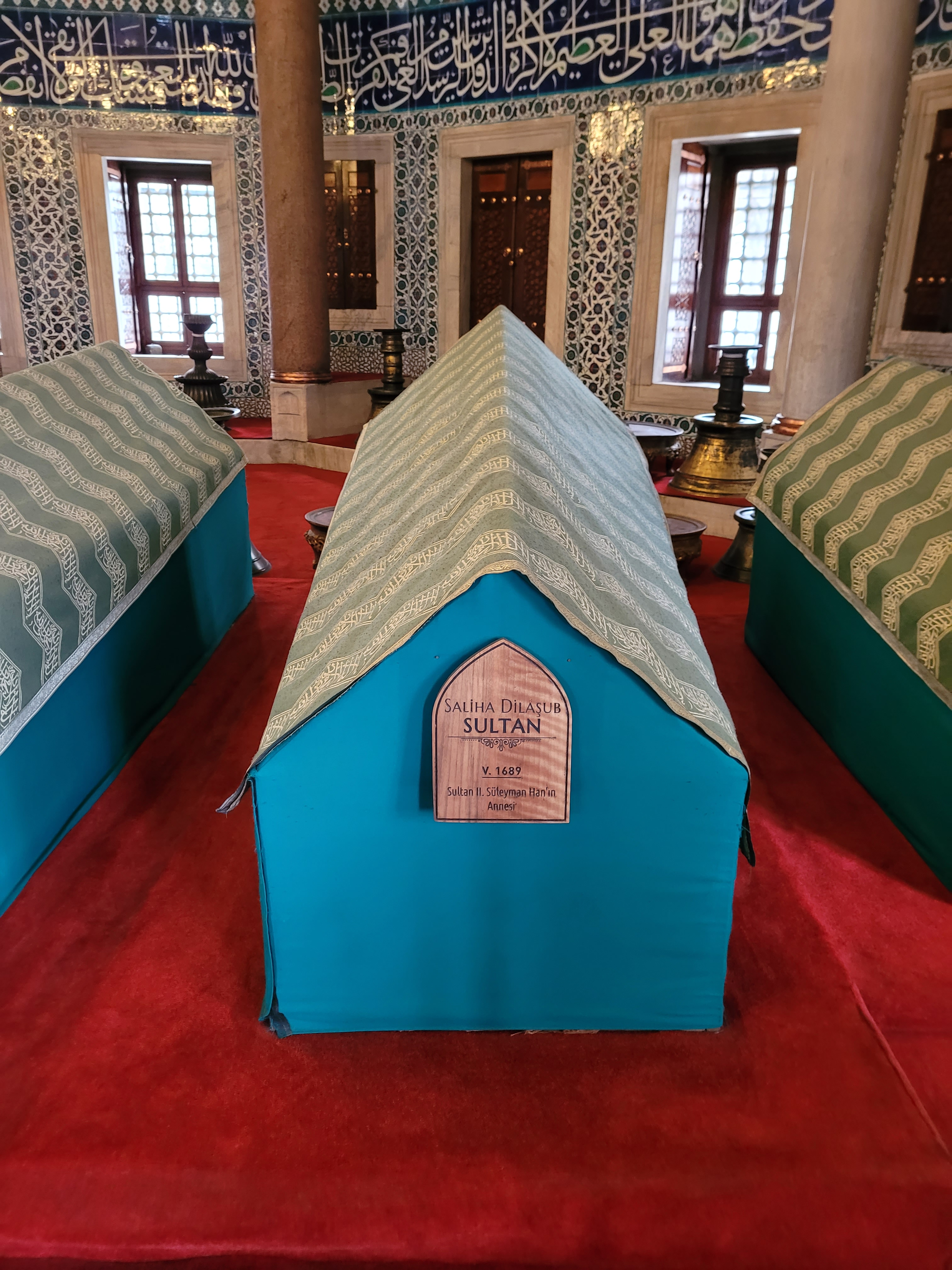
- Sarcophagus of Saliha Dilaşub Sultan inside the Süleymaniye Mosque

Valide Sultan of the Ottoman Empire
- Tenure: 8 November 1687 – 4 December 1689
- Predecessor: Turhan Sultan
- Successor: Emetullah Rabia Gülnuş Sultan

Haseki Sultan of the Ottoman Empire (Imperial Consort)
- Tenure: 1642 – 8 August 1648
- Predecessor: Ayşe Sultan; Unnamed Second Haseki
- Successor: Gülnuş Sultan
- Died: 4 December 1689; Edirne Palace, Edirne, Ottoman Empire
- Burial: Süleymaniye Mosque, Constantinople
- Consort of: Ibrahim
- Issue: Suleiman II
Names
- Turkish: Saliha Dilaşub Sultan; Ottoman Turkish: آشوب سلطان
- House: Ottoman
- Religion: Sunni Islam (converted)

Saliha Dilaşub Sultan (Ottoman Turkish: سلطان آشوب; died 4 December 1689), also known as Aşub Sultan or Aşube Sultan, was a consort of Ottoman Sultan Ibrahim and the mother of Suleiman II.

== Early life ==
Saliha Dilaşub Sultan's birthplace, origins, and the year she entered the palace are unknown. She is sometimes claimed to have been of Serbian origin. She came to the Ottoman imperial harem via the Ottoman slave trade.

== Consort ==
She became the first concubine of Ibrahim after his rise at the throne. On 15 April 1642, she gave birth to her only son, Şehzade Suleiman (the future Suleiman II).

During Ibrahim's reign her stipend consisted of 1,300 aspers a day. He also gifted the incomes of Bolu Sanjak to her. She was described as a simple-hearted woman of lively and cheerful character.

== After the death of Ibrahim ==
After the deposition and death of Sultan Ibrahim in 1648, his eldest son, Mehmed IV, born by Turhan Sultan and only three months older than Suleiman, ascended the throne, after which Saliha Dilaşub settled in the Old Palace. This brought her thirty-nine years of imprisonment in the Old Palace.

In 1651, the conflict between Turhan Sultan and Kösem Sultan, mother of Ibrahim, could have changed her fortune in that she could become the Valide Sultan herself. Kösem was planning to kill her daughter-in-law and dethrone Mehmed with the help of some high officers in the yeniçeri corps, and to place Şehzade Suleiman on the throne, because Kösem thought that he and his mother were more controllable. However, Meleki Hatun warned Turhan, who managed to strangle her mother-in-law with the help of the eunuchs in the Harem in 1651. Saliha Dilaşub herself was spared from execution since she was not suspected in plotting against Turhan and Mehmed.

In 1672–1673, she created an endowment at Istanbul.

In 1687, Mehmed was deposed and the throne was overtaken by Suleiman, and Dilaşub became the next valide sultan.

In July 1688, she followed her son to Edirne, reuniting with him after 39 years of separation, in which she was only allowed to see him twice a year on the occasion of festive celebrations. Her son honored her with a splendid settlement procession and the awarding of a large number of precious jewels, including a pair of pearl and diamond earrings.

== Death ==
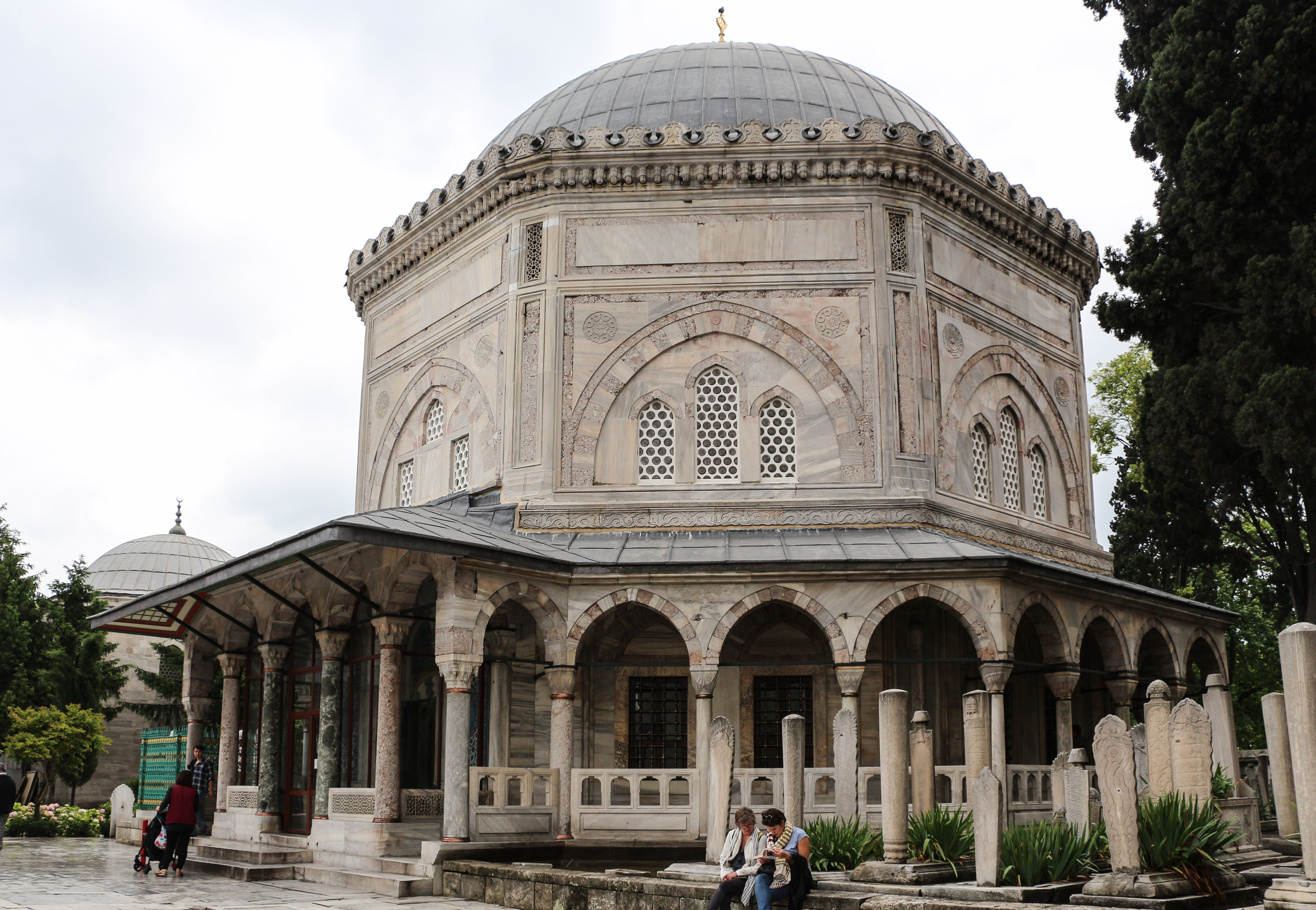
Mausoleum of Suleiman the Magnificent

She died in the Edirne Palace on 4 December 1689, having been bedridden. She was buried in the mausoleum of Suleiman the Magnificent in the Süleymaniye Mosque.

== Issue ==
Together with Ibrahim, Saliha Dilaşub had a son:

- Suleiman II (Topkapı Palace, Istanbul, 15 April 1642 – Edirne Palace, Edirne, 22 June 1691, buried in Süleymaniye Mosque, Istanbul). Sultan of the Ottoman Empire.

== In popular culture ==
- Portrayed by Gökcan Gökmen in the 2010 Turkish film Mahpeyker: Kösem Sultan.
- Portrayed by Ece Güzel in the 2015 Turkish TV series Muhteşem Yüzyıl: Kösem.

== See also ==
- Ottoman family tree
- Women in the Ottoman Empire
- List of the mothers of the Ottoman sultans
- List of Ottoman imperial consorts

== Sources ==
- Uluçay, M. Çağatay (2011). Padişahların kadınları ve kızları. Ötüken. ISBN 978-9-754-37840-5.
- Sakaoğlu, Necdet (2008). Bu Mülkün Kadın Sultanları: Vâlide Sultanlar, Hâtunlar, Hasekiler, Kandınefendiler, Sultanefendiler. Oğlak Yayıncılık. ISBN 978-6-051-71079-2.

Ottoman royalty
| Preceded by Ayşe Sultan | Haseki Sultan until 12 August 1648 concurrently with Turhan, Muazzez, Ayşe, Mahienver, Saçbağlı, Șivekar, and Hümaşah | Succeeded by Gülnuş Sultan |
| Preceded by Turhan Sultan | Valide Sultan; 8 November 1687 – 3 January 1690 | Succeeded by Gülnuş Sultan |
