= Ayşe Sultan (Haseki of Murad IV) =

Haseki Sultan of the Ottoman Empire (Chief Consort)
- Tenure: c. 1628 – 8 February 1640
- Predecessor: Ayşe Sultan
- Successor: Turhan Sultan; Saliha Dilaşub Sultan; Muazzez Sultan; Ayşe Sultan; Mahienver Sultan; Saçbağlı Sultan; Şivekar Sultan; Hümaşah Sultan
- Died: 1680; Old Palace, Istanbul, Ottoman Empire
- Consort of: Murad IV
Names
- Turkish: Ayşe Sultan; Ottoman Turkish: عایشه سلطان
- Religion: Sunni Islam (converted)

Ayşe Sultan (Ottoman Turkish: عایشه سلطان, romanized: 4; died c. 1680) was the Consort of Ottoman Sultan Murad IV and a Haseki Sultan of the Ottoman Empire from 1628 until the death of Murad IV in 1640.

== Life ==
=== Early life ===
She is the only known haseki of Sultan Murad IV. Her family background, ethnicity, birth and death dates, and children are unknown.

=== At the Ottoman Imperial Court ===
As per custom, she was brought to the harem via the Ottoman slave trade. She most likely appeared in the Ottoman harem at around 1627 and soon became Sultan Murad IV's favorite concubine. Later on, she became his Haseki Sultan. She certainly bore him children, but it is not known how many and which of Murad IV's children were born by her, although, as reported by a European ambassador, Murad IV had twelve children by his favorite consort (and that may refer to her, but the veracity of this information is not verified).

The Privy Purse registers the presence of Ayşe as Murad's only Haseki until the very end of Murad's seventeen-year reign, when a second concubine, with the very high salary of 2,751 coin a day (but reduced to 2,000 after seven months), appeared. According to historian Leslie Peirce, this woman was named as Murad's second Haseki, but however, other historians are not certain in giving her such a title.

In 1633 Murad raised Ayşe's stipend to 2,000 aspers a day, where it remained throughout his reign. The increase was most likely linked to a general increase in stipends throughout the palace during Murad's reign, described by Koçi Bey, and was accompanied by a marked growth in the size of the harem. These changes were probably an aspect of Murad's dramatic assertion of personal control of government after nine years of his mother's regency.

=== Last years and death ===
After Murad IV’s death in February 1640, Ayşe, like his other concubines, was sent out of Topkapı Palace. The last mention of her receiving the stipend was in 1679/1680, and it is very probable that she died around that time.

== In popular culture ==
In the TV series Muhteşem Yüzyıl: Kösem, Ayşe is portrayed by Turkish actress Leyla Feray. In the series, she is the mother of Şehzade Ahmed, Hanzade Sultan and Kaya Sultan. Her death is different from reality: she commits suicide with her children except Kaya years before Murad's death.

Ottoman royalty
Preceded by Ayşe Sultan	Haseki Sultan; May 1630 – 8 February 1640	Succeeded by Turhan Sultan (among others)
