= Şekerpare Hatun =

Lady-in-waiting to Sultan Ibrahim

- Died: 1649; Chios or Egypt, Ottoman Empire
- Spouse: Kara Musa Pasha

Şehsuvar Şekerpare Hatun (Ottoman Turkish: شکر پارہ خاتون, "intrepid heroine" and "sugar lump", died in 1649), previously known as Şehsuvar Usta, was a lady-in-waiting to Sultan Ibrahim of the Ottoman Empire.

== Career ==
As customary for the Ottoman female courtiers in this time period, she entered the Imperial Ottoman Harem as a slave and began her career in Sultan Ibrahim's harem as the Hazinedar Usta (treasurer) of the imperial harem. She was later appointed Kethüde Hatun (mistress housekeeper). At the start, she was a high-ranked lady-in-waiting of Kösem Sultan, the mother of Ibrahim.

In 1644 the grand vizier Kemankeş Mustafa Pasha's standing was threatened by a powerful faction which was controlling the appointment and dismissal of certain individuals, even enriching its members in the process. This party included Şekerpare as well as Ibrahim's other male favourites. Mustafa Pasha was executed, and Ibrahim appointed his favourite Sultanzade Mehmed Pasha as the new grand vizier.

Şekerpare had great influence in the harem and attained wealth, apparently through bribery. A dispute arose between her and Kösem Sultan due to this bribery, and finally Şekerpare was exiled to the island of Chios or to Egypt in May 1648; she died in 1649.

== Personal life ==
In 1647, Şekerpare married grand vizier Kara Musa Pasha. She played an important role in his career. He advanced in his career through his connection to Şekerpare; he first became agha of janissaries with the vizierate, and then held the post of intendant of finances.

The treasure of Egypt was lavished on Ibrahim's favourite wives and women, which included Şekerpare. A house was also bought for her. She also owned sixteen chests of jewelry.

It was known that Ebezade Hamide Hatun, wife of Hasan Pasha, the governor of Aleppo, was a friend of Şekerpare Hatun.

== Sponsorings ==
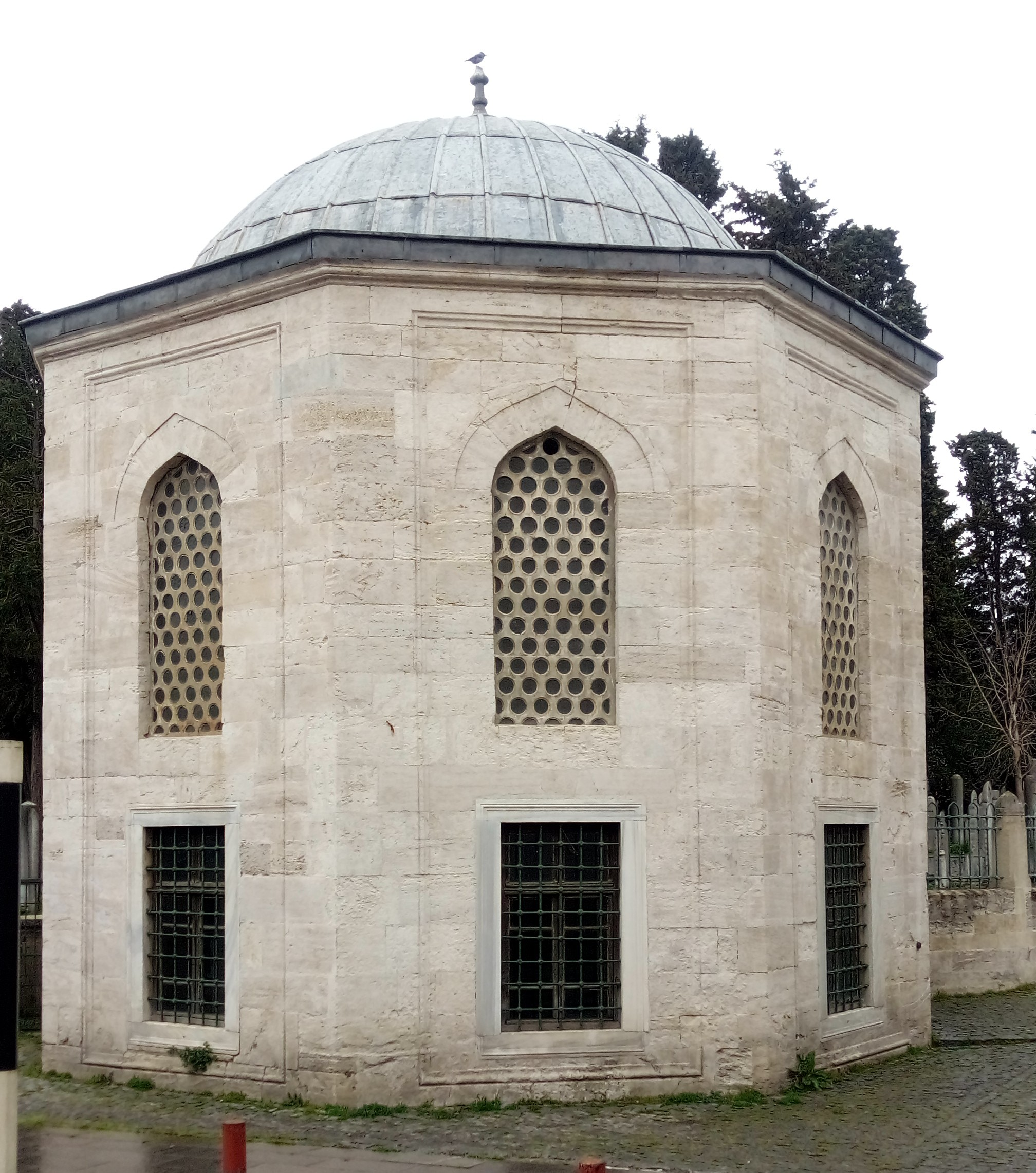
The tomb built by Şekerpare Hatun.

In early 1648 she endowed a fountain in Istanbul and commissioned the building of her own mausoleum at Eyüp, which, however, remained empty.

== Sources ==
- Ágoston, Gábor; Masters, Bruce Alan (May 21, 2010). Encyclopedia of the Ottoman Empire. Infobase Publishing. ISBN 978-1-438-11025-7.
- Argit, Betül Ipsirli (October 29, 2020). Life after the Harem: Female Palace Slaves, Patronage and the Imperial Ottoman Court. Cambridge University Press. ISBN 978-1-108-48836-5.
- Çelebi, Evliya; Erkılıç, Süleyman Cafer (1954). Turk Klasikleri - Issue 34.
- Haskan, Mehmet Nermi (2008). Eyüp Sultan tarihi - Volume 2. Eyüp Belediyesi Kültür Yayınları. ISBN 978-9-756-08704-6.
- Peirce, Leslie P. (1993). The Imperial Harem: Women and Sovereignty in the Ottoman Empire. Oxford University Press. ISBN 978-0-195-08677-5.
- Sakaoğlu, Necdet (2008). Bu mülkün kadın sultanları: Vâlide sultanlar, hâtunlar, hasekiler, kadınefendiler, sultanefendiler. Oğlak Yayıncılık. ISBN 978-9-753-29623-6.
- Tanışık, İbrahim Hilmi (1945). İstanbul çeşmeleri: Beyoğlu ve Üsküdar cihetleri. Maarif Matbaası.
