= Eski Saray =

Coordinates: 41°0′40.37″N 28°57′50.84″E

Eski Saray "Old Palace"
- Alternative names: Sarây-ı Atîk-i Âmire

General information
- Location: Ottoman Empire, Istanbul (Turkey)
- Construction started: 1453
- Construction stopped: 1455–1458
- Client: Mehmed II

Eski Saray (Turkish for "Old Palace"), also known as Sarây-ı Atîk-i Âmire, was a palatial building in Constantinople under the Ottoman Empire in the Beyazıt neighborhood of the Fatih district, between the Süleymaniye Mosque and the Bayezid II Mosque.

Construction of the palace began shortly after the 1453 conquest and was completed in 1458. Historians of the period including Doukas and Michael Critobulus stated that it was completed in 1455.

Evliya Çelebi stated in his Seyahatnâme that the construction of the palace began in 1454 on the site of an old church and that the palace was surrounded by a solid rectangular wall covered with a blue lead that had a perimeter of 12,000 arşın, approximately equivalent to 9 kilometres (5.6 mi).

Historian Tursun Beg, a contemporary of Mehmed II, mentioned that the palace housed mansions, a harem, the Imperial Council, the throne room where the Sultan carried out state affairs, and its grounds included an area for hunting.

When the construction of Topkapi Palace was completed in 1481, the Imperial Council and the administration was shifted to the Topkapi, while the Old Palace housed the Imperial Harem of the Empire. Until the reign of Suleiman, Ottoman concubines including the Mother, sisters, consorts and daughters of the Sultans were not allowed to stay in the Topkapi palace and mostly stayed in the Old Palace. Mehmed the Conqueror had specifically issued a decree to the effect that no women would be allowed to reside in the same building where government affairs were conducted.

In 1541, Hurrem Sultan, wife of Suleiman the Magnificent and the Haseki sultan of the Ottoman Empire at that time, ordered to permanently shift the entire Ottoman Imperial Harem and the Residence of all the Ottoman Royal family members to the Topkapi Palace after a fire broke out in the Old Palace in the same year. It is also assumed that she took this decision because she wanted to increase her influence and authority over the Ottoman Empire's State and Foreign affairs as it was difficult for her to take part in the administration and decision making while staying in a different Palace. This decision reduced the importance of the Old Palace and the Palace became almost uninhabited and irrelevant as nearly all members and the entire luxury was shifted to the new palace. From then on, Topkapı Palace became the official Imperial residence of the entire Ottoman Dynasty, center of administration of the Empire and the head of imperial Harem. After Hurrem settled in Topkapi, it was known as "New Palace".

Although the Old Palace lost its importance, it was still actively used and acted as a retirement home for the former wives, mothers, sisters and the daughters of the former sultans and also housed the servants and assistants of those female royal members. Prominent figures like Safiye Sultan, Ayşe Sultan (wife of Murad IV), Halime Sultan, Muazzez Sultan spent their retirement life and finally died in the Old Palace. In 1625–1632 under Murad IV the palace was restored.

In 1687, a huge fire broke out in the Old Palace, and the Palace was completely burned to the ground with no remains. Muazzez Sultan, mother of Ahmed II, was living her retirement life in the Palace and died in the fire, although other royal members and servants were saved. The palace was never reconstructed.
