= Haseki sultan =

Title used for the chief consort of an Ottoman sultan

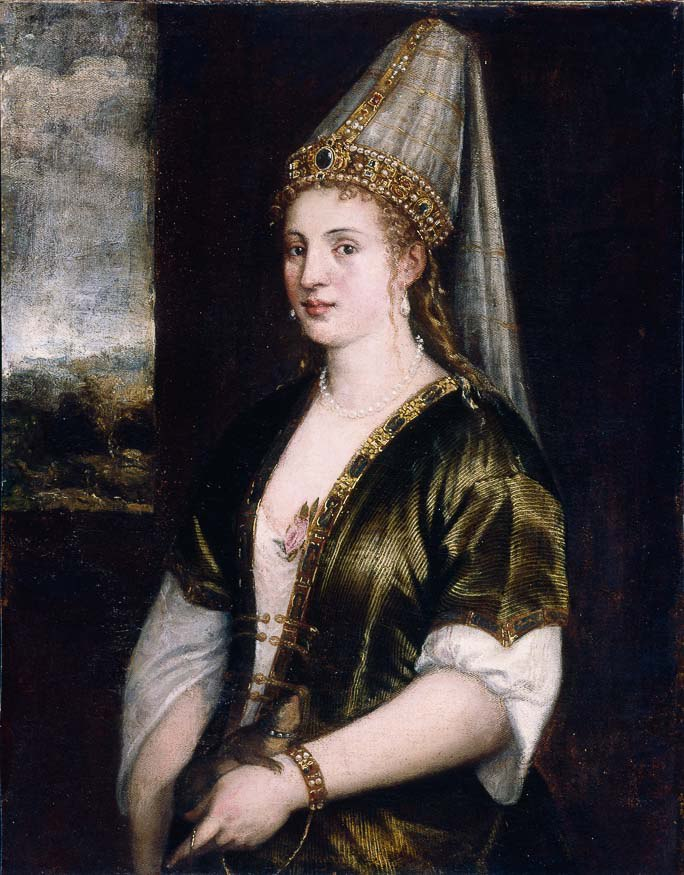
Hürrem Sultan, the first (and likely the most famous) haseki of the Ottoman Empire

Haseki sultan (Ottoman Turkish: خاصکى سلطان, romanized: Hāṣekī Sulṭān, Turkish pronunciation: [haseˈci suɫˈtaːn]) was a title used for the chief consort of an Ottoman sultan. It was created for Hürrem Sultan, the legal wife of Suleiman the Magnificent. The title completely lost its exclusivity under Ibrahim, who bestowed it upon eight women simultaneously, but continued to be used until the 17th century, when kadın became the highest-ranking title for imperial consorts.

== Term ==
The word haseki (خاصکي-خاصگی) comes from the Arabic word khassa (خاصه), which is suffixed with the Persian gi (گی) and means "to attribute something exclusively to". A haseki is, therefore, one who belongs exclusively to the ruler.

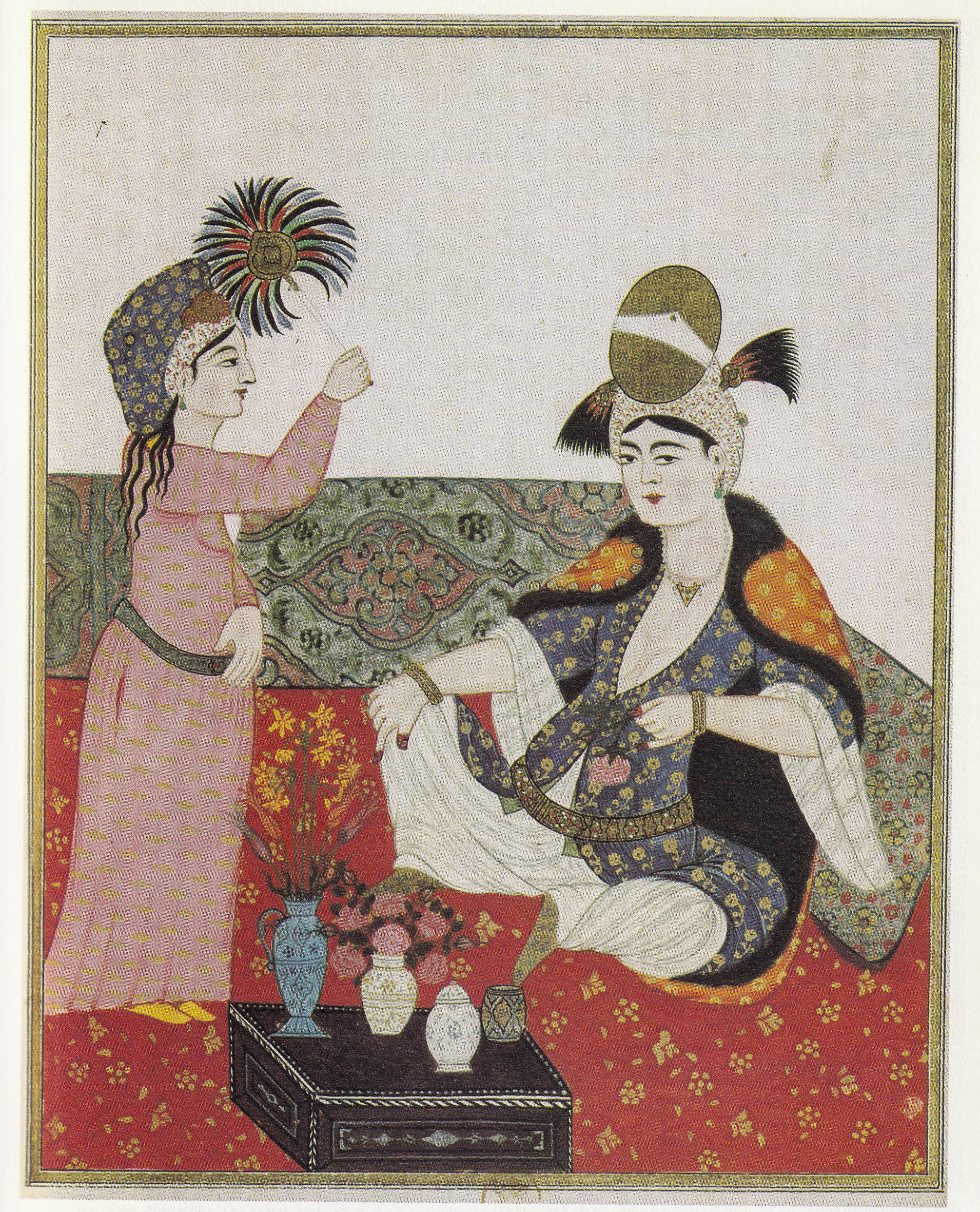
An unidentified haseki with a servant, 1688

Sultan (سلطان) is an Arabic word that indicates "authority" or "dominion". Starting from the 16th century, this title was carried by both men and women, thus replacing other titles by which prominent members of the imperial family had been known (notably hatun for women and bey for men). The Ottoman ruler's formal title consisted of sultan together with han (e.g. Sultan Suleiman Han). In formal address, the sultan's children were also entitled to the sultan title, with imperial princes (şehzade) carrying the title before their given name (e.g. Şehzade Sultan Mehmed), and imperial princesses carrying it after (e.g. Mihrimah Sultan). Like imperial princesses, the mothers and chief consorts of the ruling sultan carried the title after their given names (e.g. Hafsa Sultan and Hürrem Sultan). The evolving usage of the sultan title reflects power shifts among imperial women, especially during the Sultanate of Women.

While the Ottoman Empire never had an official empress consort, when Suleiman broke tradition by freeing Hürrem, his favorite concubine, from slavery and legally marrying her, she was elevated to an extraordinary position; thus, the haseki sultan title that had been created for her can be seen as equivalent to the title of empress consort.

Although a handful of other women held the title after Hürrem, this didn't necessarily result from legal marriages, and none enjoyed the same esteem or authority during their tenures.

Nevertheless, the haseki sultan title, which continued to be used for more than a century after Hürrem's death, conveys the great power held by concubines who had arrived at the Ottoman court as slaves, elevating their status above imperial princesses and making them equal to the wives of Europe's rulers.

As the position of the haseki sultan eroded over the course of the 17th century, the title was replaced by the less prestigious and non-exclusive kadın, a title related to the earlier hatun. Henceforth, the sultan's mother was the only woman of non-imperial blood to carry the sultan title.

The sultan title is often translated as "sultana" when referring to female members of the imperial family in order to distinguish them from the male ruler.

== Usage ==
The haseki sultan title was held by the chief consort of the sultan. She had a special standing in the palace, being the second most powerful woman in the imperial harem after the valide sultan and usually having chambers close to the sultan's own chamber.

When the position of the valide sultan was vacant the haseki sultan could take on the role, which meant having access to considerable economic resources, becoming head of the imperial harem, advising the sultan in matters of state, and even holding sway on international relations. This happened in different measures during the eras of Hürrem Sultan, Nurbanu Sultan, Safiye Sultan, and Gülnuş Sultan.

Hürrem, the first concubine to become haseki sultan, was given several exceptional rights during her tenure, particularly after the death of Suleiman's mother, Hafsa Sultan, in 1534. Hürrem was allowed to give birth to more than one son, which was a stark violation of the imperial harem's old principle of "one concubine-mother, one son" that was designed to prevent both the mother's influence over the sultan and the feuds of full-brothers for the throne. In 1534, Suleiman married Hürrem in a magnificent formal ceremony, making him the first Ottoman sultan to wed since Mehmed II (r. 1451–1481), and flouting the Ottoman dynasty's custom according to which sultans were not to marry their concubines (Mehmed's legal wife was a free noblewoman, Sittişah Hatun). Later, Hürrem became the first mother of a prince to remain at the sultan's court for the duration of her life; as per tradition, the mother of a prince was to remain in the harem only until her son came of age (around 16 or 17), when she would accompany him as he left the capital to govern a faraway province. Hürrem came to be Suleiman's partner not only in the household, but also in government affairs. Thanks to her intelligence, she acted as Suleiman's adviser, and seems to have had influence upon foreign policy.

A mother's political role traditionally began with the creation of a separate household for her son. The establishment of her public identity entailed her separation from the sultan and his court. This kind of functional division appears to have occurred with Nurbanu Sultan, in spite of the fact that she also never left the sultan's court; the shift in her position, that is, her candid undertaking of a political role as haseki sultan may well have coincided with her son's assumption of a provincial posting.

The haseki sultan title was not used during the reign of Mehmed III, which was probably due to the prominent role played by his mother, Safiye Sultan.

The title was used again during the reign of Mehmed's son, Ahmed I, who chose his second or third consort, Kösem, as haseki sultan. Her legacy is similar to that of Hürrem in one important aspect. Like Hürrem, Kösem is accused of acting to preserve her own power rather than that of the sultan or the dynasty. Perhaps Kösem's greatest triumph was the significant shift in the pattern of succession from a system of primogeniture to one based on agnatic seniority. She must have realized the personal gain that might stem from this change, as she would still have a son "in waiting" depite no longer being the haseki sultan. According to a Venetian ambassador, Kösem "lobbied to spare Mustafa the fate of fratricide with the ulterior goal of saving her own son[s] from the same fate". This new system resulted in all heirs being isolated in the kafes before ascending to the throne, hence the old age or mental issues of certain sultans upon their enthronement; it also made the princes lose the chance to govern a province, which was originally an essential part of their training to become a worthy ruler.

== Decline ==
Osman II might have had one or two haseki sultan, but little is known about his harem. (Note: According to Piterberg, Osman II did not have a haseki and the well-known Ayşe was just "a politically insignificant consort".)

As with Osman, very little is known about the concubines of his younger half-brother, Murad IV. Privy purse registers show the presence of one haseki, Ayşe, until the very end of Murad's seventeen-year reign, when a second unnamed haseki appears.

Ibrahim had eight haseki sultan, of whom the first three — Turhan, Muazzez and Dilaşub — each had one son who later became sultan.

The presence of more than one haseki sultan was a significant change, signaling that the age of the haseki was coming to an end. With Kösem's strong influence as valide sultan, the haseki sultan title being held by eight women simultaneously, and the change of the succession law, the haseki title lost its special status. In this period, its meaning began to shift from "chief consort" and "sole favorite" to something more general like "imperial consort".

Gülnuş Sultan was the last influential haseki sultan. She had a forceful personality and was very involved in politics, managing to persuade Mehmed IV to dismiss and execute his grand vizier Kara Mustafa Pasha in 1683. Her authority had previously lessened during the vizierate of Köprülüzade Ahmed Pasha (1661 to 1676), but increased again after Mustafa Pasha's execution and lasted until Mehmed IV's deposition in 1687.

In the late 17th century kadın became the highest-ranking title for imperial concubines. The last woman to use the haseki sultan title was Rabia Sultan, one of the two known concubines of Ahmed II.

== List of haseki sultan ==
The title was first used in the early 16th century for Hürrem Sultan, legal wife of Suleiman the Magnificent and mother of the future Selim II. It was next held by Nurbanu Sultan, favorite consort and possibly legal wife of Selim II, and mother of his acknowledged heir Murad III. In 1575, just after Murad III's accession, the title was bestowed upon Safiye Sultan. Leslie P. Peirce points out that during Mehmed III's reign, the haseki sultan title did not come in use. Mehmed's son Ahmed I gave it to Kösem Sultan, whom he might have also married; she was the mother of sultans Murad IV and Ibrahim, and dominated the politics of the Ottoman Empire during the early 17th century. Osman II might have had one haseki sultan, Ayşe Sultan. Recent research has additionally identified Kalender Sultan as a possible haseki of Osman II. Another Ayşe Sultan is recorded as Murad IV's only haseki sultan until the very end of his seventeen-year reign when a second haseki appears. Eight women held the title during Ibrahim's era: Turhan, Muazzez, Dilaşub, Ayşe, Mâhenver, Saçbağlı, Şivekar, and his legal wife, Hümaşah. Three of Ibrahim's sons became sultans; Mehmed IV had a haseki, Gülnuş Sultan; Suleiman II isn't known to have named one; and the most beloved of Ahmed II's two known concubines, Rabia Sultan, is the last woman who held the haseki sultan title.

| Portrait | Name | Birth name | Origin | Consort of | Ceased to be haseki | Death |
|---|---|---|---|---|---|---|
| | Hürrem Sultan | Aleksandra or Anastajza | Ruthenian | Suleiman I | 15 April 1558 | |
| | Afife Nurbanu Sultan | Cecilia Venier-Baffo or Kalē Karatanou or Rachel Marié Nassi | Venetian, Greek or Jewish | Selim II | 15 December 1574 sultan's death | 7 December 1583 |
| | Safiye Sultan | unknown | Albanian | Murad III | 15 January 1595 sultan's death | January/April 1619 |
| | Mahpeyker Kösem Sultan | Anastasía | Greek or Bosnian | Ahmed I | 22 November 1617 sultan's death | 2 September 1651 |
| | Ayşe Sultan (disputed) | unknown | unknown | Osman II | 20 May 1622 sultan's deposition | c. 1640 |
| | Kalender Sultan (disputed) | unknown | Circassian | Osman II | 20 May 1622 sultan's deposition | after 1685 |
| | Ayşe Sultan | unknown | unknown | Murad IV | 8 February 1640 sultan's death | 1679/1680 |
| | Unnamed consort | unknown | unknown | Murad IV | 8 February 1640 sultan's death | after 1640 |
| | Hatice Turhan Sultan | unknown | Russian or Circassian or Ukrainian | Ibrahim | 8 August 1648 sultan's deposition | 4 August 1683 |
| | Hatice Muazzez Sultan | unknown | unknown | Ibrahim | 8 August 1648 sultan's deposition | 12 September 1687 |
| | Saliha Dilaşub Sultan | Katarina | unknown | Ibrahim | 8 August 1648 sultan's deposition | 4 December 1689 |
| | Ayşe Sultan | unknown | Tatar | Ibrahim | 8 August 1648 sultan's deposition | after 1675 |
| | Mâhenver Sultan | unknown | Circassian | Ibrahim | 8 August 1648 sultan's deposition | after 8 August 1648 |
| | Saçbağlı Sultan | unknown | Circassian | Ibrahim | 8 August 1648 sultan's deposition | after 8 August 1648 |
| | Şivekar Sultan | Maria | Armenian | Ibrahim | 8 August 1648 sultan's deposition | 1693 |
| | Hümaşah Sultan | unknown | Georgian or Circassian | Ibrahim | 8 August 1648 sultan's deposition | after 1676 |
| | Emetullah Rabia Gülnuş Sultan | Evmania Voria Verzini | Greek or Venetian | Mehmed IV | 8 November 1687 sultan's deposition | 6 November 1715 |
| | Rabia Sultan | unknown | unknown | Ahmed II | 6 February 1695 sultan's death | 14 January 1712 |

== See also ==
- List of Ottoman titles and appellations
- List of mothers of the Ottoman sultans
- List of Ottoman imperial consorts
- Harem
- Ottoman Imperial Harem
- Valide sultan
- Kadın (title)
- Ikbal (title)
- Sultana (title)
