= Ibrahim of the Ottoman Empire =

Sultan of the Ottoman Empire from 1640 to 1648

Ibrahim
- Custodian of the Two Holy Mosques
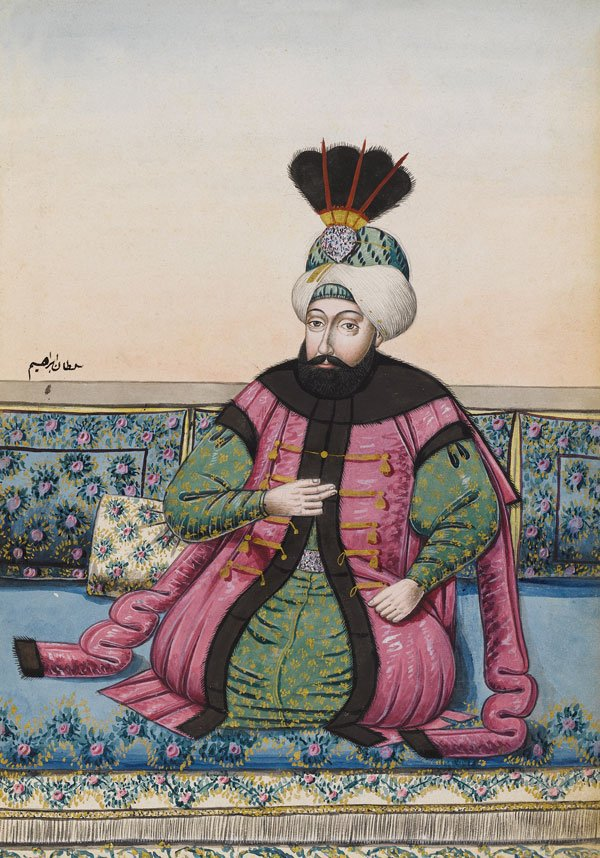
- Sultan Ibrahim in a oil painting c. 1640

Sultan of the Ottoman Empire (Padishah)
- Reign: 9 February 1640 – 8 August 1648
- Predecessor: Murad IV
- Successor: Mehmed IV
- Regent: Kösem Sultan (1640–1648)

Ottoman caliph (Amir al-Mu'minin)
- Predecessor: Murad IV
- Successor: Mehmed IV
- Born: 13 October 1617; Topkapı Palace, Constantinople, Ottoman Empire
- Died: 18 August 1648 (aged 30); Constantinople, Ottoman Empire
- Cause of death: Execution by strangulation
- Burial: Hagia Sophia, Istanbul, Turkey
- Consorts: Hatice Turhan Sultan; Hatice Muazzez Sultan; Saliha Dilaşub Sultan; Ayşe Sultan; Mâhenver Sultan; Saçbağı Sultan; Şivekar Sultan; Hümaşah Sultan; Others
- Issue Among others: Mehmed IV; Gevherhan Sultan; Suleiman II; Ahmed II
Names
- Ibrahim bin Ahmed
- Dynasty: Ottoman
- Father: Ahmed I
- Mother: Kösem Sultan
- Religion: Sunni Islam
- Tughra

Ibrahim (/ˌɪbrəˈhiːm/; Ottoman Turkish: ابراهيم; Turkish: İbrahim; 13 October 1617 – 18 August 1648) was the sultan of the Ottoman Empire from 1640 until his death in 1648.

He was born in Istanbul as the last son of sultan Ahmed I (1590–1617) and Kösem Sultan (1589–1651), also known as Mahpeyker Sultan, an ethnically Greek woman claimed to originally be named Anastasía.

He was called Ibrahim the Mad (Turkish: Deli İbrahim) due to his mental condition and behavior. However, historian Scott Rank notes that his opponents spread rumors of the sultan's insanity, and some historians suggest that he was more incompetent than mad.

== Early life ==
Ibrahim was born on 13 October 1617 as the last son of Sultan Ahmed I and his Haseki Kösem Sultan and when he was only an infant his father died and Ibrahim's uncle Mustafa I became the new sultan. Kösem Sultan and her children, including an infant Ibrahim, were sent to the Old Palace. After his brother Murad IV inherited the throne from his uncle Mustafa I, Ibrahim was confined in the Kafes, which affected his health. Murad had Ibrahim's two surviving half-brothers Şehzade Bayezid, Şehzade Süleyman and a few years later, one full-brother Şehzade Kasım executed and Ibrahim feared that he would be next, but after his older brother Murad's death, Ibrahim became Sultan.

== Reign ==
=== Accession ===
One of the most notorious Ottoman Sultans, Ibrahim spent all of his early life in the close confinement of the Kafes before succeeding his brother Murad IV (1623–40) in 1640. Three of their brothers had been executed by Murad, and Ibrahim lived in terror, expecting to be killed at any moment. His life was saved only by the intervention of Kösem Sultan, mother of Ibrahim and Murad.

Murad's death left Ibrahim as the sole surviving prince of the dynasty. Upon being asked by Grand Vizier Kemankeş Kara Mustafa Pasha to assume the Sultanate, Ibrahim suspected that Murad was still alive and plotting to trap him. It took the combined persuasion of Kösem and the Grand Vizier, and personal examination of his brother's dead body, to make Ibrahim accept the throne.

=== Early reign ===
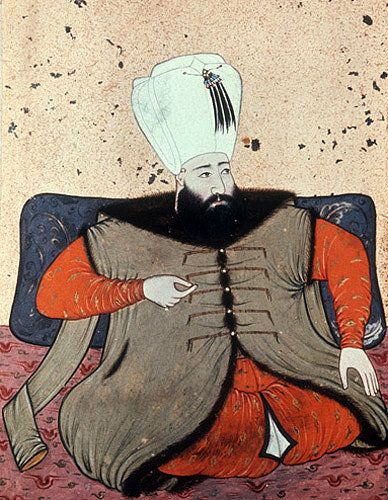
Portrait of Ibrahim from the Kebir Musavver Silsilenâme, by Abdulcelil Levni, c. 1710–20

During the early years of Ibrahim's reign, he retreated from politics and turned increasingly to his harem for comfort and pleasure. During his sultanate, the harem achieved new levels of luxury in perfumes, textiles and jewelry. His love of women and furs led him to have a room entirely lined with lynx and sable. His behavior caused political instability in the empire. He once started a large rebellion from several Ottoman Beylerbeyi (administrators) attempting to coerce the governor of Sivas into handing over Perihan Hanım, the wife of a Vizier for his personal harem (which would not be permissible in Islam). The resulting skirmishes between the Ottoman army and rioters even led to Köprülü Mehmed Pasha being captured by the rioters. Due to his infatuation with furs, the French dubbed him "Le Fou de Fourrures" ("The Madman of the Furs"). Kösem Sultan kept her son in check by supplying him with virgins that she personally purchased from the slave market, as well as overweight women, whom he craved.

An account of his reign is given by Demetrius Cantemir. He wrote of Ibrahim:

"As Murat was wholly addicted to wine, so was Ibrahim to lust. They say that he spent all his time in sensual pleasure and when nature was exhausted with the frequent repetition of venereal delights, he endeavoured to restore it with potions or commanded a beautiful virgin richly habited to be brought to him by his mother, the Grand Vezir, or some other great man. He covered the walls of his chamber with looking glasses [mirrors] so that his love battles might seem to be enacted in several places at once. He ordered his pillows to be stuffed with rich furs so that the bed designed for the Imperial pleasure might be the more precious. Nay, he put sable skins under him in a notion that his lust might be flamed if his love toil were rendered more difficult by the glowing of his knees."

Kara Mustafa Pasha remained the Grand Vizier during the first four years of Ibrahim's reign, keeping the Empire stable. With the Treaty of Sèvres (15 March 1642), he renewed peace with Austria and in the same year recovered Azov from the Cossacks. Kara Mustafa also stabilized the currency with coinage reform, sought to stabilize the economy with a new land-survey, reduced the number of janissaries, removed non-contributing members from the state payrolls, and curbed the power of disobedient provincial governors. During these years, Ibrahim showed concern with properly ruling the empire, as shown in his handwritten communications with the Grand Vizier. Kara Mustafa in turn wrote a memo on public affairs to coach his inexperienced master. Ibrahim's replies to Kara Mustafa's reports show that he had actually received a good education. Ibrahim often traveled in disguise, inspecting the markets of Istanbul and ordering the Grand Vizier to correct any problems that he observed.

=== Decadence and crisis ===
Ibrahim was often distracted by recurring headaches and attacks of physical weakness, perhaps caused by the mental trauma of his early years. Since he was the only surviving male member of the Ottoman dynasty, Ibrahim was encouraged by his mother Kösem Sultan to distract himself with harem girls and soon fathered three future sultans: Mehmed IV, Suleiman II and Ahmed II. The distractions of the harem allowed Kösem Sultan to gain power and rule in his name, yet even she fell victim to the Sultan's disfavor and left the Imperial Palace.

Ibrahim came under the influence of various unsuitable people, such as mistress of the imperial harem Şekerpare Hatun and the charlatan Cinci Hoca, who pretended to cure the Sultan's physical ailments. The latter, along with his allies Silahdar Yusuf Agha and Sultanzade Mehmed Pasha, enriched themselves with bribes and eventually usurped enough power to secure the execution of Grand Vizier Ḳara Muṣṭafā. Cinci Hoca became Kadiasker (High Judge) of Anatolia. Yusuf Agha became Kapudan Pasha (Grand Admiral) and Sultanzade Mehmed, Grand Vizier.

In 1644, the Knights of Malta seized a ship carrying high-status pilgrims to Mecca. Since the Knights had docked in Crete, Kapudan Yusuf Pasha encouraged Ibrahim to invade the island. This began 24 years of war with Venice. Crete did not completely fall under Ottoman domination until 1669. In spite of the decline of La Serenissima, Venetian ships won victories throughout the Aegean, capturing Tenedos (1646) and blockading the Dardanelles. Kapudan Yusuf enjoyed temporary success in conquering Canea, starting a jealous rivalry with Nevesinli Salih Pasha, the recently installed grand vizier. The rivalry led to Yusuf's execution (January 1646) soon after the Grand Vizier's deposition (December 1645).

With his cronies in power, Ibrahim's extravagant tendencies went unchecked. He raised eight concubines to the favored position of haseki sultan (royal consort), granting each riches and land. After legally marrying the concubine Telli Haseki Sultan, he ordered the palace of Ibrahim Pasha to be carpeted in sable furs and given to her.

== Deposition and execution ==
Mass discontent was caused by the Venetian blockade of the Dardanelles—which created scarcities in the capital—and the imposition of heavy taxes during a war economy to pay for Ibrahim's whims. In 1647 the Grand Vizier Nevesinli Salih Pasha, Kösem Sultan, and the şeyhülislam Abdürrahim Efendi unsuccessfully plotted to depose the sultan and replace him with one of his sons. Salih Pasha was executed, and Kösem Sultan was exiled from the harem.

The next year, the Janissaries and members of the ulema revolted. On 8 August 1648, corrupt Grand Vizier Ahmed Pasha was strangled and torn to shreds by an angry mob, gaining the posthumous nickname "Hezarpare" ("thousand pieces"). On the same day, Ibrahim was seized and imprisoned in Topkapı Palace. Kösem gave consent to her son's fall, saying "In the end, he will leave neither you nor me alive. We will lose control of the government. The whole society is in ruins. Have him removed from the throne immediately."

Ibrahim's six-year-old son Meḥmed was made sultan. The new grand vizier, Sofu Mehmed Pasha, petitioned the sheikh ul-Islam for a fatwā sanctioning Ibrahim's execution. It was granted, with the message "if there are two caliphs, kill one of them." Kösem also gave her consent. Two executioners were sent for; one being the chief executioner who had served under Ibrahim. As the executioners drew closer, it was reported that Ibrahim's last words were: "Is there no one among those who have eaten my bread who will take pity on me and protect me? These cruel men have come to kill me. Mercy! Mercy!" As his mother, Kösem Sultan, and officials watched from a palace window, Ibrahim was strangled on 18 August 1648. His death was the second regicide in the history of the Ottoman Empire.

== Family ==
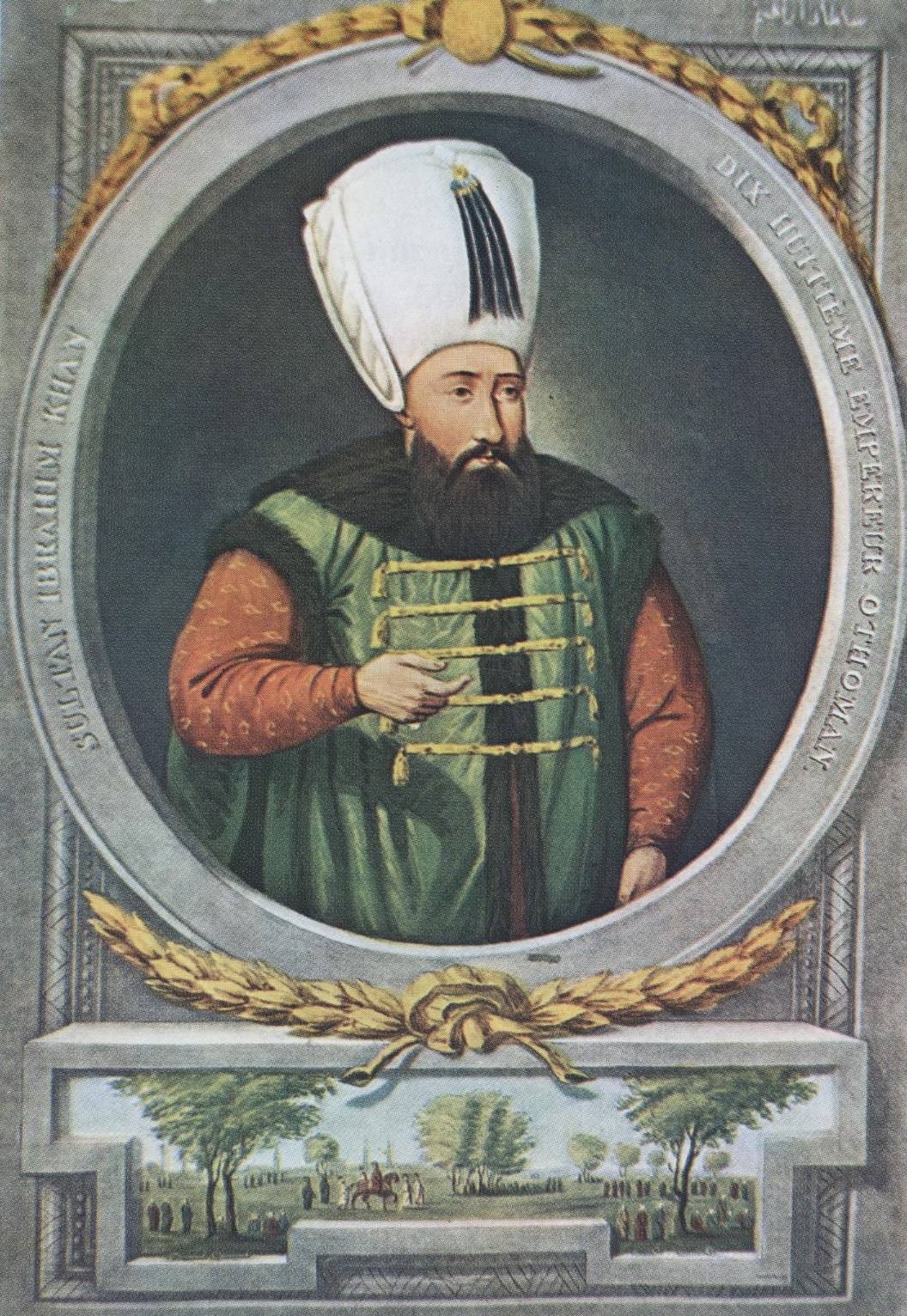
Ibrahim, depicted posthumously by Konstantin Kapıdağlı, turn of the 18/19th century

In addition to his eight Haseki Sultans (the first and only certain case of the coexistence of several Haseki sultan at the same time and a symptom of the loss of prestige and exclusivity of the title which began under Murad IV) he had a large number of concubines, of which only some are known. However, only Şivekar Sultan and Hümaşah Sultan, who also became his legal wife, had any real political power or influence over the sultan. Ibrahim was particularly famous for his brief but intense love obsessions, often with women who were not part of his harem and that he had his agents commandeer around the city.

Other anecdotes related to his harem are Ibrahim's supposed passion for obese women, which would have led Şivekar, called "the fattest woman at Constantinople", to become his favorite, and the story that he drowned 280 concubines in his harem because of a rumor that one of them had had a forbidden relationship with a man, an anecdote however rejected by several historians as invented or exaggerated.

=== Consorts ===
Ibrahim I had seven or eight Haseki sultan (seven according to Evliya Çelebi, eight according to Ahmed Refik, the archival research confirming Evliya's information), the last of whom was also his legal wife, plus a number of known and unknown minor concubines:

==== Haseki sultan ====
All of Ibrahim's Haseki sultan received 1,000 aspers a day except for Saliha Dilaşub Sultan who received 1,300 aspers a day. Ibrahim gifted the incomes of Bolu, Hamid, Nicopolis Sanjaks, and Syria Eyalet to Saliha Dilaşub, Mahienver, Saçbağlı, and Şivekar, respectively. He also lavished the treasury of Egypt upon Saçbağlı Sultan and Hümaşah Sultan, and presented the Ibrahim Pasha Palace to Hümaşah. His known consorts were:

- Hatice Turhan Sultan. She was the first Haseki Sultan of Ibrahim (Baş Haseki Sultan) and mother, Valide Sultan and official regent of the Ottoman Empire during the reign of her son Mehmed IV. She was either of Russian, Circassian or Ukrainian origin. After her son's accession to the throne, and after the assassination of Kösem Sultan, she undertook the complete control over the Ottoman Empire as Official Regent from the assassination of Kosem in 1651 to her resignation in 1656, acting as the "de facto" ruler of the Empire, similar to a Sultan. Under her regency, Ottoman Empire saw campaigns like Crete campaign, and she acted as the patrone of arts and as an effective ruler. She and Kosem are the only women who ever ruled the Ottoman Empire with Supreme authority, similar to that of an Ottoman Sultan. She protected Ibrahim's remaining children from execution, resulting in the definitive abandonment of the Law of Fratricide. Moreover, she was the longest reigning Valide Sultan in the Ottoman history, for over 35 years.
- Hatice Muazzez Sultan. She was the second Haseki Sultan of Ibrahim (İkinci Haseki Sultan) and mother of Ahmed II. She, along with Dilaşub Sultan and other Hasekis, was exiled to the Old Palace when Mehmed IV ascended the throne. Muazzez died in a fire at the Old Palace which took place during Suleiman II's reign; so, she did not see her son's installation and wasn't named as Valide Sultan.
- Saliha Dilaşub Sultan, also called Aşub or Aşube Sultan. She was the third Haseki Sultan of Ibrahim (Üçüncü Haseki Sultan) and mother and Valide Sultan of Suleiman II; she was Ibrahim's first concubine and was of Serbian origin. She and her son were planned to replace Turhan Sultan and her son Mehmed IV as Valide Sultan and as the reigning Sultan, upon project of Kösem Sultan (to eliminate Turhan and thereby, Kosem could have effectively ruled as unopposed regent), but her assassination prevented it. Dilaşub was exiled to the Old Palace by Turhan after she undertook the regency of the Empire, while keeping her son in Topkapi Palace and also protecting him from execution attempts. When Mehmed IV was deposed in 1687, Suleiman II finally became Sultan and Saliha, now the Valide Sultan, lived as such for only two years until her death.
- Ayşe Sultan (died after 1675). She was the fourth Haseki Sultan of Ibrahim (Dördüncü Haseki Sultan), titled as such in January 1645. She was of Tatar origins.
- Mâhenver Sultan. She was the fifth Haseki Sultan of Ibrahim (Beşinci Haseki Sultan) and appeared as the Sultan's consort first in 1645, being mentioned then on 2 May 1646. She was of Circassian origin.
- Saçbağı Sultan. She was the sixth Haseki Sultan of Ibrahim (Altıncı Haseki Sultan), of Circassian origin. Little is known about her, but she was an influential, authoritarian and extravagant wife. She was gifted with the income of the Sanjak of Nicopolis and part of the so-called "treasury of Egypt". She and the Sultan had two children, Şehzade Selim and Bican Sultan.
- Şivekar Sultan. Originally named as Maria, she was the seventh Haseki Sultan of Ibrahim (Yedinci Haseki Sultan), was of Armenian descent, daughter of a rich Armenian merchant and was known as "the fattest woman in the capital"; she was also one of the only two politically active consorts of Ibrahim. She was granted lands in Damascus by the Sultan and acted as advisor to him during his reign. She and the Sultan had one son and she was banished to the Old Palace after Ibrahim's execution, where she died in 1693, outliving Turhan, Dilaşub, Muazzez and even Turhan's son Mehmed IV and Dilaşub's son Suleiman II.
- Hümaşah Sultan. She was the eighth and last Haseki Sultan of Ibrahim (Sekizinci Haseki Sultan) and was Ibrahim's only legal wife. After the wedding, she was nicknamed as "Telli Haseki". Upon her marriage, the Sultan handed her the treasury of Egypt as a dowry and gifted her Ibrahim Pasha's former palace. He also banished his sisters Ayşe and Fatma, as well as his niece Kaya, accusing them of having insulted his new wife and of not having served her in a suitable way. They had a son who died in 1650. Moreover, she was one of the only two politically active consorts of Ibrahim and after his death, along with the other Hasekis, was banished to the Old Palace. In 1672, she remarried the Kaymakam of Constantinople, Ibrahim Pasha.

==== Concubines ====
- Zafire Hatun, called also Zarife. Georgian concubine. While he was still a prince, she became pregnant in violation of the rules of the harem. Kösem Sultan, Ibrahim's mother, handed her over to the kızları agasi Sümbül Ağa and ordered for her to be drowned, but the man hid her in his house, where she gave birth to her son Osman. Having discovered this, Kösem exiled them to Egypt, but their ship was attacked by the Knights Hospitaller and Zafire and Osman were taken to Malta, where Zafire died shortly afterwards.
- Hubyar Hatun. One of the concubines Ibrahim became infatuated with for a while. She was then released and given in marriage to Ibrahim Ağa.
- Şekerpare Hatun. Before one of Ibrahim's concubines, she then became musahibe (companion), treasurer and hostess of the harem.
- Sakizula Hatun.
- Şekerbanu Hatun.
- Hatice Hatun.
- The wife of the Grand Vizier Hezarpare Ahmed Paşah. After having fallen in love with her, Ibrahim forced her to divorce her husband. In return, both Ahmed Pasha and his son received a daughter of Ibrahim as a wife, respectively the little Beyhan Sultan, at the time one year (according to some sources she was later raised by his ex-wife), and Safiye Sultan, the eldest.
- The daughter of Şeyhülislam Muid Ahmed Efendi. According to A. L. Castellan, Ibrahim had sought her for his harem, but her father objected, so the sultan had her kidnapped from the baths, and then sent her home after some time.

=== Sons ===
Ibrahim I had at least ten sons:

- Osman / Şehzade Fulan (before 1640 or 2 January 1642, Constantinople – 25 October 1676, Malta) – with Zafire Hatun. Conceived while Ibrahim was still Şehzade in violation of the rules of the harem. Kösem Sultan, mother of Ibrahim, ordered that the pregnant mother be drowned. She was saved from the kızları agasi and gave birth to a son, who became known as "the bastard of the black eunuch". Having discovered this, Kösem exiled the three to Egypt, but the ship was attacked. The child was taken to Malta, where he later converted to Christianity and changed his name to Domenico di San Tommaso and came to be known as Domenico Ottomano or Padre Ottomano. It has been disputed whether Osman was fathered by Ibrahim or by someone else.
- Mehmed IV (2 January 1642, Constantinople – 6 January 1693, Edirne) – with Turhan Sultan. 19th Sultan of the Ottoman Empire. For the first 3 years of his reign, Ottoman Empire was ruled by his grandmother Kösem Sultan and the next 5 years by his mother Turhan Sultan. He was the second longest reigning sultan in Ottoman history after Suleiman the Magnificent and it was under his reign, Ottomans saw the greatest expansion in Europe which ultimately led to the Battle of Vienna which the Ottomans lost and thereby starting the Great Turkish War ending the Ottoman hegemony in Europe.
- Suleiman II (15 April 1642, Constantinople – 22 June 1691, Edirne) – with Saliha Dilaşub Sultan. 20th Sultan of the Ottoman Empire. His reign oversaw the continuation of Great Turkish war.
- Ahmed II (25 February 1643, Constantinople – 6 February 1695, Edirne) – with Muazzez Sultan. 21st Sultan of the Ottoman Empire. His reign also oversaw the final phase of the Great Turkish war. Under his successor Mustafa II, the Great Turkish War finally ended.
- Şehzade Murad (April 1643, Constantinople – 16 January 1644, Constantinople).
- Şehzade Selim (19 March 1644, Constantinople – September 1669, Constantinople or Edirne) – with Saçbağı Sultan. He lived and died in the Kafes.
- Şehzade Osman (August 1644, Constantinople – 1646, Constantinople).
- Şehzade Bayezid (1 May 1646, Constantinople – August 1647, Constantinople).
- Şehzade Cihangir (14 December 1646, Constantinople – 1 December 1648, Constantinople) – with Şivekar Sultan;
- Şehzade Orhan (October 1648, Constantinople – January 1650, Constantinople) – with Hümaşah Sultan.

At one point, Ibrahim took a great liking to the infant son of a slave woman (sometimes claimed to be the same person as Osman / Padre Ottomano), to the extent of preferring the unrelated child to his son Mehmed. Turhan, Mehmed's mother, grew extremely jealous and vented her anger at Ibrahim, who flew into a rage and grabbed Mehmed from Turhan's arms and threw him into a pool. Mehmed would have drowned if a servant had not rescued him. He was left with a permanent scar on his forehead.

=== Daughters ===
According to Uluçay, Ibrahim I had at least three daughters: Fatma, Geverhan and Beyhan:

- Fatma Sultan (between September and December 1642, Constantinople – 1657) – possibly with Muazzez Sultan. In 1645 she married Musahip Silahdar Yusuf Paşah, who was executed on 22 January 1646. A month later, her father married her to Musahib Fazlı Paşa, who Ibrahim exiled a couple of months after while causing to divorce them. She was buried in the Yeni Valide mosque. Turhan Sultan took care of her grave.
- Gevherhan Sultan (1642, Constantinople – 27 October 1694, Edirne) – with Muazzez Sultan. She was married three times: to Cafer Pasha on 23 November 1646, to Admiral of the Fleet and vizier Çavușzade Mehmed Pasha (died 1681), and to Helvacı Yusuf Pasha (died 1714) on 13 January 1692.
- Beyhan Sultan (1645, Constantinople – 15 September 1700, buried in Süleyman I Mausoleum, Süleymaniye Mosque) – perhaps with Turhan Sultan. She was married four times: to Kücük Hasan Pasha in 1646, to Grand Vizier Hezarpare Ahmed Pasha (murdered 1648) in 1647, to Uzun Ibrahim Pasha (executed 1683), and to Bıyıklı Mustafa Pasha (died 1699) in 1689. By her fourth marriage she had a son, Sultanzade Hüseyin Bey (1690–1754).

According to other sources:

- Safiye Sultan (1641, Constantinople – 1701). She married Baki Bey, son of the Grand Vizier Hezarpare Ahmed Paşah by his first wife.
- Atike Sultan (January 1644, Constantinople – before 1693) – with Turhan Sultan. She was married three times: to Sarı Kenan Pasha (executed 1659) in 1648, to Boşnak İsmail Pasha (killed 1664) in 1659, and to Gürcü Mehmed Pasha in 1665.
- Ümmügülsüm Sultan (1643, Constantinople – 1655). She was called also Ümmi Sultan. She was married in 1653 to Abaza Ahmed Pasha (died 1656). She died soon after the wedding.

==== Others ====
According to unspecified sources:

- Ayşe Sultan (1646, Constantinople – 1675, Cairo). She married Defterdar Ibrahim Paşah, governator of Cairo, and was widowed in 1664. She finally married her cousin, the governor of Buda and Cairo Sultanzade Canbuladzade Hüseyn Pasha, son of Fatma Sultan.
- Kaya Sultan (1645, Constantinople – after 1661). She married Haydarağazade Mehmed Paşa in 1649, who was executed in 1661.
- Hatice Sultan. Died in infancy.
- Bican Sultan (died 1675). She was born posthumously as Ibrahim's last child. She was proposed in marriage to Kuloğlu Musahip Mustafa Paşah, but he refused her (he would later marry Mehmed IV's daughter, Hatice Sultan, in 1675). She was then married to Cerrah Kasım Paşah, in January 1666.

== In popular culture ==
The tragic play Ibrahim, the Thirteenth Emperor of the Turks, written by Mary Pix and first performed in 1699, purported to describe incidents in Ibrahim's life. The numbering is correct only if Mehmed the Conqueror is regarded as the First Emperor, and the disputed reign of his son Cem is counted as well.

In the Turkish series Muhteşem Yüzyıl: Kösem he is portrayed by actor Ridvan Aybars Duzey as a prince and by Tugay Mercan as a Sultan.

In the film Three Thousand Years of Longing (2022), Ibrahim is portrayed by Jack Braddy, with Hugo Vella as him as a child.

Ibrahim House of Osman Born: 13 October 1617 Died: 18 August 1648
Regnal titles
Preceded by Murad IV	Sultan of the Ottoman Empire; 9 February 1640 – 8 August 1648	Succeeded by Mehmed IV
