= Turhan Sultan =

Valide Sultan of the Ottoman Empire from 1648 to 1683

- Nâib-i-Saltanat; Vâlide-i Sagīr; Valide Sultan
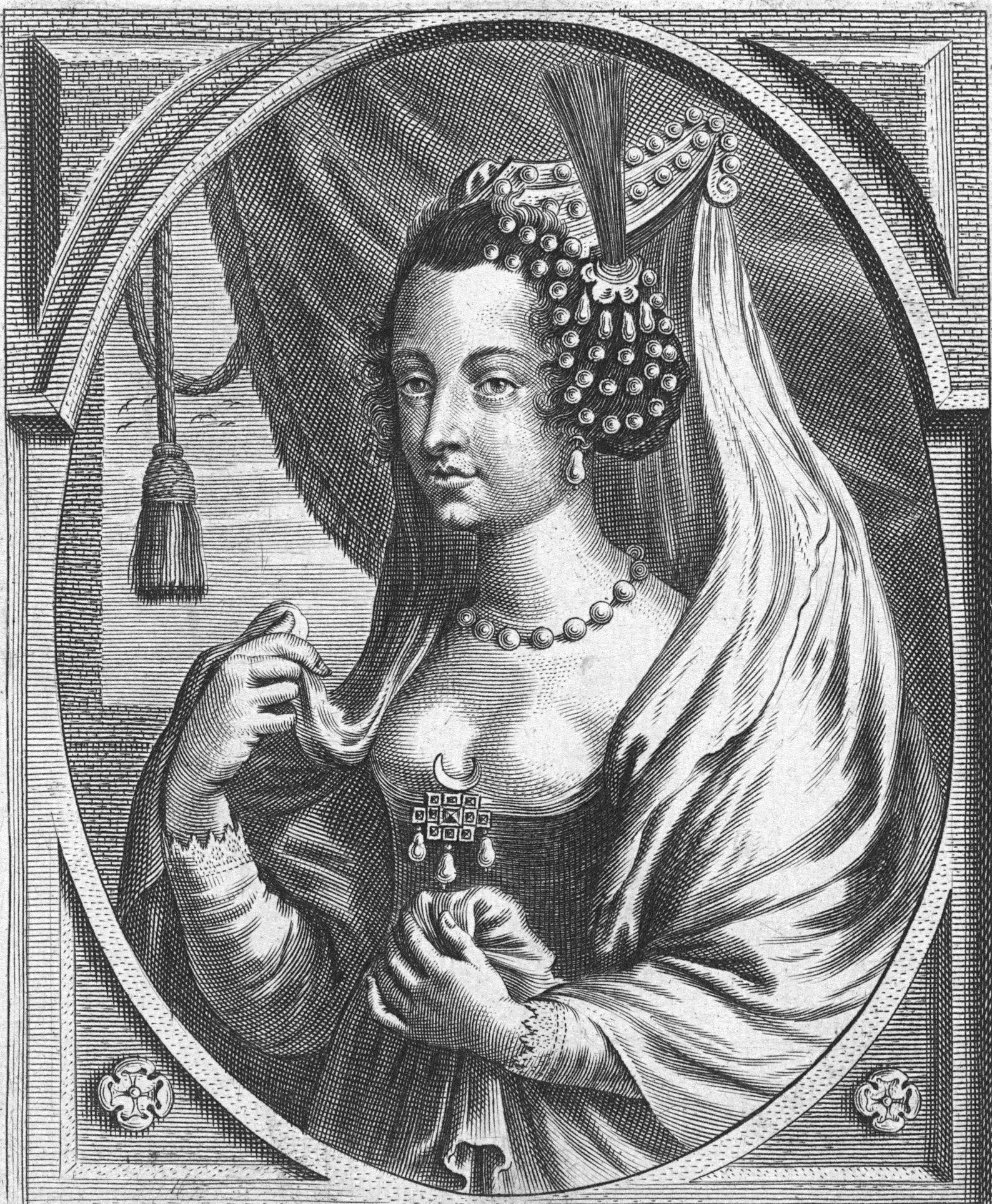
- Engraving by Pieter de Jode II.

Valide Sultan of the Ottoman Empire
- Tenure: 8 August 1648 – 4 August 1683
- Predecessor: Kösem Sultan
- Successor: Saliha Dilaşub Sultan
- Co-Valide: Kösem Sultan (1648 – 1651)

Nâib-i-Saltanat of the Ottoman Empire (Regent of the Ottoman Empire)
- Regency: 2 September 1651 – 2 June 1656
- Monarch: Mehmed IV

Haseki Sultan of the Ottoman Empire
- Tenure: 2 January 1642 – 8 August 1648
- Predecessor: Ayşe Sultan; Unnamed Second Haseki
- Successor: Gülnuş Sultan
- Born: c. 1627
- Died: 4 August 1683 (aged 55–56); Edirne, Ottoman Empire
- Burial: Tomb of Turhan Sultan, Istanbul
- Consort of: Ibrahim
- Issue more...: Mehmed IV
Names
- Turkish: Hatice Turhan Sultan; Ottoman Turkish: تورخان سلطان
- House: Ottoman
- Religion: Sunni Islam previously Eastern Orthodox Christian
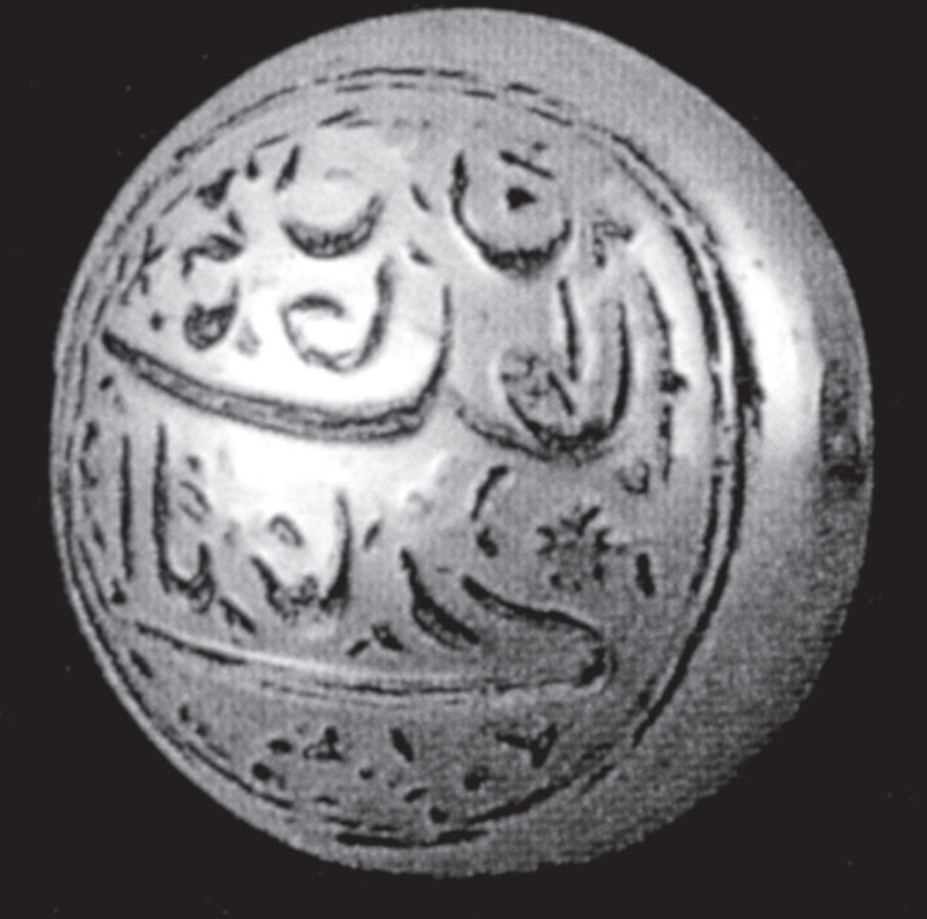
- Seal

Turhan Sultan (Ottoman Turkish: تورخان سلطان; c. 1627 – 4 August 1683) was Haseki Sultan as one of the eight senior consorts of Ottoman sultan Ibrahim, and Valide Sultan as the mother of Mehmed IV. She served as official regent of the Ottoman Empire, from 1651 to 1656 and as de facto ruler of the Empire for over three decades.

Turhan was prominent for the regency of her young son and her building patronage. Turhan and Kösem Sultan are the only two women in Ottoman history to be regarded as official regents and had supreme control over the Ottoman Empire. As a result, Turhan became one of the prominent figures during the era known as the Sultanate of Women.

Turhan was the youngest woman to have became the Valide Sultan at just twenty one years old and tenured for thirty five years, the longest duration any woman that had held the title of Valide Sultan. Unlike her predecessor, Turhan ruled at the same position as the Sultan and during her regency, she stabilised the political situation, resolved the financial crisis due to the Cretan War (1645–1669). Her regency ended after she had appointed Köprülü Mehmed Pasha as the Grand Vizier, and left all her power to him.

Following her regency, Turhan focused on patronage and became one of the greatest patronesses among the Ottoman women. She commissioned the Yeni Mosque, originally started by Safiye Sultan, the mother of Mehmed III, Turhan completed the project and thus became the first Ottoman imperial woman to have built a mosque. She also was the first woman to have built fortresses since the time of Mehmed II. Her death marked the end of Sultanate of Women.

== Name ==
Filiz Karaca, the author of the article about Turhan in the Islamic Encyclopedia, noted that although it was stated that Kösem Sultan gave her the name Hatice Turhan, the Ottoman historian and contemporary of Turhan Uşşakızade Ibrahim Efendi wrote that she was first given the name Turhan/Tarhan (Turkish: Turhan/Tarhan) and only then Hatice. Karaca also noted that in older sources she was called Turhan Hatice, while in newer studies she is referred to as Hatice Turhan. The Ottoman historian Süreyya Mehmed Bey called her Turhan Hatice Valide Sultan.

Turkish historian Necdet Sakaoğlu titled the section about her in his book Bu mülkün kadın sultanları «Valide Hatice Turhan Sultan», noting that in the sources she is mentioned as Turhan Haseki, Hatice Turhan Sultan and Turhan Valide Sultan, and on the cesme fountain built by her in Beşiktaş, her name is indicated as Hatice Sultan.

Ottomanist Anthony Alderson, Turkish historian Çağatay Uluçay and American history professor Leslie Peirce indicated only one name option - Hatice Turhan Sultan; Uluçay, like Karaca, noted that Kösem personally gave her the name.

== Origins ==
Filiz Karaca wrote that Turhan was rumored to be of Russian origin, born in 1627, captured at the age of twelve during the Crimean–Nogai slave raids in Eastern Europe and given via the Crimean slave trade to Kösem Sultan by Kör Süleyman Pasha. This version was also supported by Çağatay Uluçay. Necdet Sacaoğlu wrote that Turhan was supposedly born in 1627 in the territory of Russia; Sakaoğlu based this assumption about the year of birth on the fact that when Turhan Sultan gave birth to a son in 1642, she could not have been younger than 15 years old. Anthony Alderson, without giving any details, wrote that she was born in 1627. The Turkish historian Ahmet Refik Altınay in his work «The Age of Sables» (Turkish: Sarnur Devri) called her «the Russian brunette», describing her as a slender, fair-haired and fair-skinned girl with blue eyes; Sakaoğlu noted that this description is probably unreliable, since it is based on portraits painted long after her death. Uluçay wrote that Turhan was very beautiful: tall, slender, with dimples on her cheeks that further emphasized her beauty, with white skin, deep blue eyes and dazzlingly shiny chestnut hair.

The French traveler Jean-Baptiste Tavernier, returning from a trip to the East in 1668, stopped in Istanbul and wrote in his memoirs that the son of Ibrahim and a «Circassian woman» was on the throne.

According to the modern Ukrainian historian Taras Chukhlib, Turhan was born in Ukraine in the 1620s. The version about Ukrainian origin was also expressed by Halime Doğru: she wrote that during the Sultan’s campaign against Poland in 1673, Turhan «visited the lands where she was born, Ukraine – breathed the air of her homeland and perhaps met with her family».

Ahmed Refik Altınay in his book «Life in Istanbul in the Twelfth Century» and the Ottoman scholar Anthony Alderson who cites him mentioned that Turhan Sultan was a Muslim and had a brother, Yusuf Aga, who died in 1689. Filiz Karaca also mentioned that Turhan had a brother, Yusuf.

Filiz Karaca noted that the future Haseki was brought up in the harem, and received her palace education under the supervision of Atike Sultan. At the same time, Uluçay wrote that Kösem Sultan personally raised the concubine in order to present her to her son, the Sultan, as soon as possible. Peirce wrote that Turhan, brought to the capital by Kör Süleyman Pasha, was educated in the house of Atike, but was raised by Kösem, who initially prepared the girl to become the next Valide Sultan and therefore taught her not only the intricacies of the harem, but also the politics of the state.

== As imperial consort ==
Sakaoğlu wrote that Turhan Sultan managed to shine on the stage entirely due to luck: the only surviving Ottoman Şehzade, Ibrahim, ascended the throne, and Turhan herself became the first to cross the finish line in the race to give birth to the new sultan’s first Şehzade on 1 or 2 January 1642 - she, like the other dozen concubines, was forced into this race by Kösem Sultan who, worried about an heir's absence, ordered various amulets to be written, and had medicines and potions prepared. Karaca noted that Turhan Sultan was the very first concubine given to Sultan Ibrahim I, but it is that in reality the first concubine was Saliha Dilaşub. The birth of Turhan's son, Şehzade Mehmed, was celebrated with great pomp, as it removed the danger of the end of the Ottoman dynasty. Only 105 days later, also Saliha Dilaşub give birth a son, Şehzade Süleyman.

After giving birth to Mehmed IV, Turhan received the title of BaşHaseki. However, Sakaoğlu noted that she did not receive the corresponding position in the harem: on the one hand, this was due to Ibrahim's excessive lust for women, and on the other hand, the unlimited power in the harem of Kösem Sultan. Leslie Peirce wrote that Ibrahim ignored Turhan for most of his reign. Sakaoğlu believed that Ibrahim did not love the mother of his eldest son, which is also proven by an incident described by historians of the time:

“Sultan Ibrahim fell in love with a woman who came to the harem with her child to nurse Shehzade Mehmed. One day, when they were chatting lovingly in Mermerlik [the 4th courtyard of Topkapi], Turhan caught them. She reminded the Sultan, who had caressed the son of the woman, that he should treat his own Shehzade with kindness. The Sultan, angry with Turhan, threw Mehmed into a marble pool. Kösem Sultan intervened in the situation and threw the wet nurse out of the palace.”

At the same time, Uluçay noted that before the birth of his son, Ibrahim was in love with his haseki and did not notice other concubines, but being a great lover of women, he very quickly switched to other concubines. Mentioning the case with the wet nurse, Uluçay wrote that Ibrahim loved the wet nurse's child more than Şehzade Mehmed, and wanted to kill his son by throwing him into the pool. He also noted that at first Turhan was jealous of the sultan for other women, but over time, when Ibrahim completely switched to other concubines and the BaşHaseki was left to her own devices, she came to terms with her position. Leslie Peirce noted that in addition to Turhan, Ibrahim had 7 more hasekis and many simple concubines; moreover, until his marriage to Hümaşah Sultan, it was not the BaşHaseki who enjoyed the sultan's special favor, but the mother of Ibrahim's second son Suleiman, who is supposed to have been Ibrahim's favorite son Saliha Dilaşub Sultan, who received a salary of 1,300 akçe per day, while the other hasekis received only 1,000.

Karaca noted that the period of Turhan's tenure as a Haseki did not stand out in any way from other similar periods in history.

== As Valide Sultan ==
=== Mehmed's accession ===
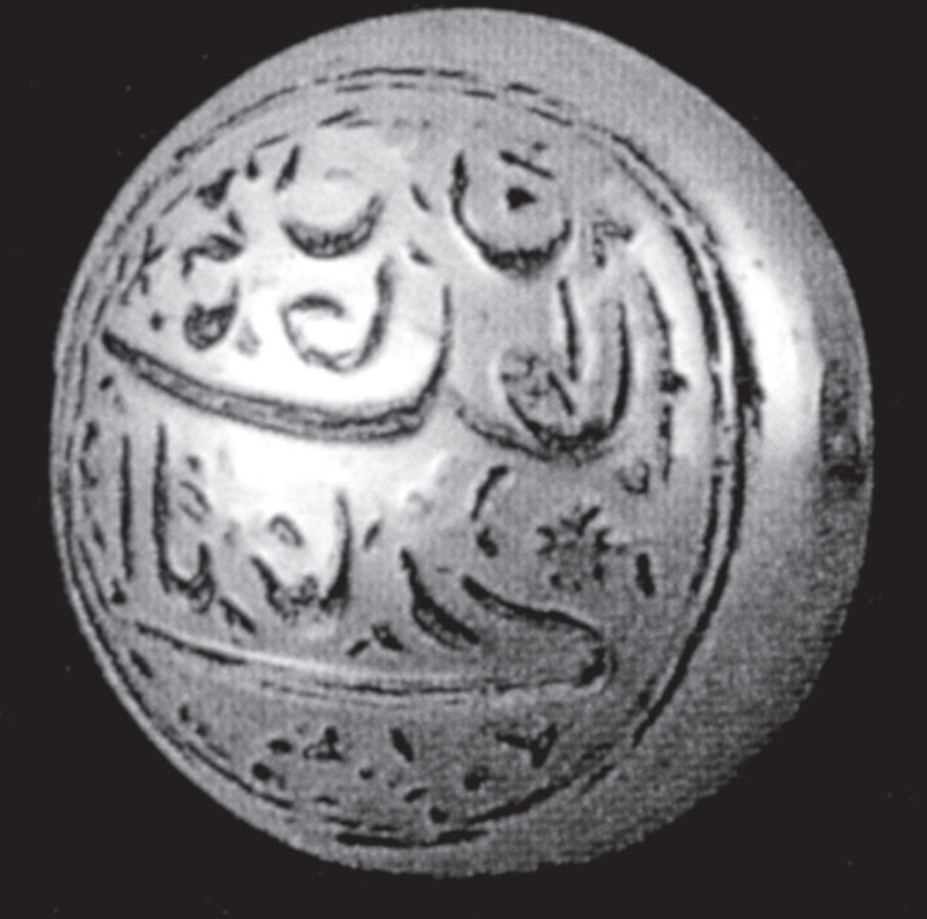
Pearl Seal of Turhan Sultan.

Ibrahim's behaviour sparked talks of deposing the sultan. On 8 August 1648, Ibrahim was dethroned and several days later, he was strangled. At the head of the Ottoman Empire stood the child sultan, Mehmed IV. With Mehmed's ascendancy, the position of Valide Sultan ("mother of the reigning sultan") should have gone to Turhan. However, Turhan was overlooked due to her youth and inexperience. Instead, the sultan's grandmother and the previous Valide sultan, Kösem Sultan, was reinstated to this high position. Kösem Sultan was a Valide (mother) under two sons, thus having the more experience of the two women.

However, Turhan turned out to be too ambitious a woman to lose such a high position without a fight. In her struggle to become Valide sultan, Turhan was supported by the chief black eunuch Lala Süleyman Agha in her household and the grand vizier, while Kösem was supported by the Janissary Corps. Although, Kösem's position as Valide was seen as the best for the government, the people resented the influence of the Janissaries on the government.

In this power struggle, Kösem planned to dethrone Mehmed and replace him with Şehzade Süleyman. According to one historian, this switching had more to do with replacing an ambitious daughter-in-law with Saliha Dilaşub, who was more easily controlled. The plan was unsuccessful as it was reported to Turhan by Meleki Hatun, one of Kösem's slaves. As N.M. Penzer describes it:

"[Turhan] Sultan was awakened, and an oath of allegiance was taken to serve and defend the young [Mehmed], who was still but a child. The mufti declared by a fetva that [Kösem] must die, and a decree was drawn up by the [grand vizier] and signed by the trembling hand of the young sultan. It was now the hour of [Turhan's] triumph, and a search was made in [Kösem's] suite without result. At last the wretched old woman was discovered hidden in a clothes-chest and dragged out to her death."

On the night of 2 September 1651, Kösem Sultan was murdered three years after becoming regent for Mehmed.

=== As regent ===
With the death of her rival, Turhan became the Valide Sultan. As a regent, Turhan wielded great power. She accompanied her son to important meetings and on several occasions spoke from behind her curtained sitting place. She was deeply loved and respected by her son. Due to her inexperience, Turhan relied on other members of the government to advise her on political matters. This is evident from her correspondence to the grand viziers.

==== Regency ====
Turhan Sultan, who assumed her Regency in 1651 upon the death of her mother-in law immediately raised her daily salary from 2,000 aspers a day to 3,000 aspres a day, around her neck she wore pearl seal with inscribed words Valide-I Gazi Sultan Mehmed Han (lit. The Mother of Warrior Sultan Mehmed Han) which was given to her when she became Valide Sultan.

She was able to stabilize the political chaos quickly that took place after the murder of Kösem Sultan, and brought the state into Peace. Unlike Kosem Sultan, she always consulted Ministers and Viziers for taking decisions and implementing those, for better administration and also due to her inexperience as she was only 24 years old, when she assumed the position of Regent. As Regent, she was frequently involved in State affairs, she headed the imperial council, took the decisions of the state, controlled the treasury and appointments of all statesmen and even Ulemma, implemented laws and signed documents, and headed the Ottoman Army in Military Campaign particularly during the Crete Campaign.

Tarhuncu Ahmed Pasha, who was appointed as the Grand Vizier during the reign of Sultan Mehmed IV, worked to conquer Crete, re-establish the navy and organize the state budget. Tarhuncu Ahmed Pasha, who became the Grand Vizier in 1652, limited the unnecessary gifts and gratuities given in order to balance the budget. Tarhuncu Ahmed Pasha, who tried to reduce palace expenses and prepared the fiscal year budget in advance for the first time, was executed for various reasons in 1653.

Turhan Sultan tried to establish a strong power after Kösem Sultan’s assassination. She tried to use the treasury and gunpowder resources, which were limited due to the Crete Campaign, to the best level. The Valide Sultan, who established a wide intelligence network, was interested in every event and checked the soldiers' salaries, the progress of the campaign and even whether the shipyard was running smoothly. It can be said that Turhan Sultan was one of the most powerful Valide Sultans of the Ottoman Empire through her 164 letters currently in Topkapı Palace.

==== Financial Crisis ====
Tarhuncu Ahmed Pasha set out to close the treasury deficit, eliminate the instability in the value of the currency, increase customs revenues, reduce palace and dockyard expenses, and prevent corruption. For this reason, those whose interests were harmed by Tarhuncu Ahmed Pasha's actions, both within the state and outside the state, began to become enemies and to sharpen their teeth against him. First, a group of ulema took action against the grand vizier, and in addition to them, bazaar tradesmen and the Kapıkulu sipahis, who had become accustomed to participating in all kinds of actions against the government of the day, joined this movement. These events were calmed down somewhat by appointing Bahai Efendi as the Sheikh-ul-Islam. For the first time in the Ottoman State, a board was established to learn the state's revenues and expenses in detail and to prepare a state budget. This board examined the state's books for approximately 10 years between 1643 and 1652, the last year of Kemankeş Kara Mustafa Pasha 's term as grand vizier. During this period, state revenues had become 5,329 burdens due to the introduction of new taxes (especially the "mill tax" and the "household tax"); state expenditures had been reduced from about 6,000 burdens in 1643 to about 5,500 burdens in 1650.

In addition, for the first time in the Ottoman State's financial system, a budget book called the Tarhuncu budget was prepared for the next year, that is, for the Hijri year 1060, which began in 1652. According to this budget, it was calculated that the total state income from the jizya, avarız, and mukataat fees coming from the provincial provinces in a year in Hijri 1060 would be 5,329 burdens. State expenditures would include the janissary corps, acemioğlan corps, gardener and baltacı ulufes, and the palace, shipyard, navy, istabl-i amire, cebecihane, gunhouse, etc. expenses, which would be 6,872 burdens. It was known that state budget problems constantly arose. According to the "Tarhuncu Budget", it was calculated that the state budget deficit for the Hijri year 1060 would be approximately 1,600 burdens. Although most of the budget problems arose from this budget deficit, it was also necessary to understand that some of them were short-term liquidity problems, that is, despite the continuous state expenditures, the revenues in the provinces were not collected on time, were not sent to the center at the planned time, and were not regular. After the detailed budget book was prepared, Tarhuncu Ahmed Pasha started to make cuts, especially in the spending of the palace and then of the state dignitaries. This cut in spending earned him many enemies.

On 20 November 1652, a fire broke out in Esir Han, close to the Istanbul markets, and caused great damage in the Çarşıkapı, Gedikpaşa, Çemberlitaş, Mahmutpaşa, Beyazıt and Mercan neighbourhoods, where the capital's markets were densely populated. This damage brought the problem of financial distress back to the agenda in the capital. In order to find short-term finance, the treasury officer borrowed 15 bags and granted the privilege of "Candle Emin" to a non-Muslim named "Devletoğlu". Baltacılar from the palace and the mansions of dignitaries began to erode Devletoğlu's shop, which was the administrative center, with requests for coffee, candles and sugar. This led to clashes between the baltacılar and Devletoğlu's men, and Devletoğlu was personally threatened with a beating. Finally, realizing that he could not cope with the problems, Devletoğlu disappeared without being able to get back the cash loan he had given to the treasury officer.

Sultan Mehmed IV was still a child. The state officials, even in the presence of the sultan, were constantly in fierce competition and even conflict with each other. Tarhuncu Ahmed Pasha's enemies, especially Turhan Sultan, were inciting the child sultan to take action against the grand vizier. Finally, the slander of these enemies that the grand vizier would dethrone the sultan united the courtiers and a decree was issued to remove Tarhuncu Ahmed Pasha from the position of grand vizier. On 21 March 1653, the day of Nevruz, while the grand vizier was in the shipyard for naval affairs after presenting the sultan with his New Year's gifts, he was invited to the palace and entered the Hasbahçe by sea, where he was welcomed by the girls' ağası (darüssaâde ağası) and received his grand vizier seal back. His term as grand vizier lasted for about 9 months. Koca Dervish Mehmed Pasha was appointed in his place.

The state was in great financial trouble and despite all the efforts and endeavors of the previous Grand Vizier Tarhuncu Ahmet Pasha, these problems could not be solved successfully. In order to prevent the state's affairs, especially its finances, from suddenly falling into disarray, Defterdar Zurnazen Mustafa Pasha was left in his place. However, since the financial situation did not improve and even showed signs of deterioration, Grand Vizier Koca Derviş Mehmed Pasha gave his chief servant Moralı Mustafa Ağa, whom he considered to be a state dignitary who held himself back, the title of beylerbeyi and appointed him as the Defterdar . However, the new Defterdar Moralı Mustafa was a greedy person and wanted to take over the office of Grand Vizier. For this reason, although he openly appeared loyal to the Grand Vizier, he began to work in his favor, first secretly but later on, and which the Grand Vizier learned about. To this end, he began to offer gifts and permissiveness to the palace and the mother sultan. This led to a significant crisis at the highest levels of the state, regency was marred by at least two factors: the war with the Venetians for the island of Crete, and the financial crisis that arose from the high expenses of waging war. Weak grand viziers did not improve the situation. However, in 1656 Köprülü Mehmed Pasha was appointed to the position of grand vizier. His condition upon accepting the post was that he be given greater authority than his predecessors. Thus, Turhan transferred her political power to that of the grand vizier, thus ending her Regency.

==== Post Regency ====
In 1657, during the long-term residence of Mehmed in Edirne due to the expeditions, Turhan Sultan was with him. During the short-term departure of Edirne, one of the viziers was appointed to supervise the sultan. She traveled to Istanbul from time to time while her son was on a long trip. It is known that a few years after the commencement of the round trips to Edirne, she built a flat (Avcı Sultan Mehmed Khan Apartment / Dolmabahçe Pavilion) in her palace in 1661. Turhan Sultan went to Babadağı with her son, who left Edirne and moved in the direction of Kamaniçe with a ceremony on 5 June 1672 for the Polish expedition.

The army decided to stay here until he returned from the expedition, and one of the dome viziers, İbrâhim Pasha, was commissioned with the guard. Meanwhile, her grandson Şehzade Mustafa (later Mustafa II), who was eight years old, was with her. However, her residence in Babadağı did not last until the return of the army. When the army arrived at Edirne, Turhan Sultan was in Istanbul. Mehmed sent the second vizier Mustafa Pasha to Istanbul to bring his mother before a week passed.

Gülnuş Sultan attempted to have her husband's brothers Suleiman II and Ahmed II strangled after Mustafa was born, but Turhan had hindered these attempted murders. Turhan is the youngest women to ever become Valide Sultan at 21 and remained as the longest serving Valide Sultan in the Ottoman history for over 35 years, suppressing even the reigns of many Ottoman Sultans. She was also the youngest women to ever assume the position of Regent in the Ottoman and in the Islamic history.

=== Patronage ===
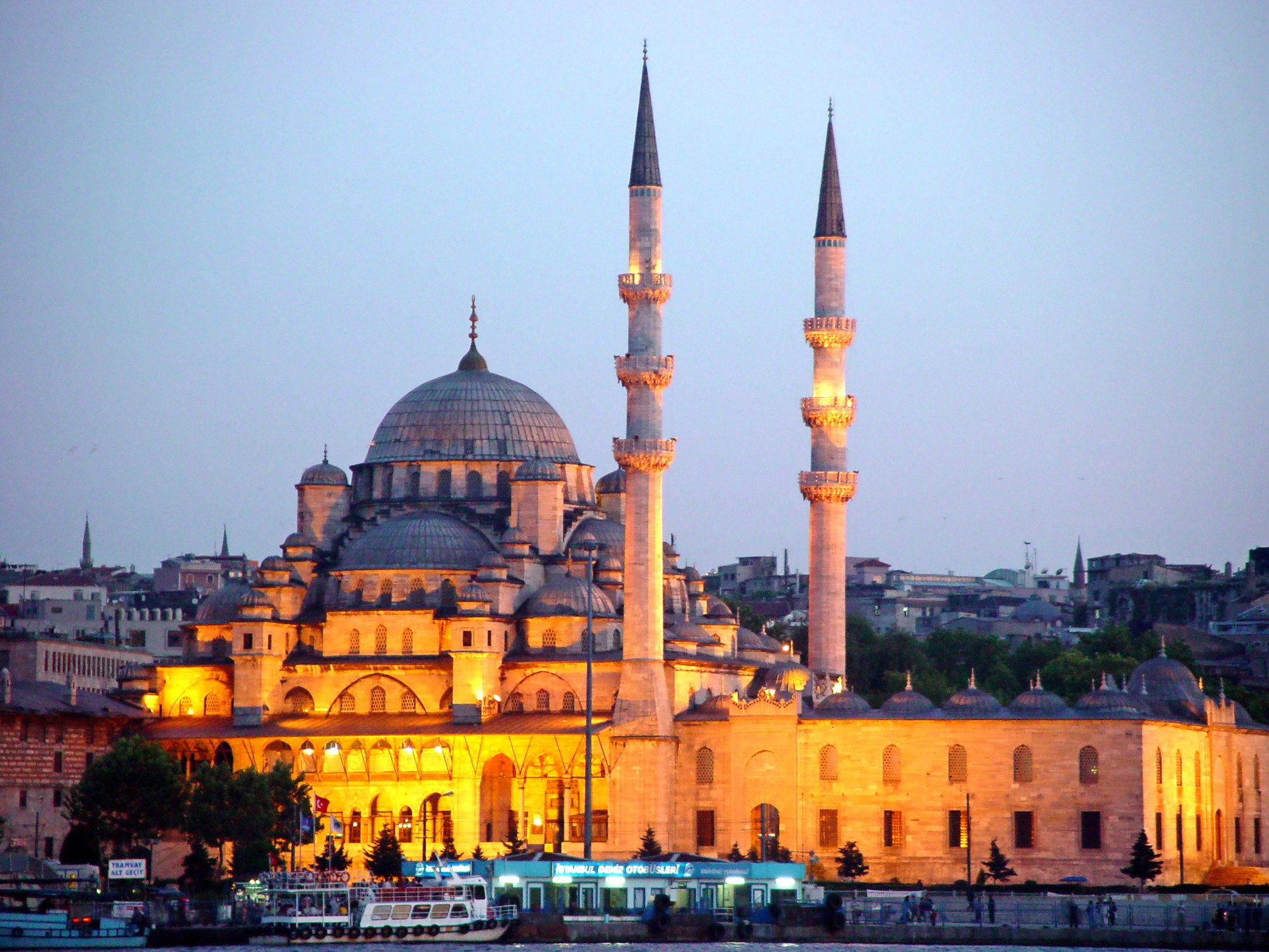
New Mosque, Istanbul was completed by the Turhan Sultan.

By providing the grand vizier with great authority, Turhan limited her own power on the political stage. However, she channeled her energies into other architectural projects.

She built a fountain in 1653 in Beşiktaş. Her first building project began in 1658. Perhaps in answer to the Venetian threat, the Valide built two fortresses at the entrance to the Dardanelles. The fortresses, one on the European side and the other on the Asian side, can still be seen today. Mehmed the Conqueror and other sultans also built fortresses in the same area, and was the first Ottoman woman to have built fortresses. Each of the fortresses contained a mosque, elementary schools, hamams and bazaars. Turhan had built wells in Hejaz, she also constructed a library in Çanakkale and Istanbul.

Turhan also built the Yeni Mosque in Istanbul. The initial construction was started by one of Turhan's predecessors, Safiye Sultan. She had chosen the commercial quarter of the city, Eminonü, as the location of the mosque. This area was inhabited by non-Muslims. By building a new mosque in Eminönü, Safiye wanted to Islamize the area. To build on this site meant that land had to be appropriated from the local non-Muslim residents, an act that had not gone smoothly. In the year 1597, the first stones were laid. At the death of Safiye's son, Mehmed III, the construction of the mosque stopped as she was no longer the Valide. The construction was abandoned for 57 years, but was restarted after the area was devastated by the Great Fire of 1660. Turhan decided to complete what had been started by Safiye Sultan. After its completion in 1665, the complex contained not only the mosque, but also a primary school, public fountains, a hospital, a market, and a tomb. The Yeni Mosque was the first imperial mosque built by a woman. On 31 October 1665, the mosque was opened and Turhan Sultan and Sultan Mehmed IV's consort Gülnuş Sultan attended the first prayer in the mosque.

In the southeast corner of the mosque, there is a need to pass to the majestic ruin and the sultan pavilion is arranged in three floors. The lower and middle floor cut-top stone has upper-level stone and brick walls that do not meet the needs of the brick. The pavilion, which is entered through a low arch door, has a long and ramped path. The palace, which has a long vaulted corridor underneath, is located on the upper floor, which is reserved for the sultan and the sultan, together with two hearth rooms. After the L-shaped hall and an intermediate space, the balcony in front of the building passes to the building. The walls in the Hünkâr pavilion are covered with herbal decorated tile panels in under-glaze technique.

Turhan was the last woman to wield such great power as to act as a regent to a young son. As women were not seen in public in the Ottoman Empire, it was through her patronage of building that Turhan showed herself to her subjects.

== Death ==
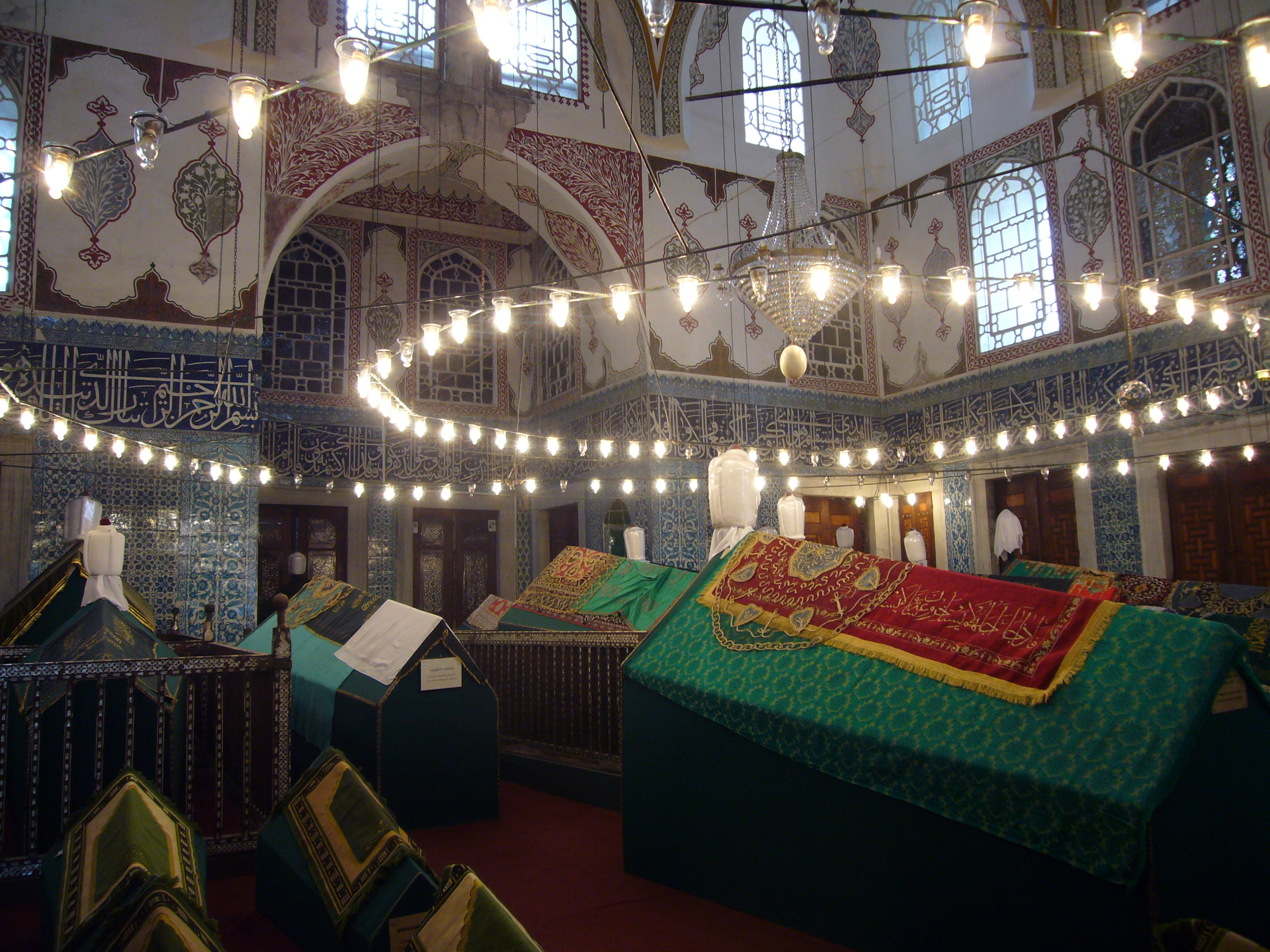
The tomb of Turhan Sultan is located near the Yeni Mosque in Eminönü, Istanbul.

Turhan Sultan died on 4 August 1683 at the age of 55–56, while she was staying in Edirne. Her body was brought back to Constantinople and was buried in the tomb named after her at the Yeni Mosque.

She lies alongside her son and her descendants. After her death her daughter in-law Gülnuş Sultan became the highest authority in the harem.

== Issue ==
Mehmed Süreyya Bey and Çagatay Uluçay name only one child of Turhan, Sultan Mehmed IV.

Filiz Karaca names only the son of Turhan, but she notes that there are references to a daughter of this valide.

In his work «Bu mülkün kadın sultanları» in the section about Turhan herself, Necdet Sakaoğlu, in addition to Mehmed, indicated that she had a daughter Atike Sultan (after 1642 – between 1666 and 1693); Anthony Alderson also adhered to this version. At the same time, Sakaoğlu in the section about the favorite of Mehmed IV Emetullah Gülnuş Sultan indicates that the Sultan had two full sisters Gevherhan Sultan (c./in 1642–1694) and Beyhan Sultan (1645–1700). According to Merve Çakır, Turhan was also the mother of Safiye Sultan and Ümmügülsüm Sultan.

== In popular culture ==
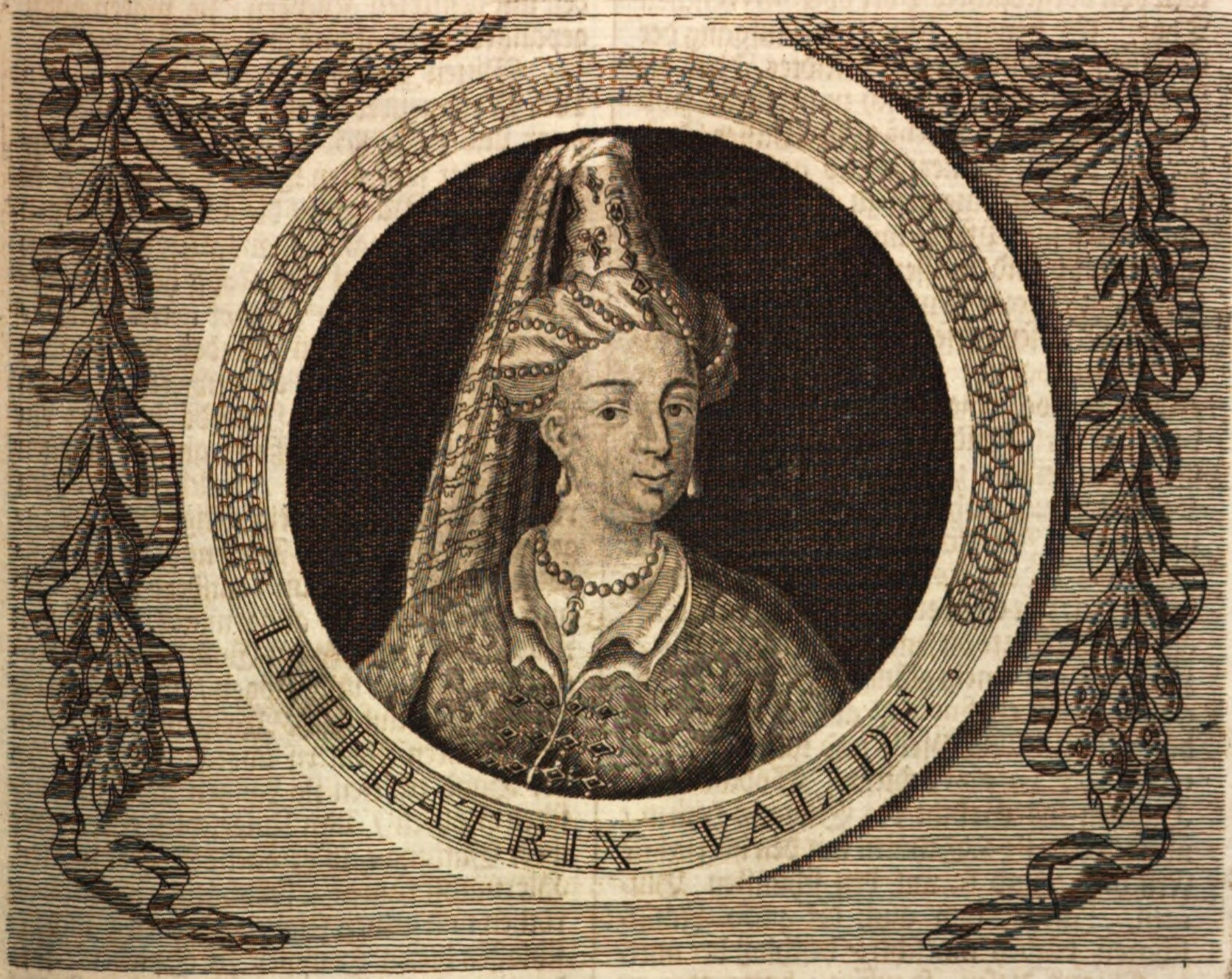
Portrait of Hatice Turhan Sultan. Attributed to Paul Rycaut, consul in Smyrna, 1660-67 (detail)

- In the 2010 film Mahpeyker: Kösem Sultan, Turhan is played by Turkish actress Başak Parlak.
- In the 2015 Turkish TV series Muhteşem Yüzyıl: Kösem, Turhan is played by Turkish actress Hande Doğandemir. In the series, she is the mother of Mehmed IV and Beyhan Sultan.

== See also ==
- Çınar Incident
- Ottoman dynasty
- Ottoman family tree
- List of Valide Sultans
- List of consorts of the Ottoman Sultans
- Sultanate of Women

== Sources ==
- Adıvar, Halide Edib; Hasan, Mushirul (2009). East Faces West: Impressions of a Turkish Writer in India. Academy of Third World Studies, Jamia Millia Islamia. p. 227. ISBN 978-8189833510.
- Alderson, Anthony Dolphin (1956). The Structure of the Ottoman Dynasty (PDF). Oxf.: Clarendon Press. p. 182.
- Baer, Marc David (2011). Honored by the Glory of Islam: Conversion and Conquest in Ottoman Europe. Oxford University Press. ISBN 9780199797837.
- Barzilai-Lumbroso, Ruth (2008). Turkish Men, Ottoman Women: Popular Turkish Historians and the Writing of Ottoman Women's History. pp. 206–214. ISBN 978-0549483557.
- Carsten, F. L. (1961). The New Cambridge Modern History. Vol. V. The Ascendancy of France, 1648–88. Cambridge University Press. pp. 505–506. ISBN 9780521045445.
- Cooke, Miriam; Göknar, Erdağ M.; Parker, Grant Richard (2008). Mediterranean passages: readings from Dido to Derrida. University of North Carolina Press. ISBN 9780807831830.
- Karaca, Filiz (2012). "Turhan Sultan". Islam Ansiklopedisi (in Turkish). Vol. 41. İslâm Araştırmaları Merkezi. pp. 423–425.
- Peirce, Leslie P. (1993). The Imperial Harem: Women and Sovereignty in the Ottoman Empire. Oxford University Press. ISBN 978-0-195-08677-5.
- Sakaoğlu, Necdet (2007). Famous Ottoman women. Istanbul: Avea. ISBN 978-975-7104-77-3. OCLC 472256214.
- Sakaoğlu, Necdet (2008). Bu mülkün kadın sultanları: Vâlide sultanlar, hâtunlar, hasekiler, kadınefendiler, sultanefendiler. Oğlak Yayıncılık. pp. 245–249. ISBN 978-9753296236.
- Sakaoğlu, Necdet (2015). Bu Mülkün Sultanları. Alfa Yayıncılık. ISBN 978-6-051-71080-8.
- Süreyya, Mehmet Bey (1996). Sicill-i Osmani. Vol. 1. Is.: Tarih Vakfi Yurt Yayınlar. ISBN 975-333-038-3.
- Thys-Şenocak, Lucienne (2006). Ottoman Women Builders: The Architectural Patronage of Hadice Turhan Sultan. Ashgate. ISBN 978-0-754-63310-5.
- Uluçay, Mustafa Çağatay (2011). Padişahların kadınları ve kızları. Ankara: Ötüken. ISBN 978-9-754-37840-5.
