= Süleymaniye Mosque =

Mosque and religious complex in Istanbul, Turkey

- Süleymaniye Camii
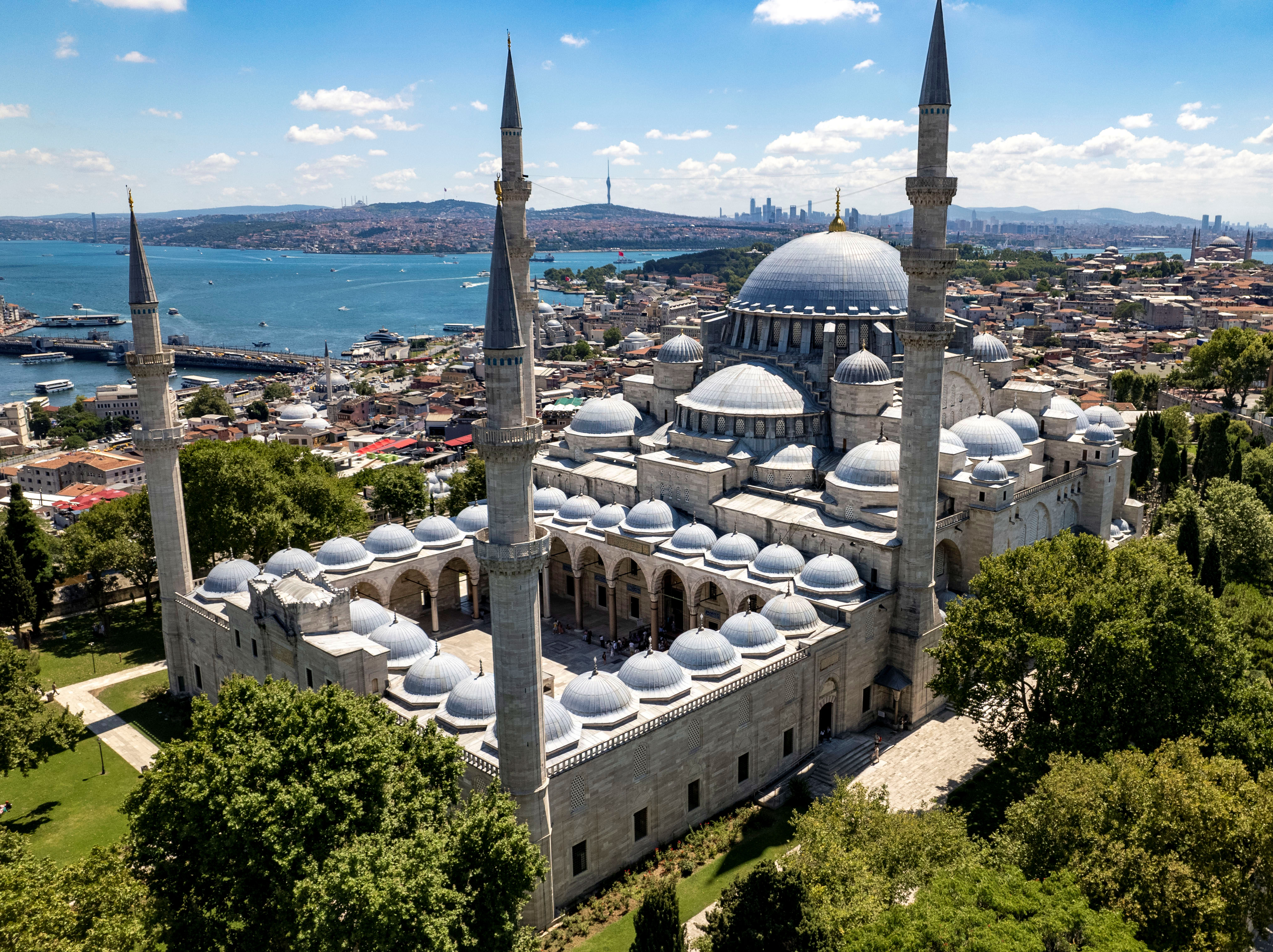

- Location in the Fatih district of Istanbul

Religion
- Affiliation: Islam

Location
- Location: Istanbul, Turkey
- Coordinates: 41°00′58″N 28°57′50″E

Architecture
- Architect: Mimar Sinan
- Type: Mosque
- Style: Ottoman architecture (Classical)
- Groundbreaking: 1550
- Completed: 1557

Specifications
- Height (max): 53 m (174 ft)
- Dome dia. (inner): 26 m (85 ft)
- Minaret: 4
- Minaret height: 76 m (249 ft)

UNESCO World Heritage Site
- Part of: Historic Areas of Istanbul
- Criteria: Cultural: i, ii, iii, iv
- Reference: 356
- Inscription: 1985 (9th Session)

The Süleymaniye Mosque (Turkish: Süleymaniye Camii, pronounced [sylejˈmaːnije]) is an Ottoman imperial mosque located on the Third Hill of Istanbul, Turkey. The mosque was commissioned by Suleiman the Magnificent (r. 1520–1566) and designed by the imperial architect Mimar Sinan. An inscription specifies the foundation date as 1550 and the inauguration date as 1557, although work on the complex probably continued for a few years after this.

The Süleymaniye Mosque is one of the best-known sights of Istanbul, and from its location on the Third Hill, it commands an extensive view of the city around the Golden Horn. It is considered a masterpiece of Ottoman architecture and one of Mimar Sinan's greatest works. It is the largest Ottoman-era mosque in the city.

Like other Ottoman imperial foundations, the mosque is part of a larger külliye (religious and charitable complex) which included madrasas, a public kitchen, and a hospital, among others. Behind the qibla wall of the mosque is an enclosed cemetery containing the separate octagonal mausoleums of Suleiman the Magnificent and his wife Hurrem Sultan (Roxelana).

The Süleymaniye Mosque and its Associated Conservation Area is one of the four components of the UNESCO World Heritage Site "Historic Areas of Istanbul", protected under cultural criteria (i), (ii), (iii), and (iv). Located within the Historic Peninsula, the site falls under multiple conservation designations: it was nationally registered in 1981 as an urban and historic conservation area and again in 1995 as an Archaeological, Urban Archaeological, Historical and Urban Site. The area contains 920 registered properties, including monumental and civil architecture.

== History ==
=== Context ===
Sultan Suleiman the Magnificent chose the architect Mimar Sinan to create a mosque in memory of his son Şehzade (Crown Prince) Mehmed. Suleiman was so impressed with the ensuing Şehzade Mosque that he asked Sinan to design a mosque for himself too. This mosque would represent the pre-eminence of the Ottoman Empire.

In the era of the mosque's construction, Suleiman controlled a huge empire that, after his father Selim's conquest of the Mamluk Sultanate in 1517, covered much of the Islamic world, encouraging him to define his role as an Islamic ruler. During this time, he was also engaged in confrontation with the Safavids, a Shi'a dynasty in Iran, and successfully forced them to make symbolic political concessions in the Treaty of Amasya in 1555. In this context, Suleiman promoted the Ottoman state's reliance on the Shari'a (Islamic law), the ulama (Islamic legal scholars), and orthodox Sunni ideology as a pillar of the sultan's authority and legitimacy. This is reflected in the function and organization of the madrasas and other educational facilities that were built as part of the new mosque's complex (külliye). The latter were given a much larger staff than previous madrasas and the endowment deed (waqf) for the mosque complex designated various religious officials that were to be closely associated with the Ottoman state. More generally, the monumental mosque and its extensive facilities formed a political display of the sultan's power. Among other functions, it served as an impressive setting for the sultan's public appearances at Friday prayers.

Suleiman's intention was to build a mosque that would surpass all others built by his predecessors. Suleiman appears to have represented himself at times as a "second Solomon" and his construction projects in both Jerusalem and Constantinople (Istanbul) appear to reflect this. Architecturally, Suleiman's mausoleum (built behind the mosque) references the Dome of the Rock, which was built on the site of the Temple of Solomon in Jerusalem. According to popular tradition, Justinian I boasted upon the completion of the Hagia Sophia in Constantinople: "Solomon, I have surpassed thee!" Suleiman's mosque, in turn, references the Hagia Sophia, Justinian's creation, in its design and layout. The mosque recalls the Hagia Sophia and the Bayezid II Mosque in its basic form, but as Sinan had already moved beyond this design with the Şehzade Mosque and he rarely revisited old designs during his career, it is likely that this design choice was requested by the sultan himself. The Hagia Sophia, which was converted into a mosque during the Ottoman conquest of the city in 1453, had remained an idealized symbol of sovereignty in Ottoman culture and this probably motivated Suleiman to emulate or surpass it with his own mosque.

=== Construction ===
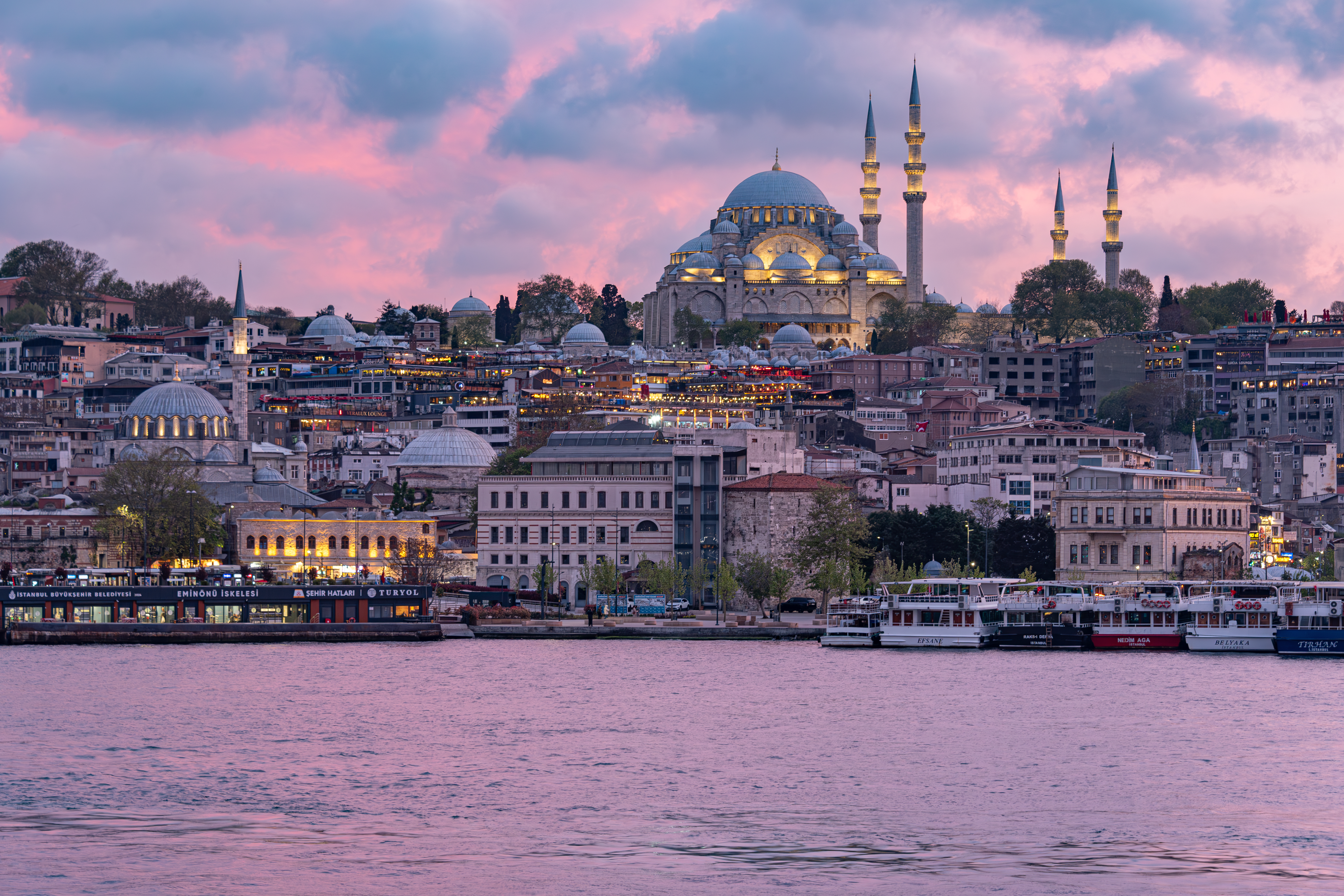
View of the mosque on the skyline of historic Istanbul

The mosque was built on the site of the old Ottoman palace (Eski Saray) which was still in use at the time and had to be demolished. The Arabic inscription above the entrance to the prayer hall gives a foundation date of 1550 and an inauguration date of 1557. In reality, the planning of the mosque began before 1550 and parts of the complex were not completed until after 1557. The final construction expenses were recorded in 1559, relating to some of the madrasas and to the mausoleum of Suleiman's wife, Hürrem Sultan (d. 1558). The mausoleum for Suleiman himself was built after his death on the orders of his son and successor, Selim II, between 1566 and 1568.

Marble spolia from various sites in Constantinople and other parts of the empire were reportedly gathered and shipped to the construction site. Petrus Gyllius, a contemporary observer, wrote about seeing one of the four enormous porphyry columns destined for the mosque's interior being cut down to size and about marble columns being taken from the Hippodrome.

=== Damages and restorations ===
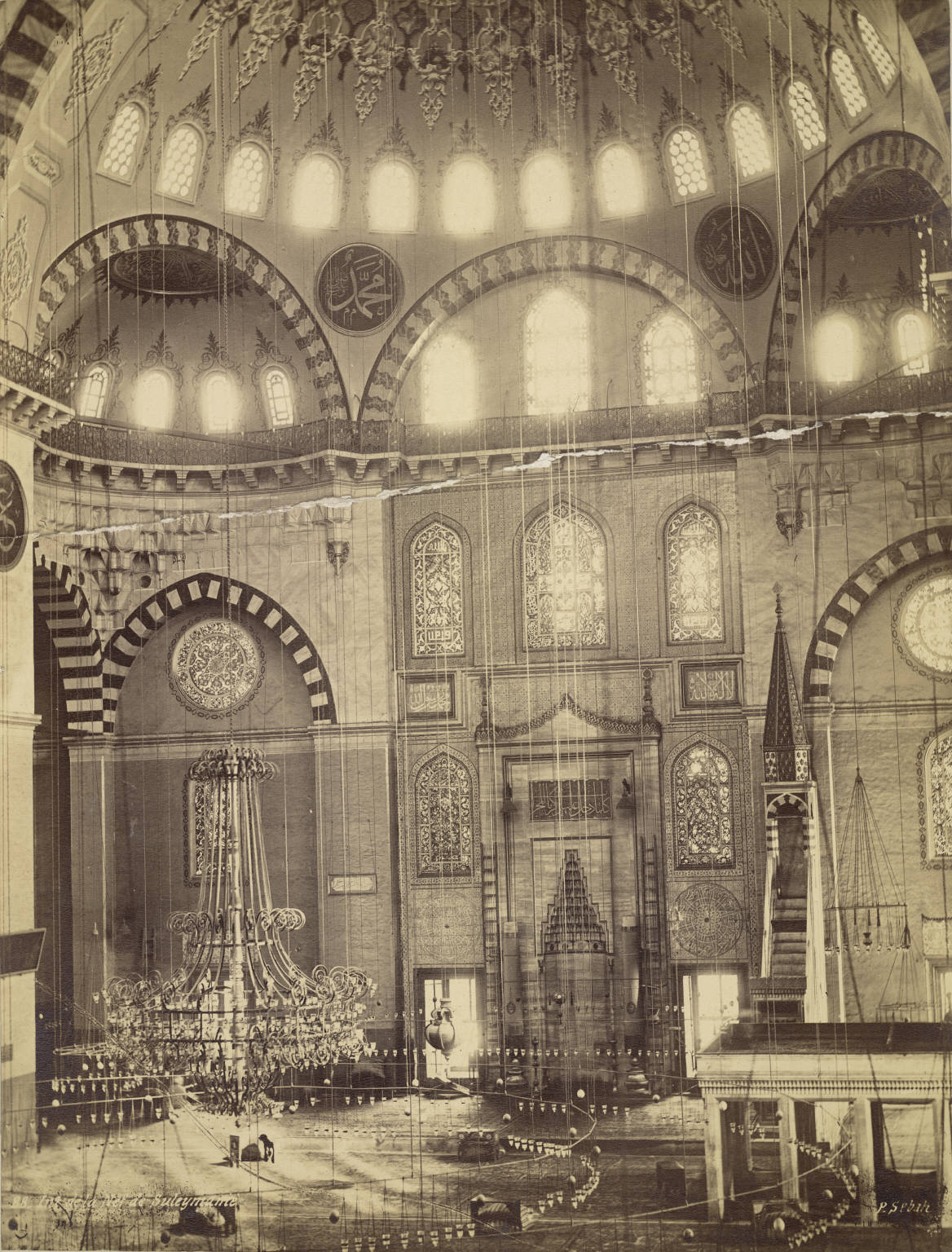
Interior of the mosque in a 19th-century photograph

The Süleymaniye was damaged in the great fire of 1660 and was restored by Sultan Mehmed IV. Part of the dome collapsed during the earthquake of 1766. Repairs damaged what was left of Sinan's original decoration (recent cleaning has shown that he experimented with blue, before making red the dominant colour of the dome).

In 1858 and 1859, extensive repairs were made in the interior of the mosque, the minarets, the outer courtyard, and the tombs. New spaces such as the muvakkithane in the courtyard of the mosque and the custodian's room in the tomb of Sultan Suleiman were built.

During World War I the courtyard was used as a weapons depot, and when some of the ammunition ignited, the mosque suffered another fire. Not until 1956 was it fully restored. Between 1961 and 1967, a restoration of the mosque's prayer hall took place. 19th-century wall decorations were removed and earlier designs beneath the plaster were revealed. These original decorations were identified, partially uncovered, and revived, restoring some of the mosque’s 16th-century character, except for the central dome.

Over time, the mosque has faced various structural and material deteriorations, including erosion of stone surfaces, damage to minarets, corrosion of metal elements, and biological decay in wooden components. Notable issues included black crusts on facades, cracks in minarets, missing or deformed architectural details, and the use of inappropriate materials like cement-based mortars during earlier restorations. The use of cement and gypsum-based mortars as plaster materials in the repairs carried out between 1955 and the 2000s damaged the original structure. In some of these repairs, the original decorations were partially or completely destroyed and sometimes they were left under new layers of plaster and painted over. New decorations imitating the old ones or made in accordance with the taste of the period caused the original atmosphere of the structure to change.

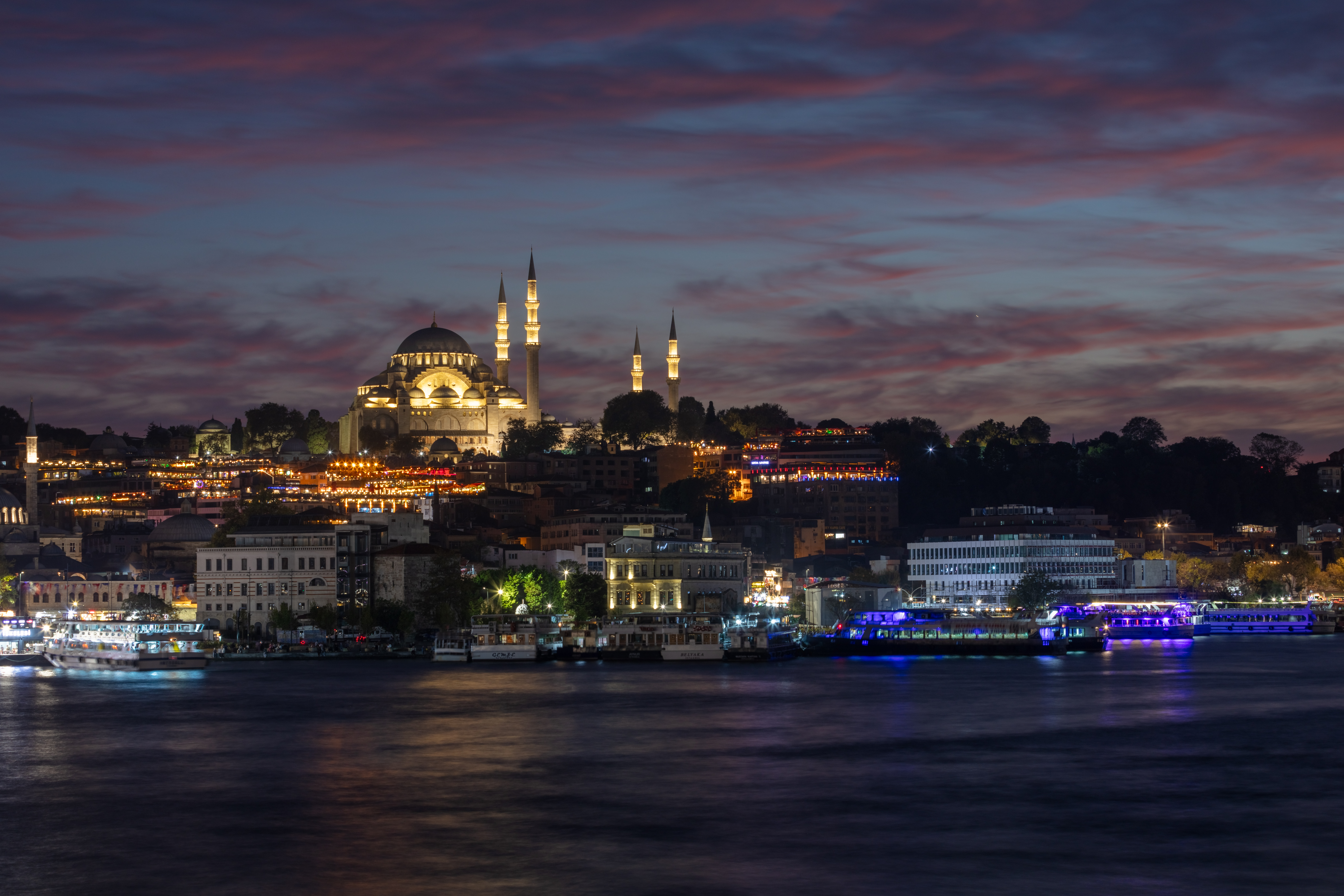
Night view

The mosque was restored again between 2007 and 2010. This was the most comprehensive restoration work that has been undertaken in modern times. Original mortar, plaster and decorations were strengthened and preserved in-situ, regardless of how damaged they were, and only strengthening and cleaning works were carried out in the areas where original decorations were preserved. Intervention with color was avoided as much as possible. Façades and stone elements were cleaned with dry micro-sandblasting and chemical methods. Cement-based additions were removed and replaced with stone and plaster compatible with the original materials. Corroded clamps and iron elements were substituted with stainless steel. Wooden components were disassembled, fumigated, and repaired, with varnishes removed to restore breathability. Reconstructed parts followed original designs, informed by archival and on-site remains. Minaret roofs were replaced or restored, and missing marble and stone elements were remade. During restoration works, widespread cracks were observed across the surface of the main dome, extending from above the window level and continuing along the tension zone. In addition to regular structural monitoring, stratigraphic scraping conducted for the analysis of original painted decorations revealed further details about the cracks. Following this investigation, intervention zones were identified on site. After documenting the ornamental painting in these areas, careful plaster removal was carried out along the cracks. Based on structural calculations, consolidation was performed both on the interior and exterior surfaces of the main dome using injection-based reinforcement.

== Architecture ==
=== Courtyard ===
Like the other imperial mosques in Istanbul, the entrance to the mosque is preceded by a forecourt with a central fountain. The main front gate, on the northwest side of the mosque, projects outward from and above the walls on either side. The entrance portal consists of a recess covered by a triangular vault sculpted with muqarnas, with slender pilasters on either side. Above the muqarnas canopy is an inscription featuring the Sunni version of the shahada (profession of faith). The windows on either side of the portal mark the presence of interior rooms which housed the muvakkithane (chamber of the timekeeper).

The courtyard, measuring around 47 by 57 metres (154 by 187 feet), is of exceptional grandeur with a colonnaded peristyle supported by tall columns of marble, granite and porphyry. The columns are topped by classic Ottoman "stalactite" capitals (carved with muqarnas). On the southeast side of the courtyard, the portico preceding the prayer hall is higher than those on the other three sides, giving this façade a greater monumentality. The three center arches of the northwest portico, corresponding to the front entrance, are also higher than the other arches around them. According to Godfrey Goodwin, reconciling these elements of different heights along the peristyle was Sinan's main aesthetic difficulty. The facade of the prayer hall is also decorated with rectangular Iznik tile window lunettes. It was the first building in which the Iznik tiles included the brightly coloured tomato-red clay under the glaze.

The mosque is equipped with water taps outside the courtyard, between the side entrances of the prayer hall, which are used for performing ablutions. As a result, the drinking fountain in the center of the courtyard is purely decorative. It is a rectangular marble enclosure with a ceiling. The fountain was designed so that water sprayed from the ceiling into the basin below, an unusual feature noted by some 16th-century writers.

Behind the southeast portico, the main entrance to the prayer hall is set within a recess with a complex muqarnas canopy. This is preceded by a dome with a more distinctive design than the other domes of the peristyle. The entrance portal features a foundation inscription carved onto three rectangular panels (two vertical panels on the side and an horizontal one on top). The text was composed by Ebussuud Efendi and its calligraphy, in thuluth script, was created by Hasan Çelebi, a student of Ahmed Karahisari. It states the sultan's name and titles, his genealogy, and a prayer for the continuation of the Ottoman dynasty. The wooden doors of the entrance are made of carved wood, including walnut, ebony, and olive wood, and they are inlaid with ivory and mother-of-pearl.

The side entrances of the mosque courtyard have inscriptions as well. The western gate to the courtyard has an inscription reading, "Peace be unto thee! Thou art good, so enter ye to dwell therein" (Quran 39:73). The other entrances of the mosque have similar inscriptions which compare its gates with the gates of paradise.

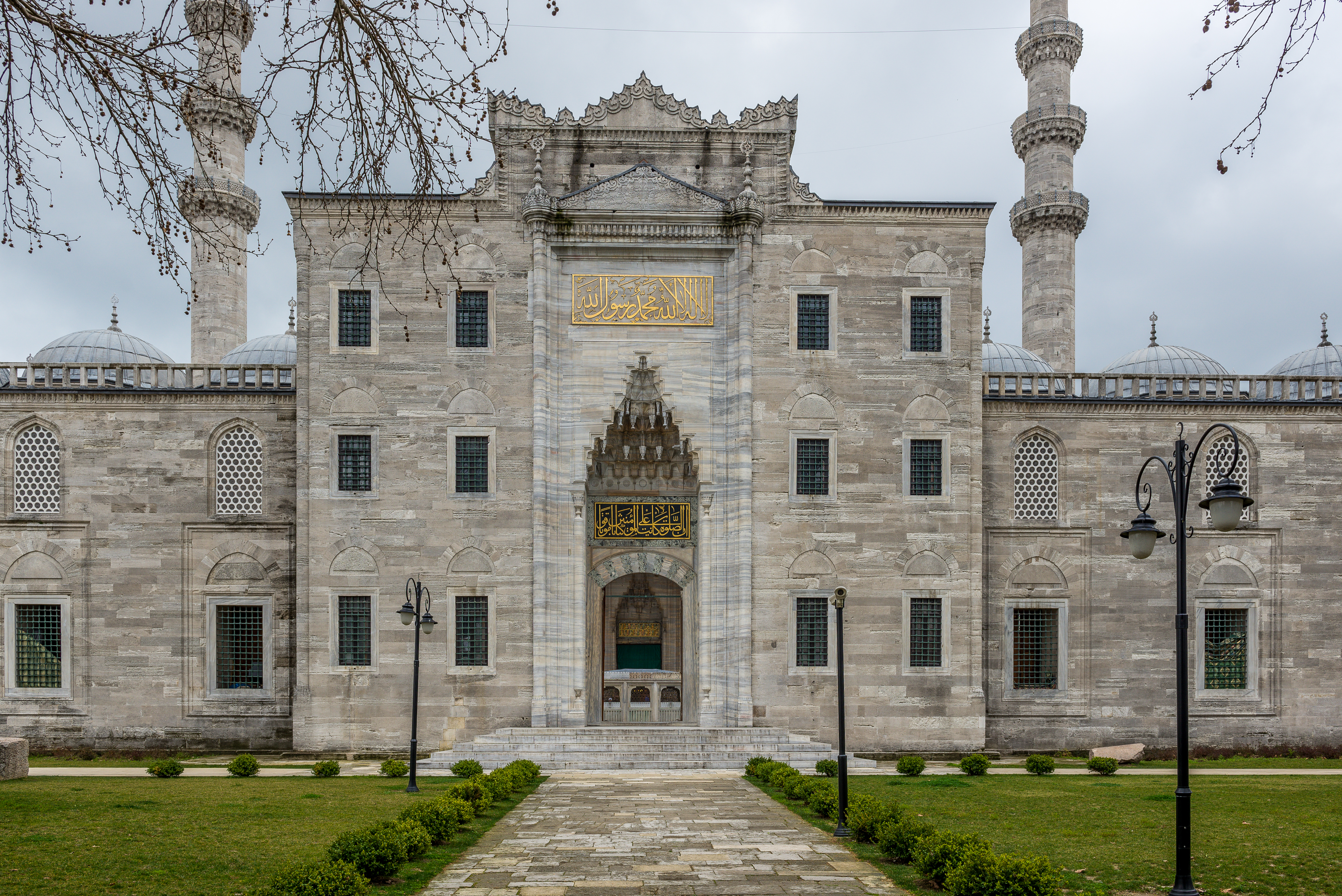
The main entrance to the courtyard (northwest side of the mosque)

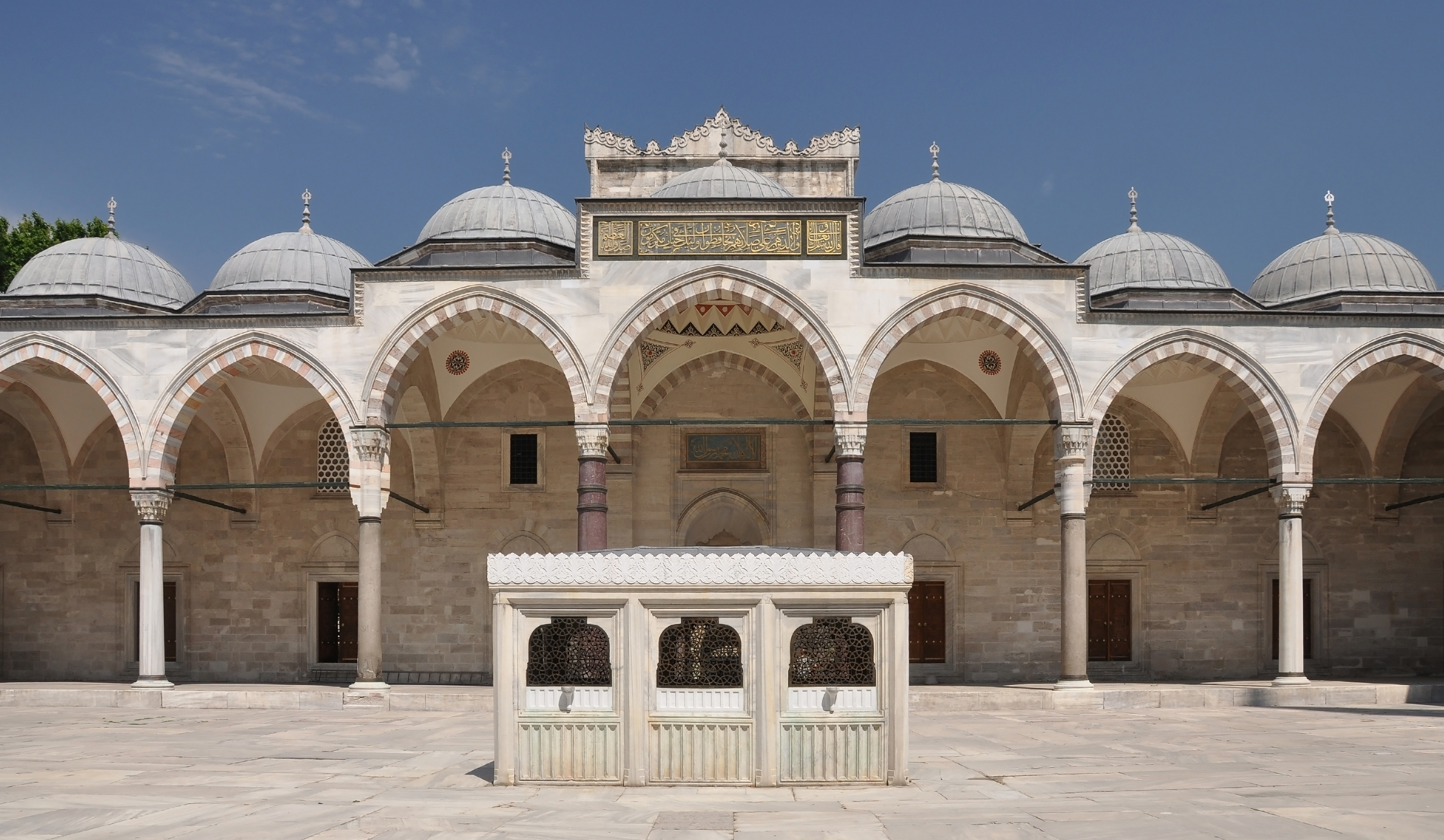
Courtyard of the mosque with central fountain (şadırvan), looking towards the entrance

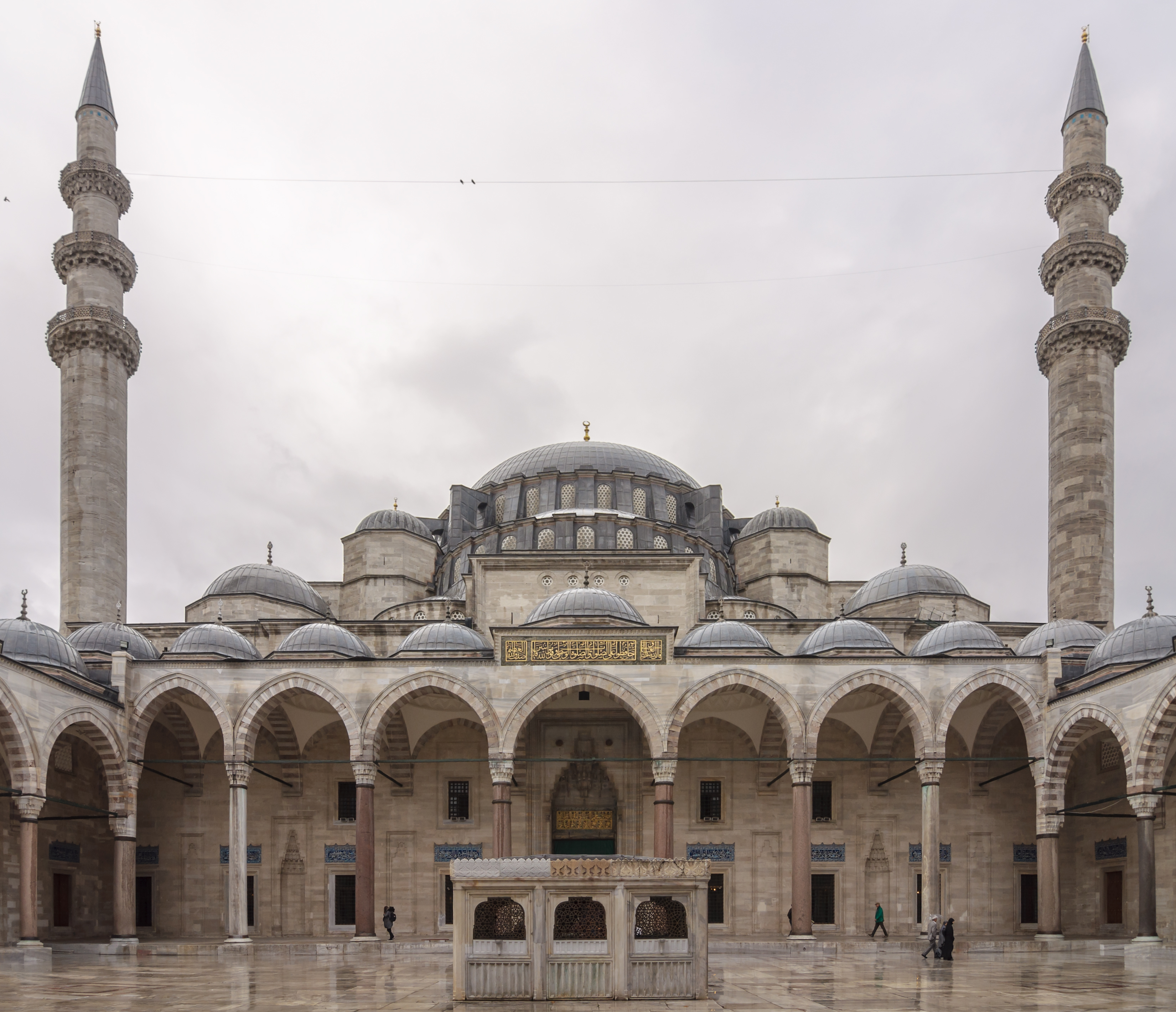
Courtyard of the mosque, looking towards the prayer hall

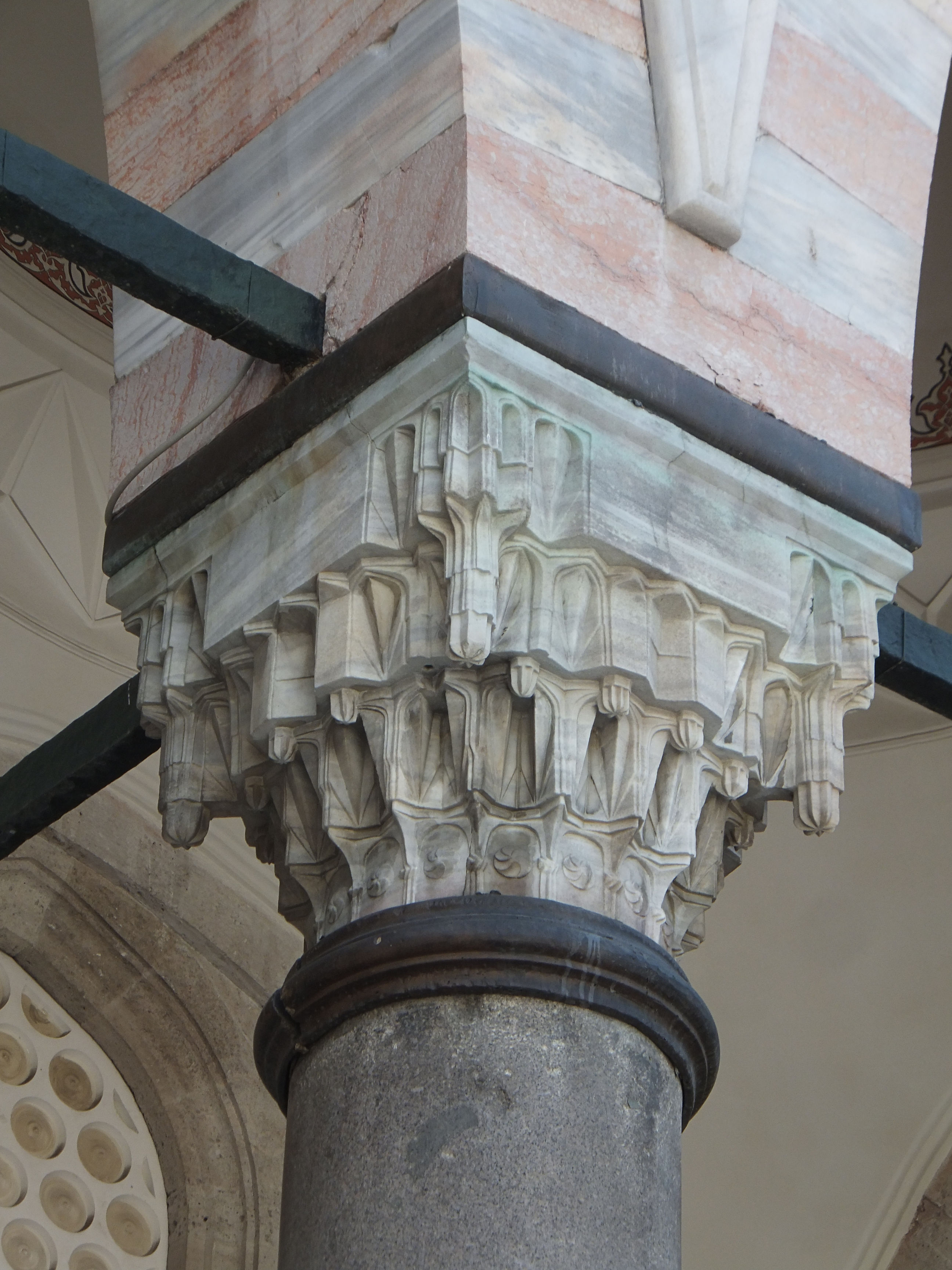
One of the "stalactite" or muqarnas capitals in the courtyard

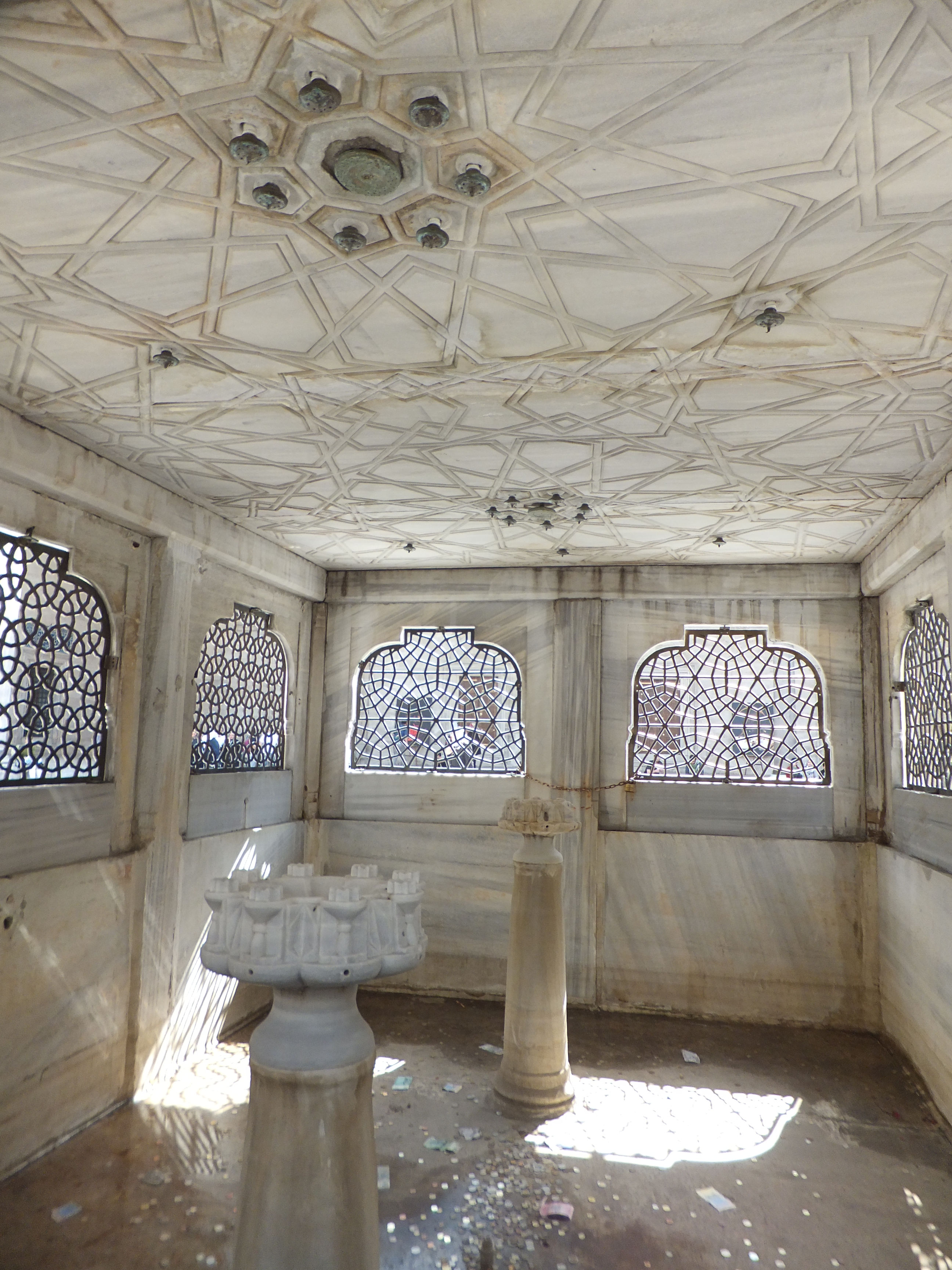
Inside the central fountain of the courtyard, where water originally sprayed down from the ceiling

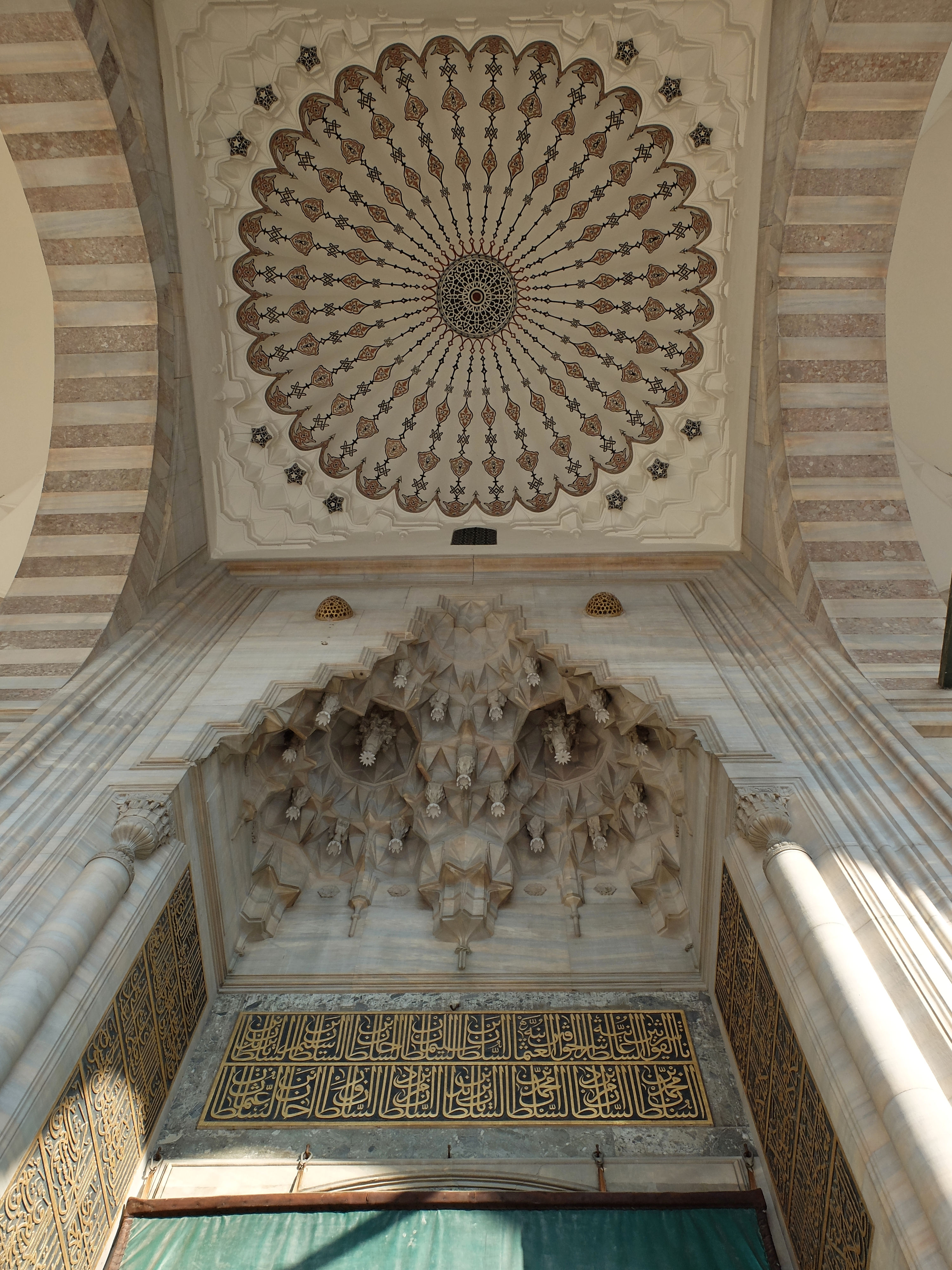
The entrance portal to the prayer hall from the courtyard

=== Minarets ===
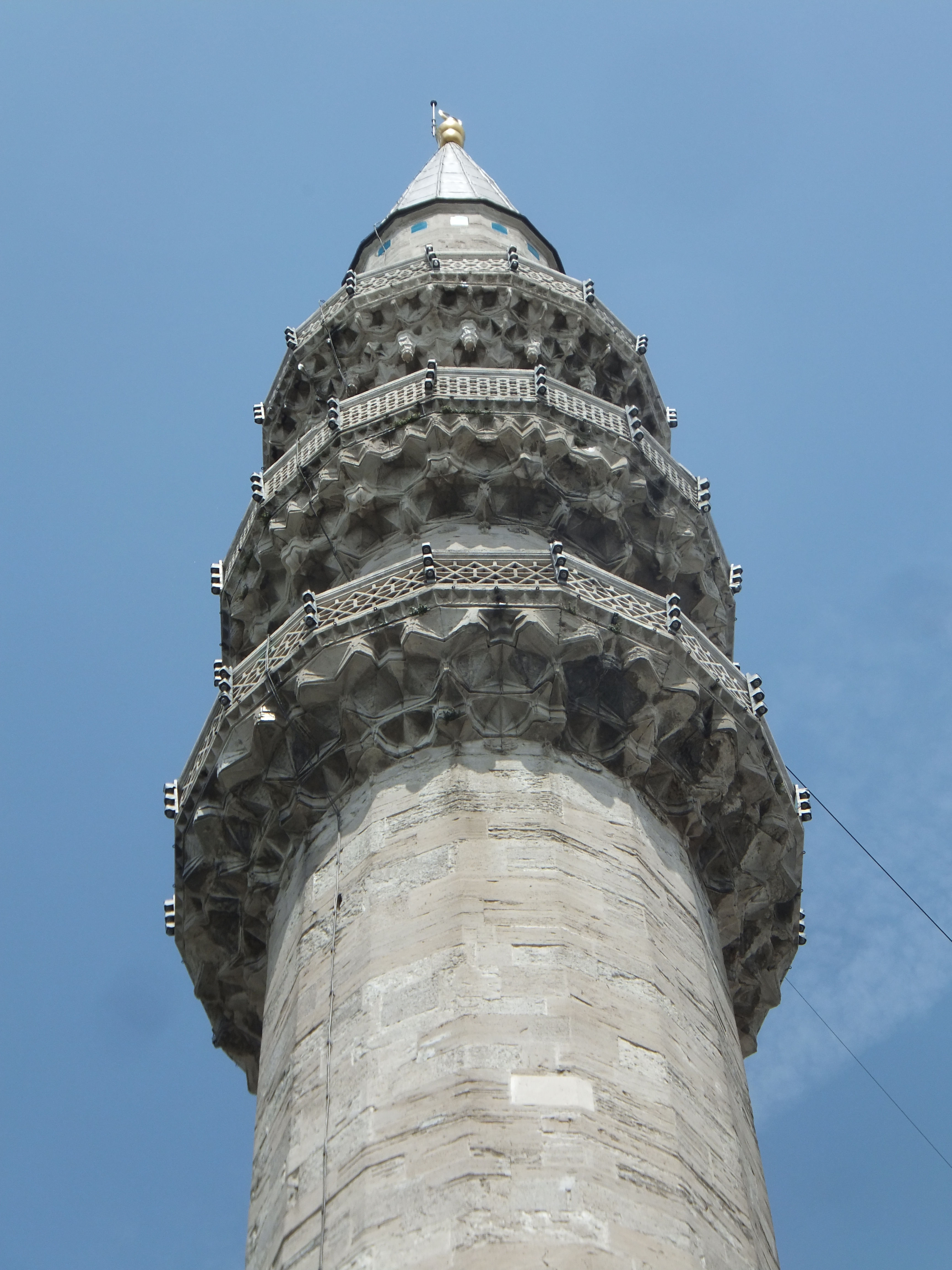
Detail of the minarets and their sculpted balconies

Four minarets occupy the four corners of the courtyard. The two taller ones have three balconies and rise to a height of 63.8 m (209 ft) without their lead caps and 76 m (249 ft) including the caps. The balconies are supported by consoles carved with muqarnas and they have balustrades carved and pierced with geometric patterns.

The use of four minarets at the corners of a mosque courtyard had been done previously at the Üç Şerefeli Mosque in Edirne, although Sinan introduced a strict symmetry not present in the earlier example. In the history of Ottoman architecture, this many minarets were only added to some mosques endowed by a sultan (princes and princesses could construct two minarets; others only one). The minarets have a total of ten balconies, which is said to reflect the fact that Suleiman I was the 10th Ottoman sultan. By making the outer minarets shorter than the inner ones, Sinan also increased the overall visual impression of a structure rising towards the central dome.

=== Prayer hall ===
==== Overall design ====
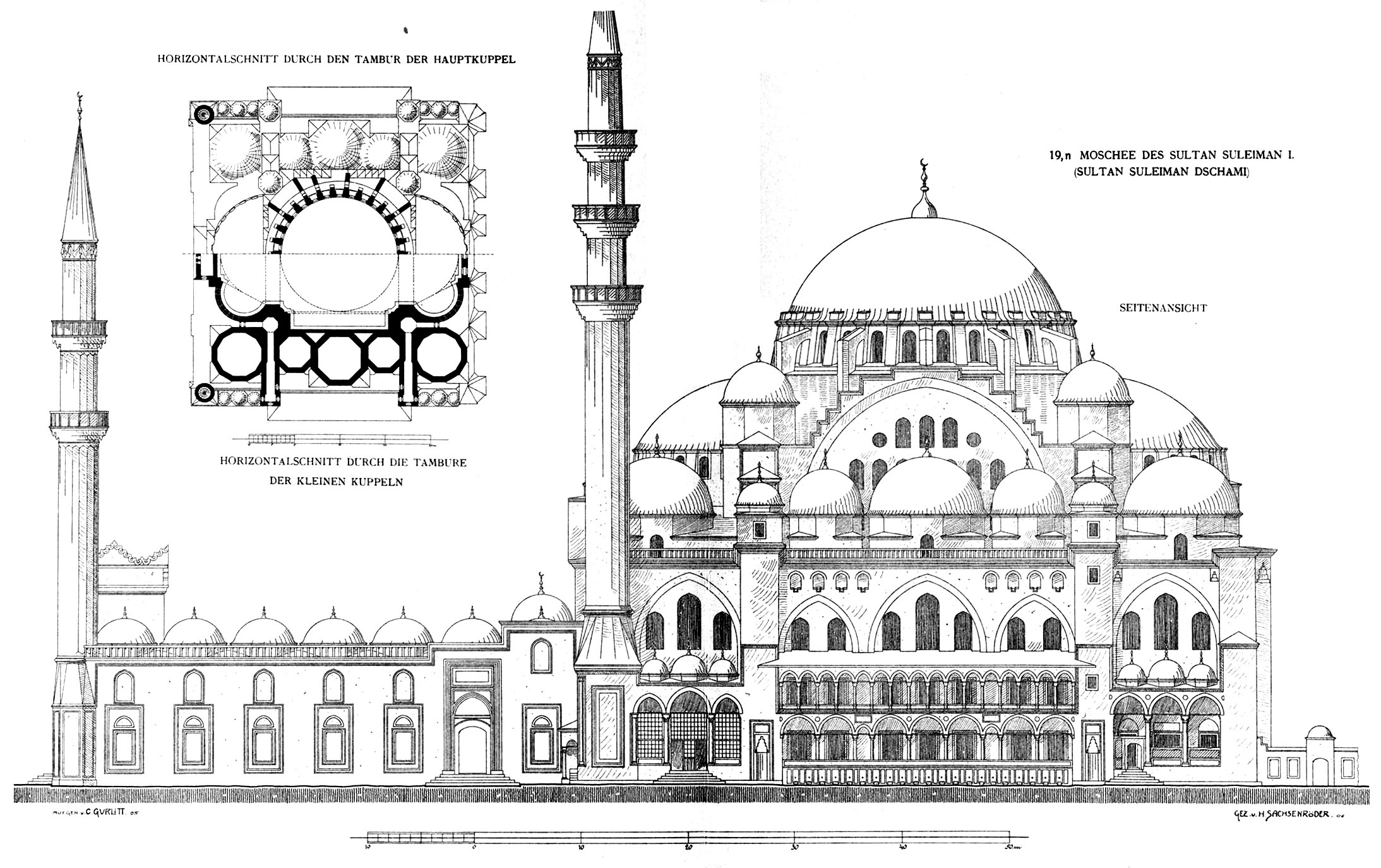
Elevation and plan of the mosque published by Cornelius Gurlitt in 1912

The interior of the mosque is almost a square, measuring 58.5 by 57.5 metres (192 by 189 feet), forming a single vast space dominated by its central dome. The dome is 53 metres (174 feet) high and has a diameter of 26.5 metres (86.9 feet) which is exactly half the height. The square space directly below this dome occupies exactly half the total area of the prayer hall. The layout emulates the dome design of the Hagia Sophia and also follows the layout of the earlier Bayezid II Mosque: the central dome is flanked by semi-domes both in front and behind, covering the main central space, while a row of smaller and lower domes covers each of the two lateral aisles on either side. Between these smaller domes and the main dome are large tympanas filled with windows. This repetition of an older building plan is uncharacteristic of Sinan and may have been the result of Suleiman's personal wishes.

Sinan refined the design by repeating the innovations he had previously used in the Şehzade Mosque. The dome and semi-domes are supported by a limited number of load-bearing pillars and buttresses, allowing for more windows in the walls between them and minimizing any obstructive divisions within the prayer space. He dissimulated many of the load-bearing buttresses by incorporating them into the outer walls, where they project partly inwards and partly outwards so as to make them appear less massive from either side. He built colonnaded galleries between them both on the outside and on the inside, thus further obscuring their presence. Because the supporting buttresses are dissimulated within the walls of the building, they do not dominate and obscure its profile as they do at the Hagia Sophia. Thus, on the outside, the arrangement of arches, turrets, and semi-domes forms a more harmonious, almost pyramid-like progression to the central dome, emphasizing the latter as the visual culmination of the structure. The exception to this is the southeast wall (facing the cemetery), where the buttresses are fully situated on the outside in order to maintain a flat surface for the qibla wall on the inside.

Sinan also introduced greater variety and detail to the mosque's design than in previous works. For example, in the domes covering the lateral aisles, he alternated between domes of different sizes, thus introducing a certain visual rhythm. The spaces in front of the side entrances of the prayer hall, between the pairs of massive buttresses at the corners of the building, are also covered by domes of alternating designs: a circular dome in the middle flanked by two smaller elliptical domes on the side. Moreover, by adding these four side entrances at the corners – instead of two side entrances at the middle of the lateral walls, as was done in the Şehzade Mosque – Sinan found a better use for these corner areas that were typically neglected or omitted in other centrally-planned buildings. On the outside, the two level-galleries have wide projecting eaves which shelter water taps used for ablutions, another innovation.

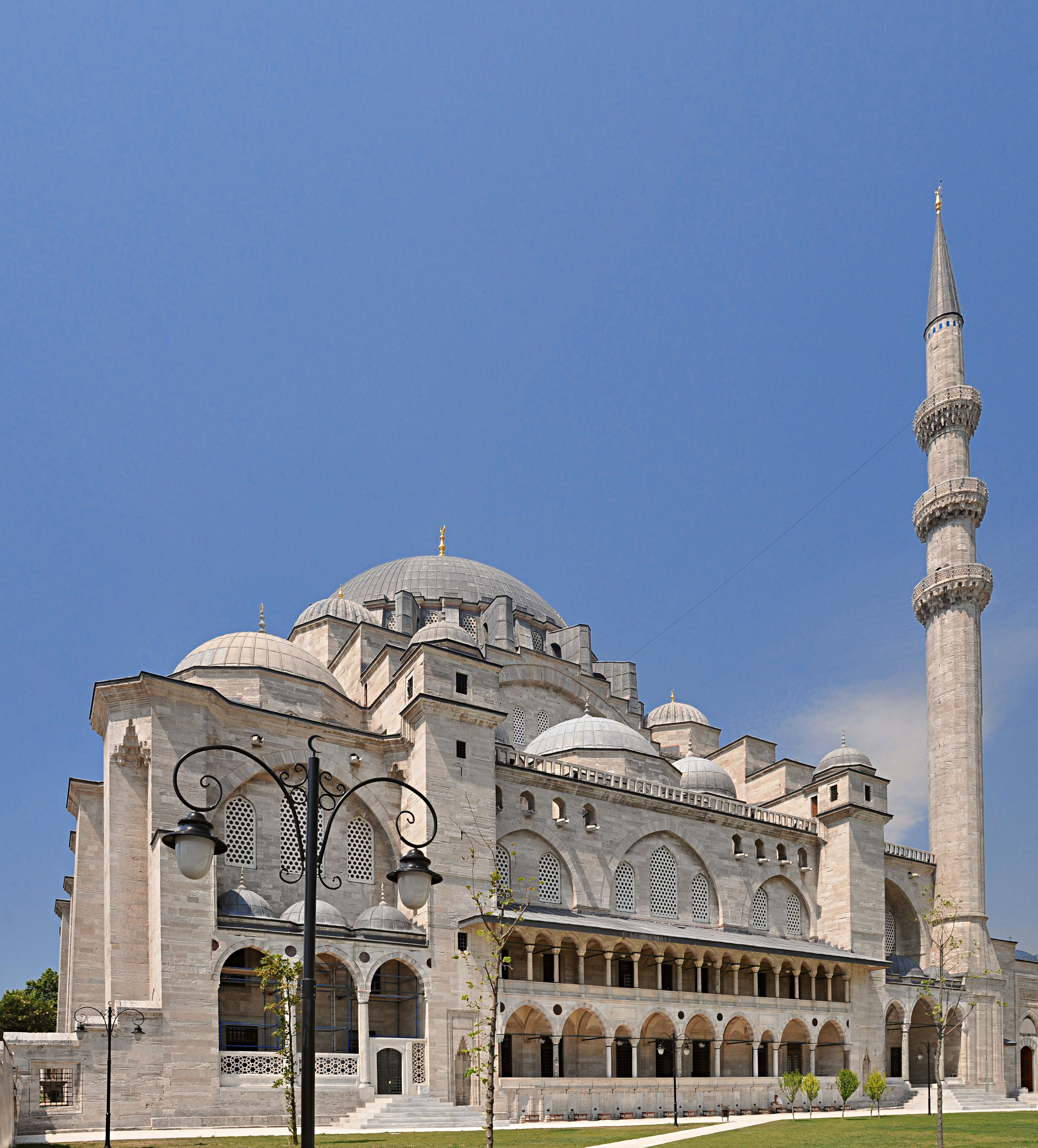
View of the mosque's exterior (northeast side)

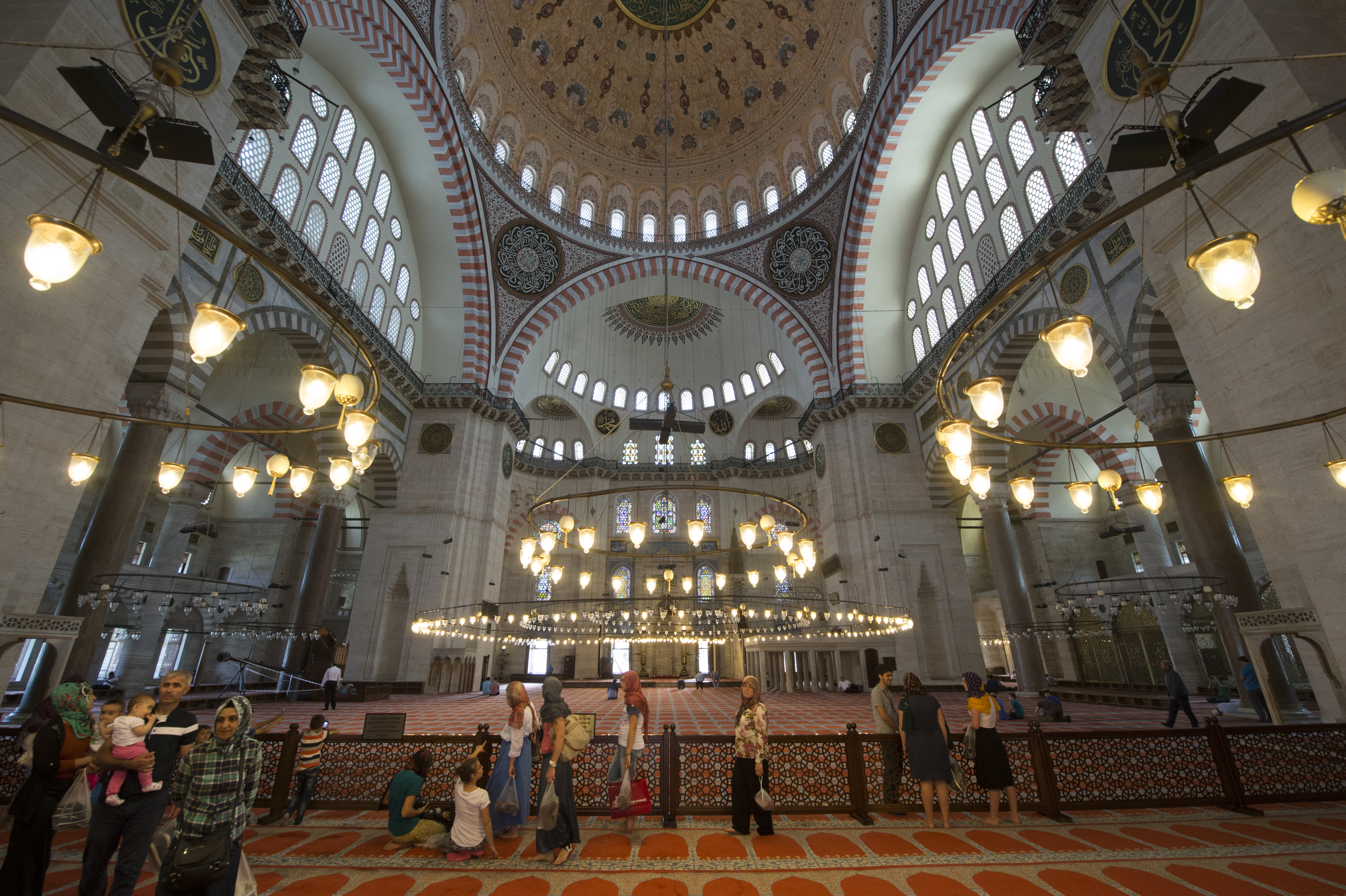
Interior of the prayer hall, looking towards the mihrab

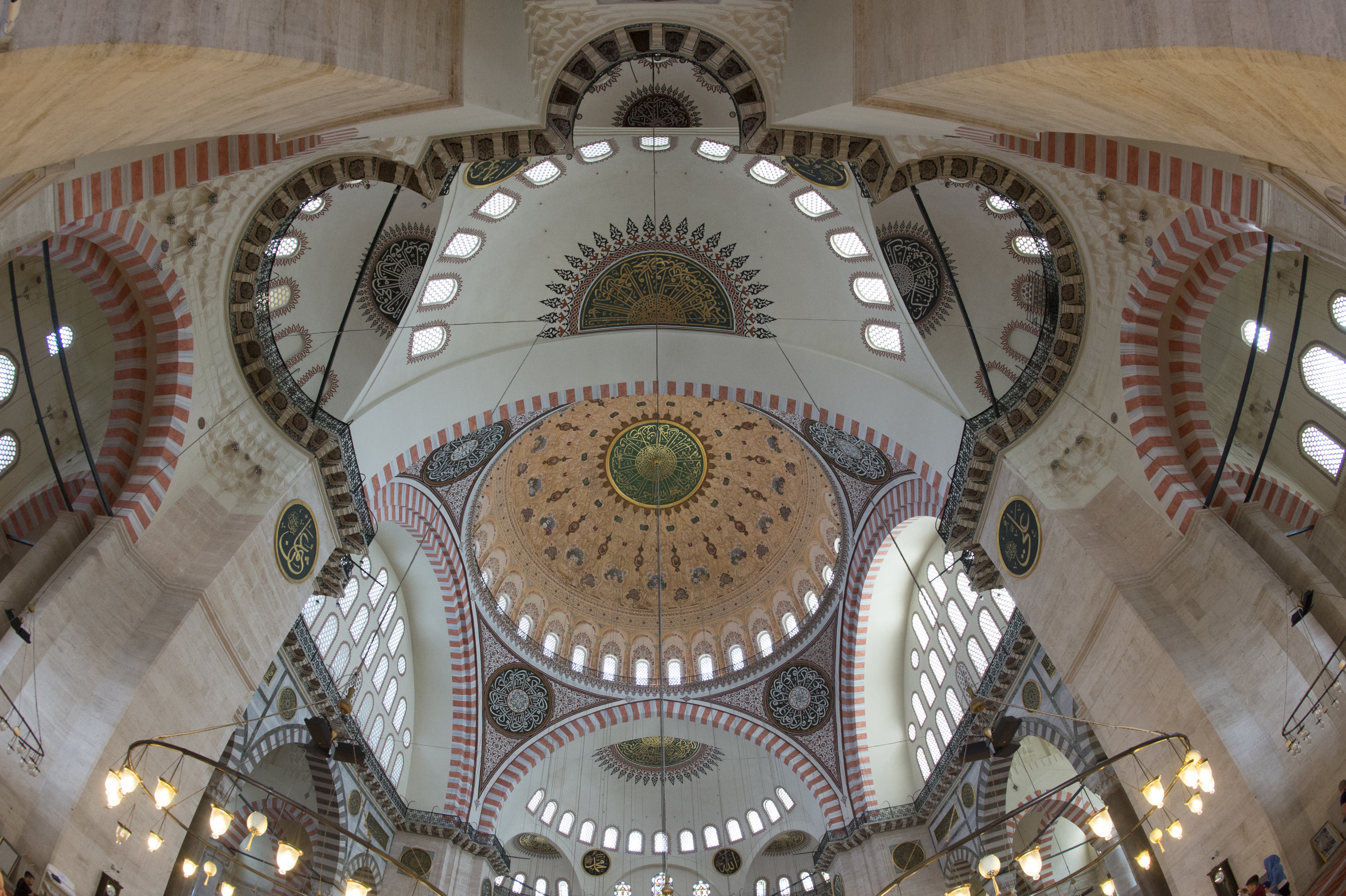
View of the semi-domes around the central dome

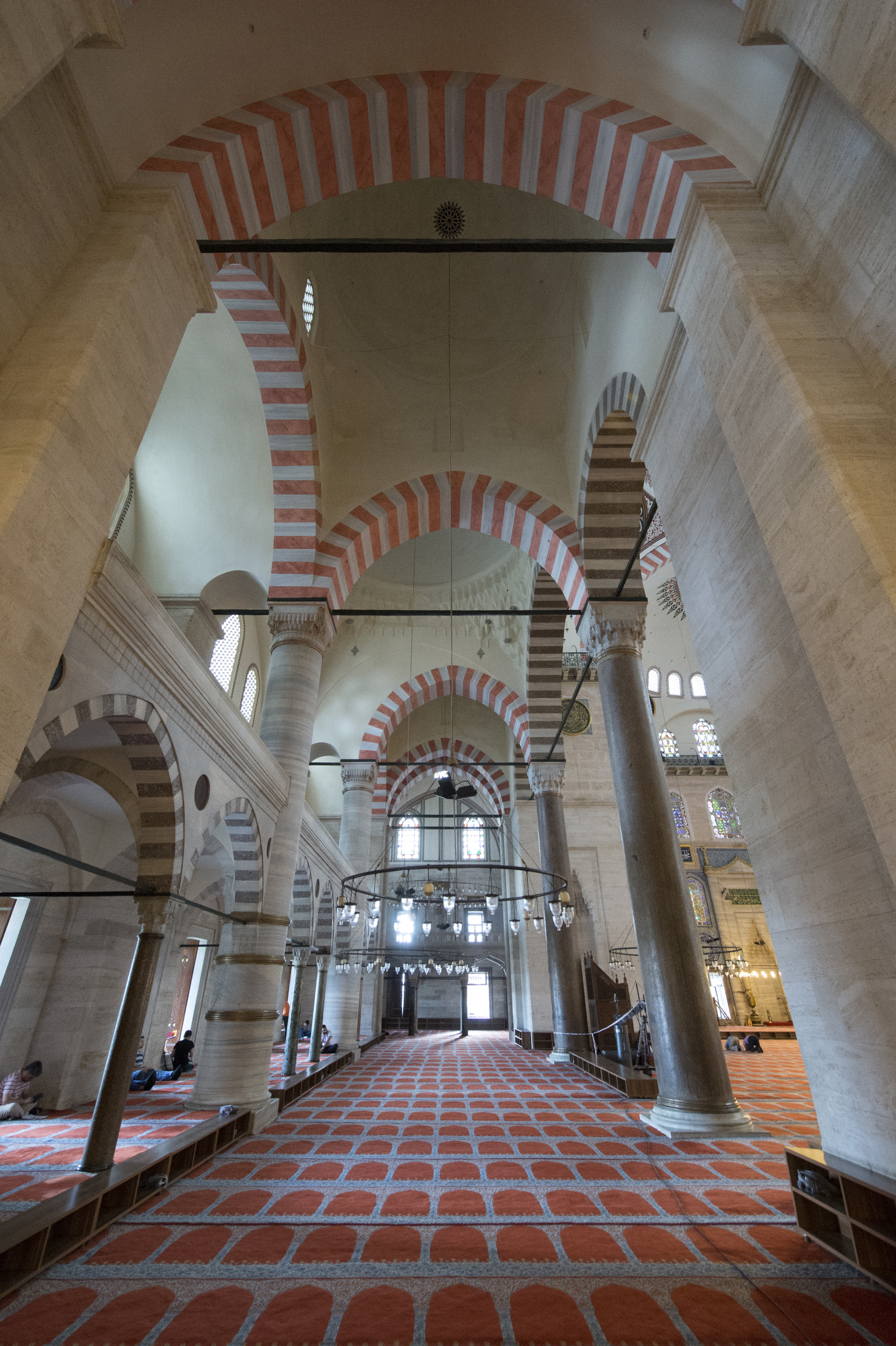
One of the side aisles of the mosque

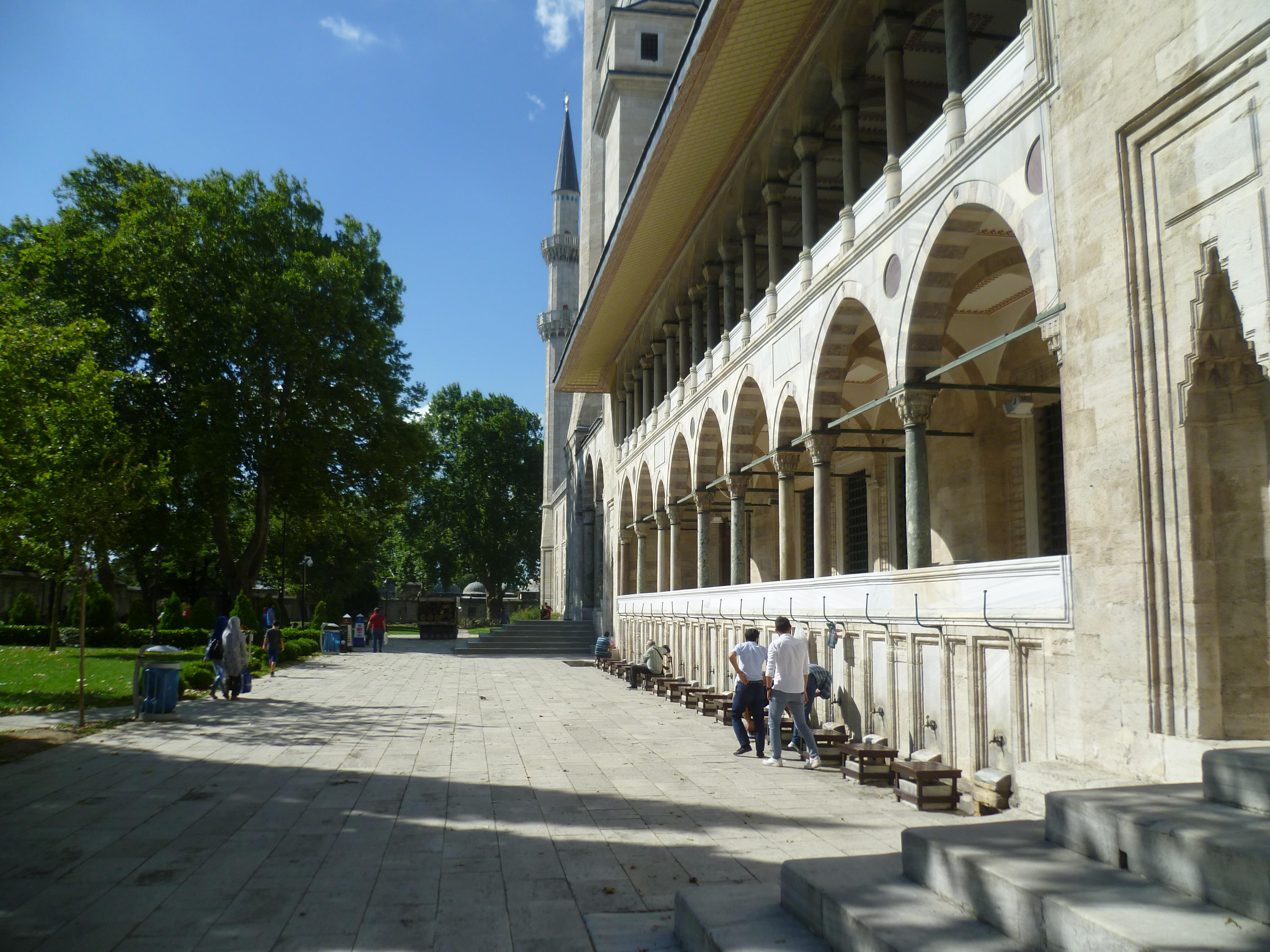
One of the arcaded galleries on the mosque's exterior and the water taps for ablutions

==== Decoration ====
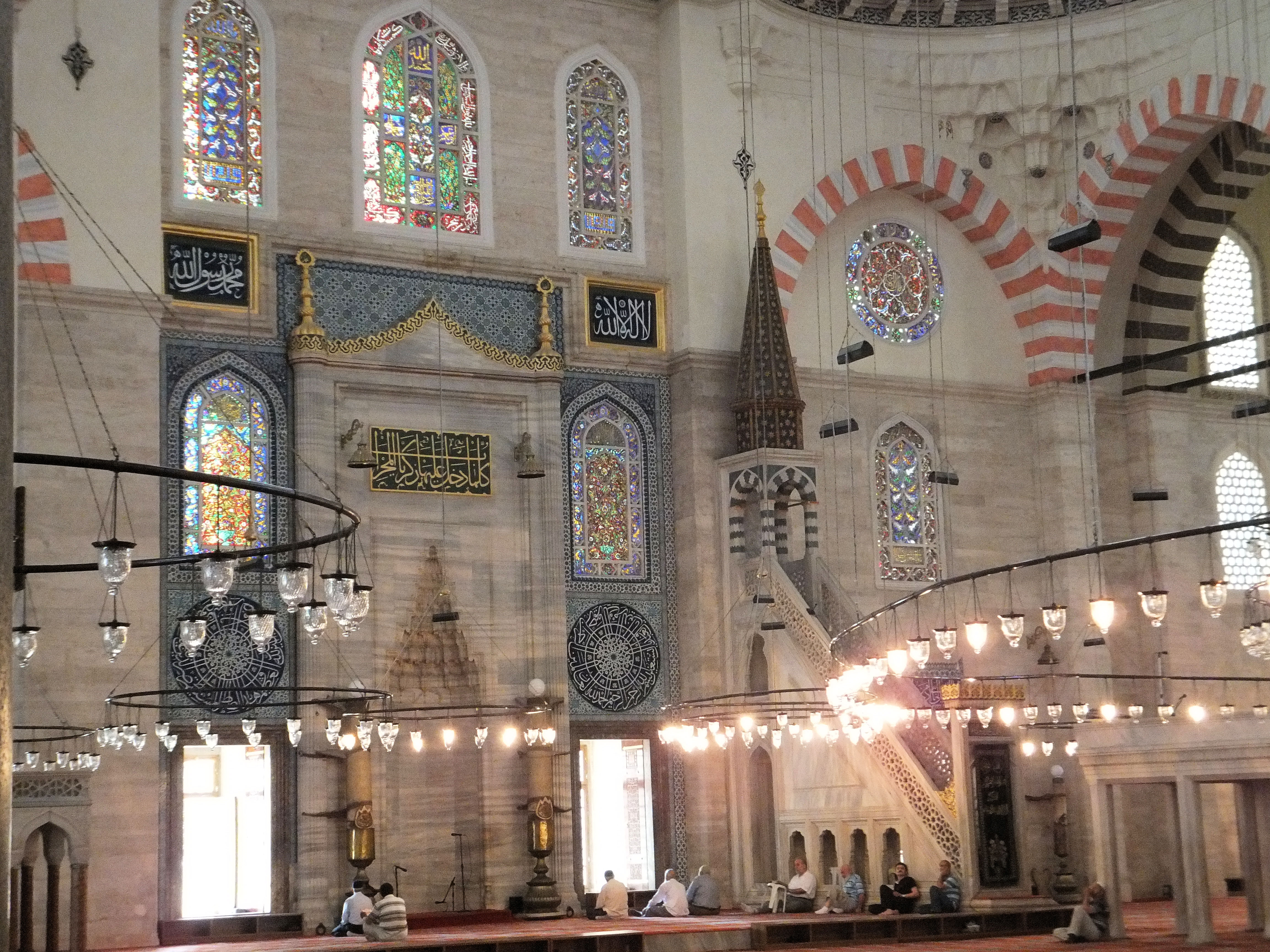
View of the mihrab (niche symbolizing the qibla) and the minbar (pulpit)

The interior decoration is restrained and this seems to have been deliberate on Sinan's part. The documents of the mosque's waqf (religious endowment) explicitly claim that ostentatious ornamentation of gold or jewels was avoided in order to conform with the traditions of the Islamic prophet Muhammad. It is possible that Suleiman and Sinan regarded calligraphy as the primary form of decoration, in the spirit of a period when the Ottoman sultan championed a more austere Sunni orthodoxy. The calligraphy of the mosque is almost entirely in monumental thuluth form and is attributed to Hasan Çelebi, whom Sinan may have favoured.

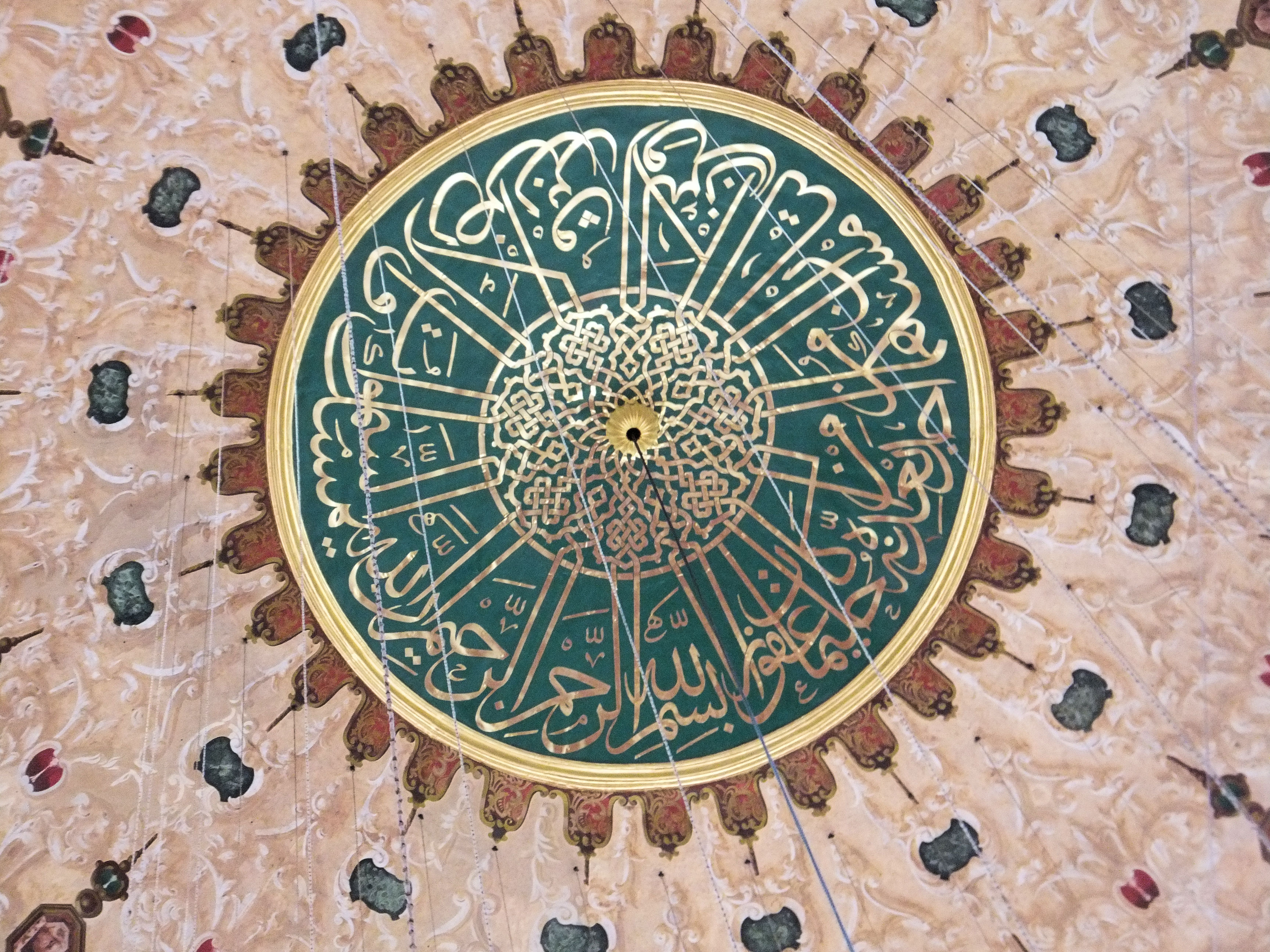
Calligraphic decoration at the apex of the dome, surrounded by later Baroque painted decoration added by the Fossati brothers

Most or all of the mosque's original painted decoration has been destroyed in the course of later damages and repairs. Very little is known directly about the original painted decoration. The present-day painting of the central dome dates from a 19th-century restoration by the Fossati brothers, who chose to roughly imitate Ottoman Baroque decoration. Traces of the original decoration were found during 20th-century cleaning and suggest that blue colours were used before Sinan replaced them with predominantly red colours. The Fossati-era painting has been maintained in more recent restorations as it is now considered part of the mosque's history. Elsewhere, the voussoirs of the mosque's stone arches are painted in red and white to imitate marble. Except for the inscriptions carved in stone, most of the other calligraphy found throughout the mosque is painted and was thus likely restored in later periods. The restorations appear to have been careful and probably retain some aspects of the original compositions.

The stonework of the mosque is of high quality. The columns have classic Ottoman "stalactite" or muqarnas-carved capitals. On both the front and back sides of the four main pillars are tall and sharply-pointed muqarnas niches. Water faucets are also set into the pillars.

The mihrab consists of the traditional niche with a muqarnas hood. This is framed inside a marble surface in the same shape as the central (northwest) gate of the mosque's courtyard (aligned on the same axis as the mihrab). The edges of this simple marble composition are sculpted into fluted columns that terminate at the top with crescent symbols, while an arabesque runs along the top edge in between.

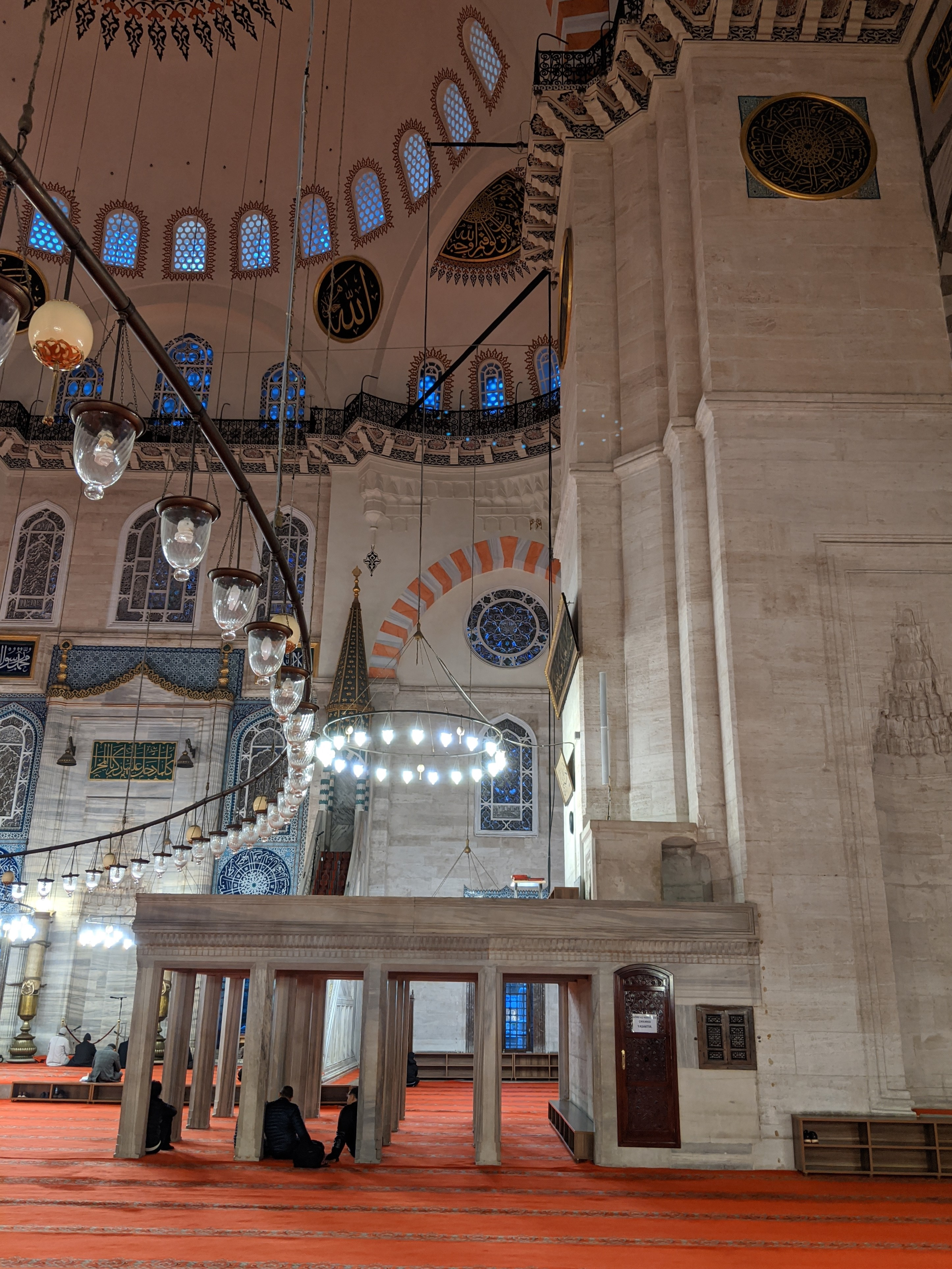
The muezzin mahfili (muezzin's platform)

Next to the mihrab is the minbar, which is crafted in traditional Ottoman form: a narrow staircase, with triangular sides, climbing from a portal to a canopy. The decoration is simplified in comparison with more ornate Ottoman examples, limited to the geometric patterning of the balustrades and the gilded stars on a blue ground covering the conical cap of the canopy. Located nearby are a simple platform or balcony for the sultan (hünkar mahfili) and another platform for the muezzin (muezzin mahfili), all made of marble with only a few discrete embellishments.

Iznik tile revetments are only used around the mihrab. The repeating rectangular tiles have a stencil-like floral pattern on a white ground. The flowers are mainly blue with turquoise, red, and black, but green is not used. On either side of the mihrab are large Iznik-tile calligraphic roundels with text from the Al-Fatiha surah of the Quran 1:1-7.

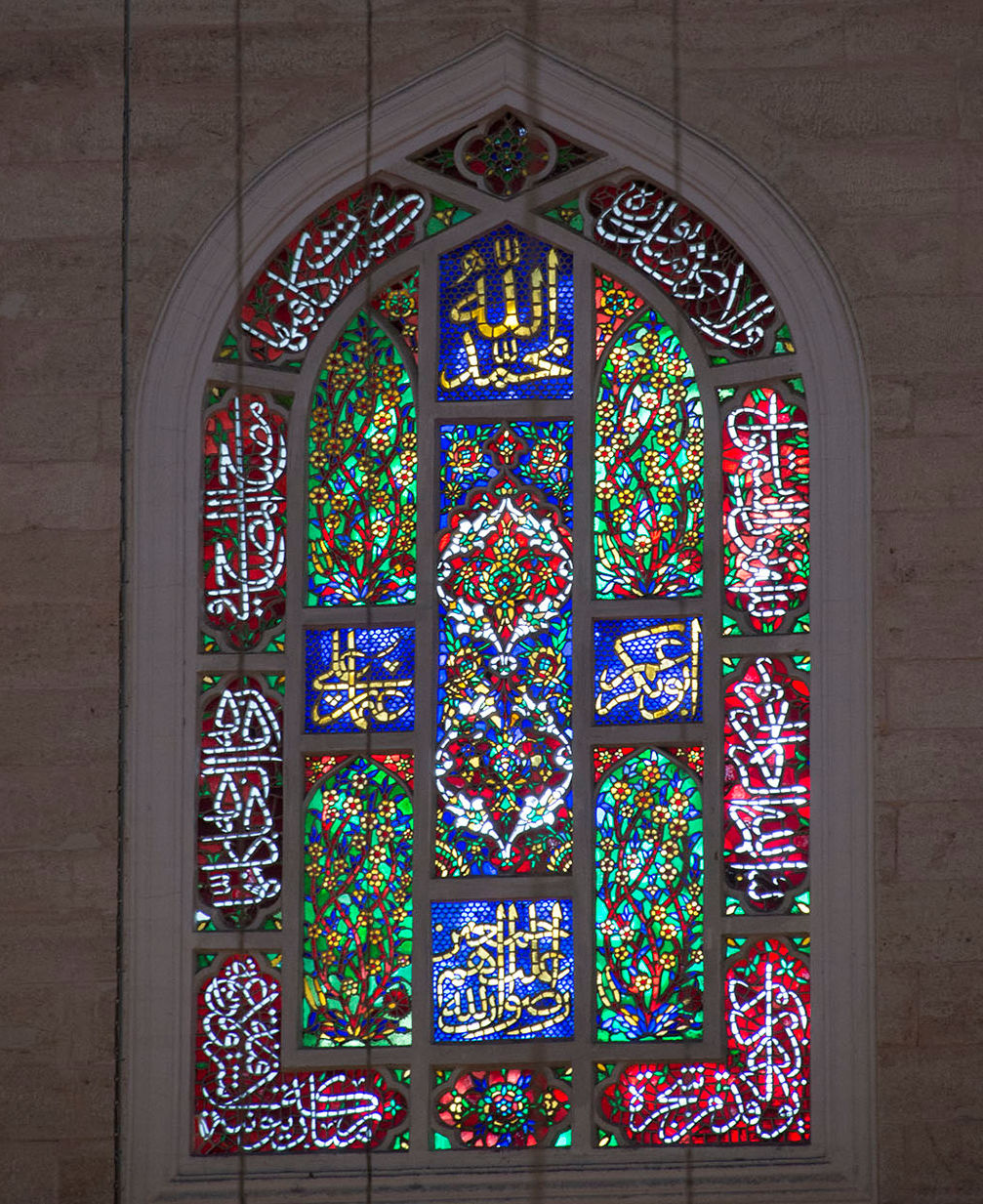
One of the stained-glass windows on the qibla wall

The most elaborate stained-glass windows are found on the qibla wall, near the mihrab. They are generally believed to have been the work of Sarhos Ibrahim, but some of the present-day windows have likely been restored at later periods. They are designed to display the names of God (Allah), the Islamic prophet Muhammad, and the four Rashidun caliphs.

The names of God and Muhammad are repeated in inscriptions above the lower windows, emphasizing God as the source of Islamic law (Shari'a) and Muhammad as the preacher of that law. The names of the four caliphs are also repeated on the mosque's four main pillars, recalling the four pillars of Sunni theology. The selection of these inscriptions, along with others across the mosque, emphasize the orthodox Sunni character of the mosque, reflecting in part the Ottoman rivalry with the contemporary Safavids, the main Shi'a dynasty to the east.

== Complex ==
=== Mausoleums ===
Behind the qibla wall (southeast wall) of the mosque is an enclosed cemetery which contains the separate mausoleums (türbe) of Sultan Suleiman I and his wife Hürrem Sultan (Roxelana).

The large octagonal mausoleum of Suleiman the Magnificent bears the date of 1566, the year of his death, but it was probably not completed until the following year. It is one of the largest Ottoman mausoleums and its design has been compared to the Dome of the Rock in Jerusalem, on which it may have been modeled on the latter. The mausoleum is surrounded by a peristyle (portico) with a projecting roof supported by 24 columns; the entrance faces towards the east rather than the usual north. Beneath the portico on either side of the entrance are Iznik tiled panels. These are the earliest known tiles decorated with the bright emerald green colour that would become a common feature of Iznik ceramics. The dome, 14 meters in diameter, is the first major example of a double-shelled dome in Sinan's architecture. The interior has a false dome supported on eight columns within the outer shell. There are 14 windows at ground level and an additional 24 windows with stained glass set in the tympana under the arches. The walls and pendentives are covered with polychrome Iznik tiles. Above the windows runs a band of inscriptive tiled panels. The text quotes the Throne verse and the following two verses from the Quran 2:255-258. In addition to the tomb of Suleiman the Magnificent, the mausoleum houses the tomb of his daughter Mihrimah Sultan and those of two later sultans: Suleiman II (ruled 1687–1691) and Ahmed II (ruled 1691–1695).

Hurrem Sultan's octagonal mausoleum is dated 1558, the year of her death. The 16-sided interior is decorated with Iznik tiles. The seven rectangular windows are surmounted by tiled lunettes and epigraphic panels. Between the windows are eight mihrab-like hooded niches. The ceiling is now whitewashed but was probably once painted in bright colours.

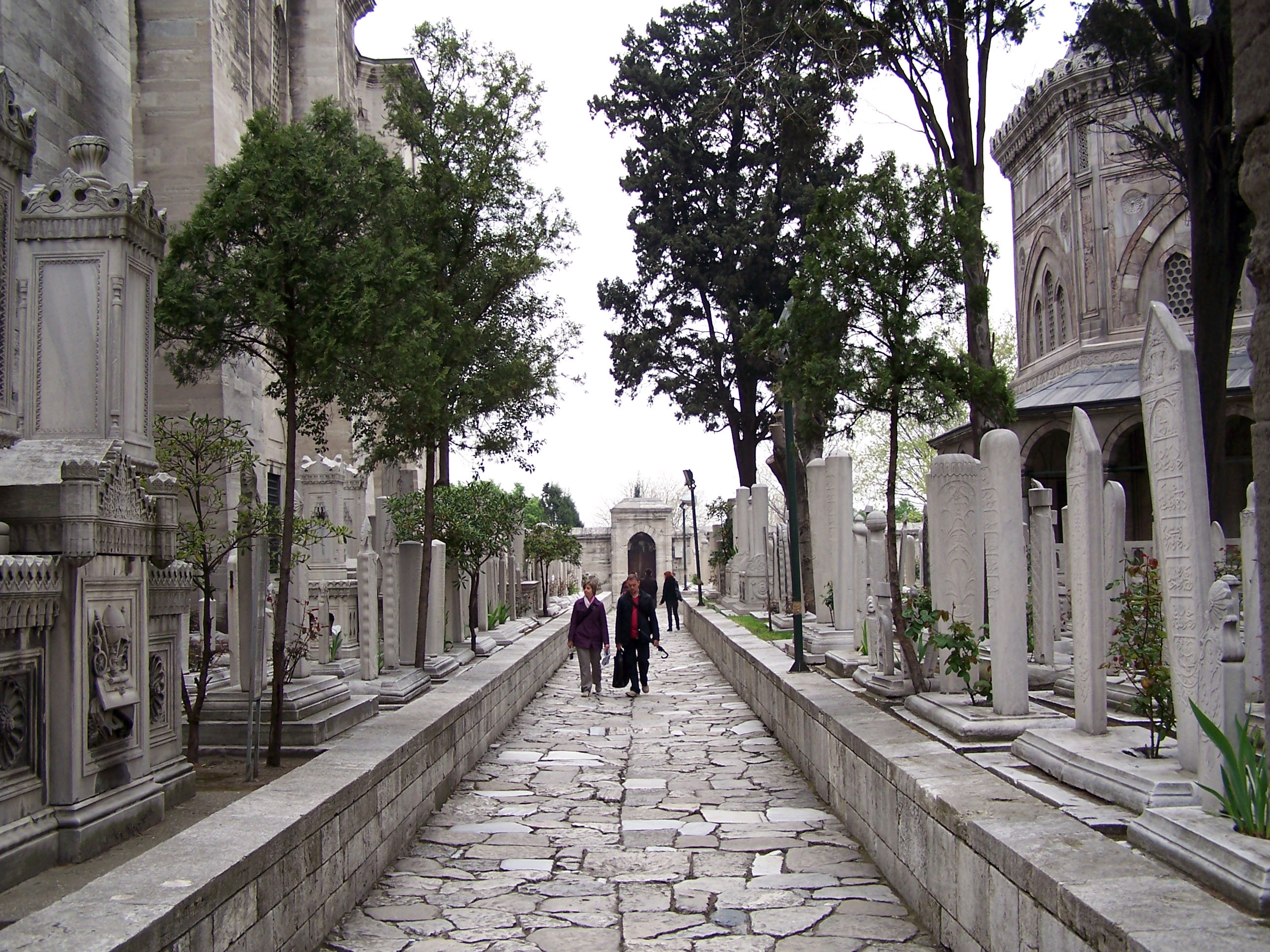
The cemetery behind the mosque

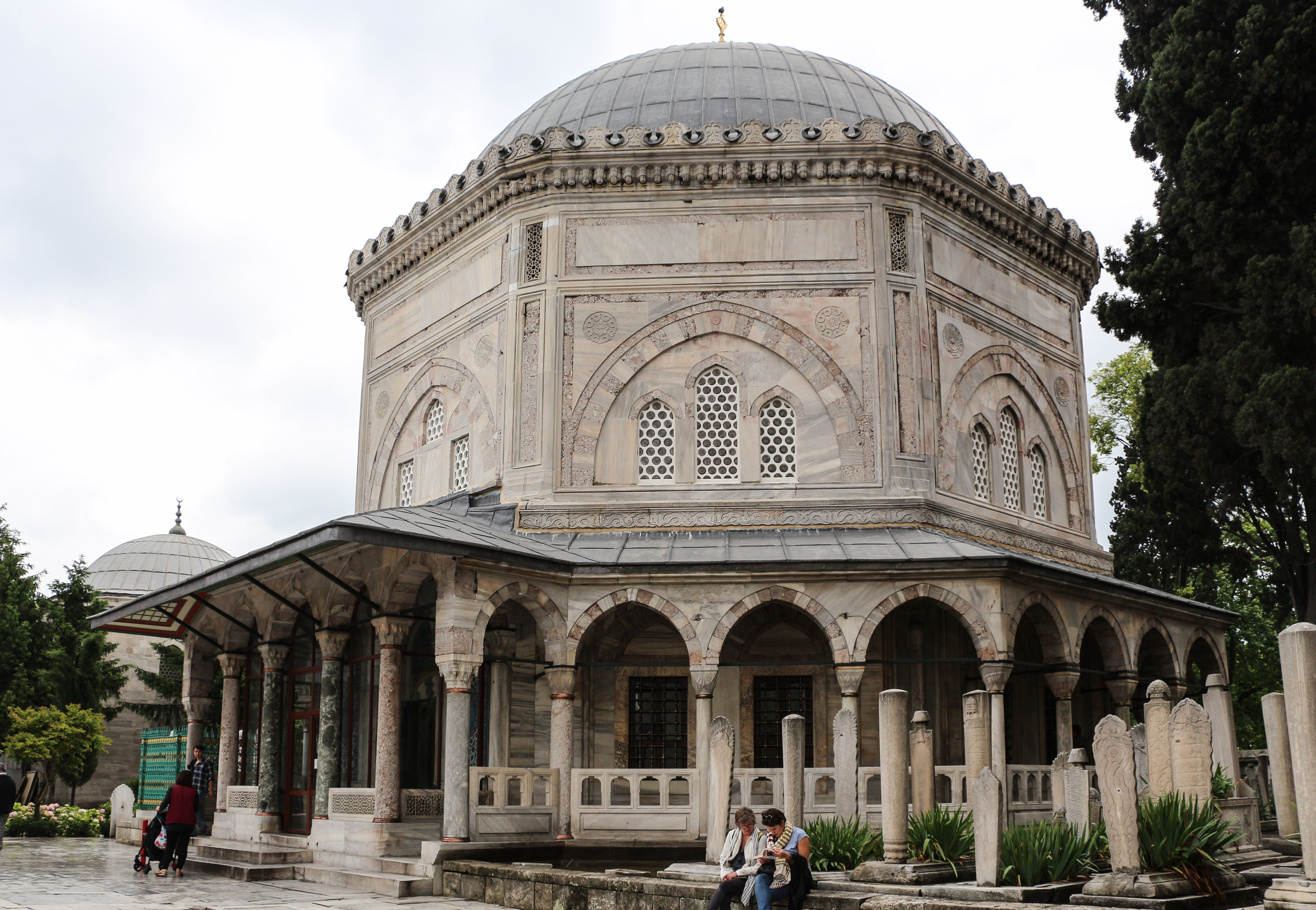
Mausoleum of Suleiman the Magnificent

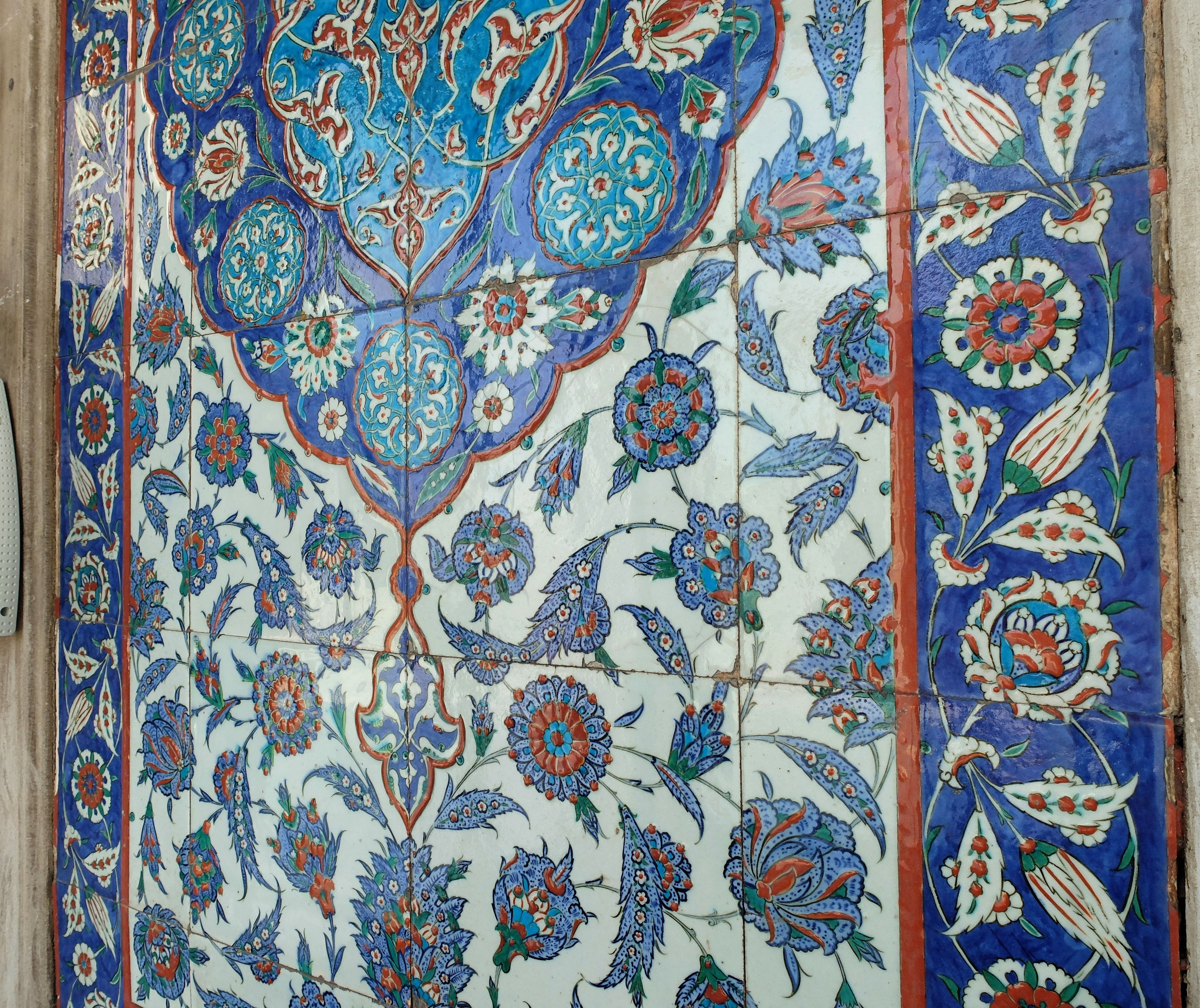
Detail of Iznik tiles under the portico of Suleiman's mausoleum

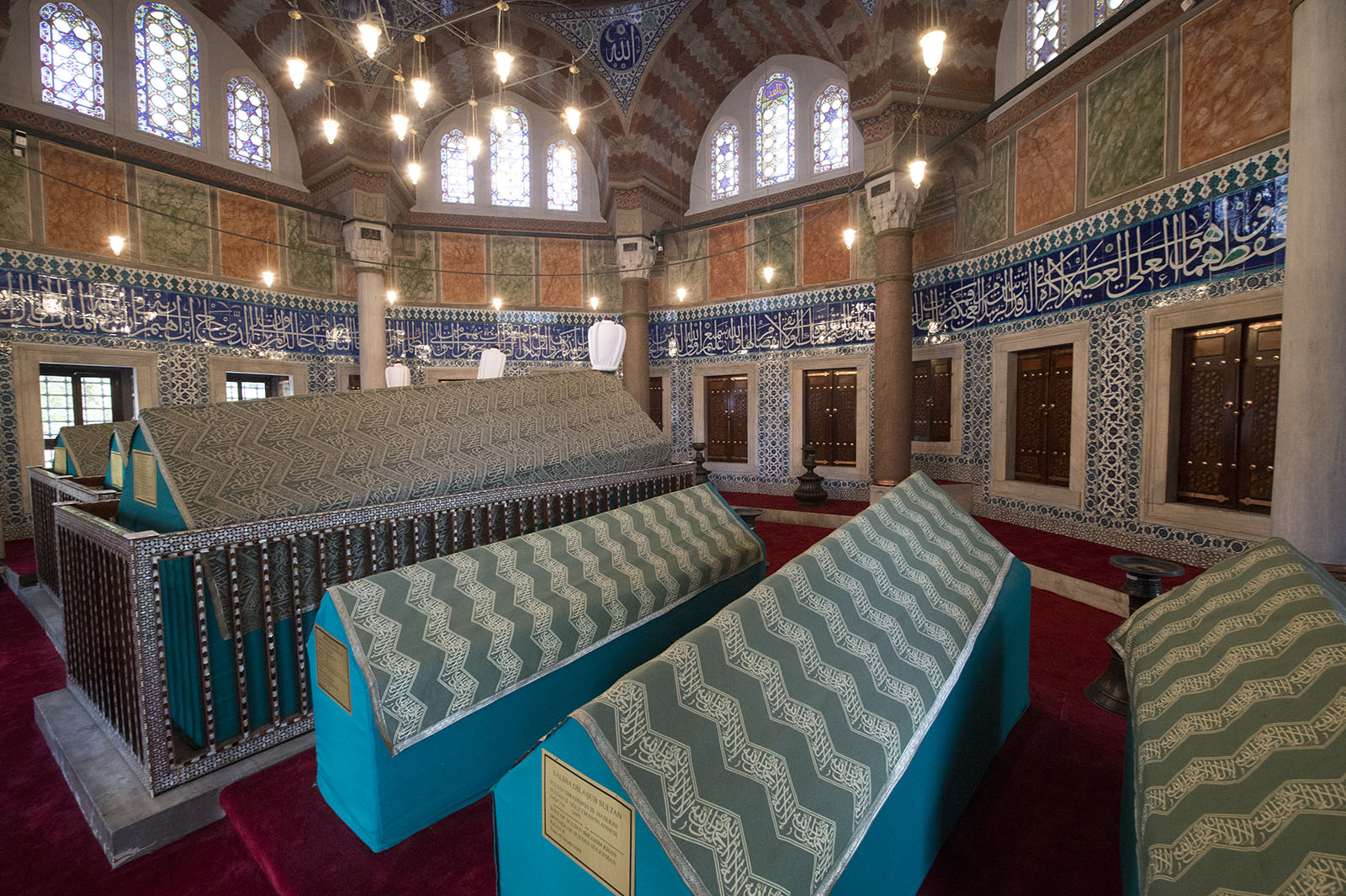
Interior of Suleiman's mausoleum

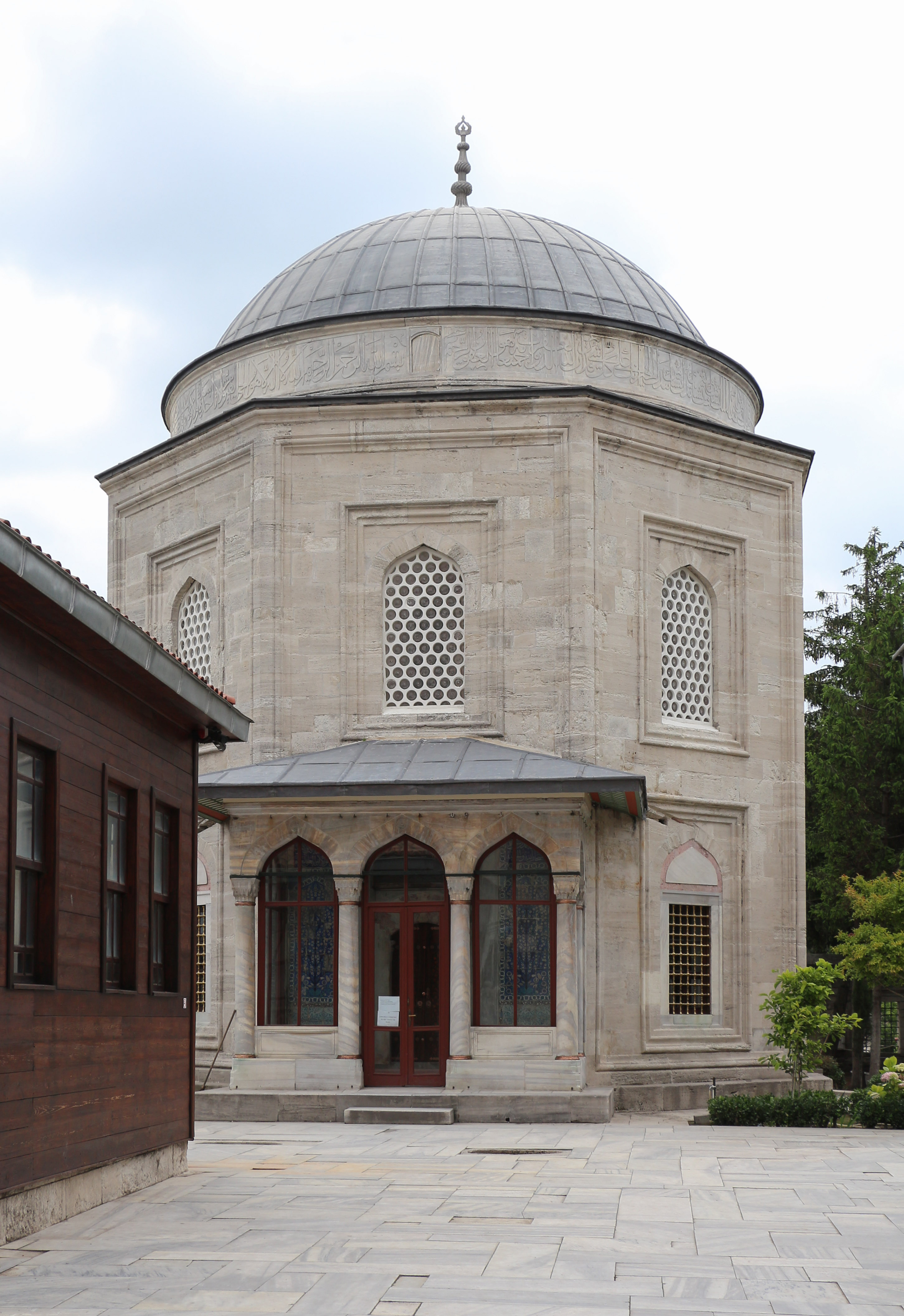
Mausoleum of Hürrem Sultan (Roxelana)

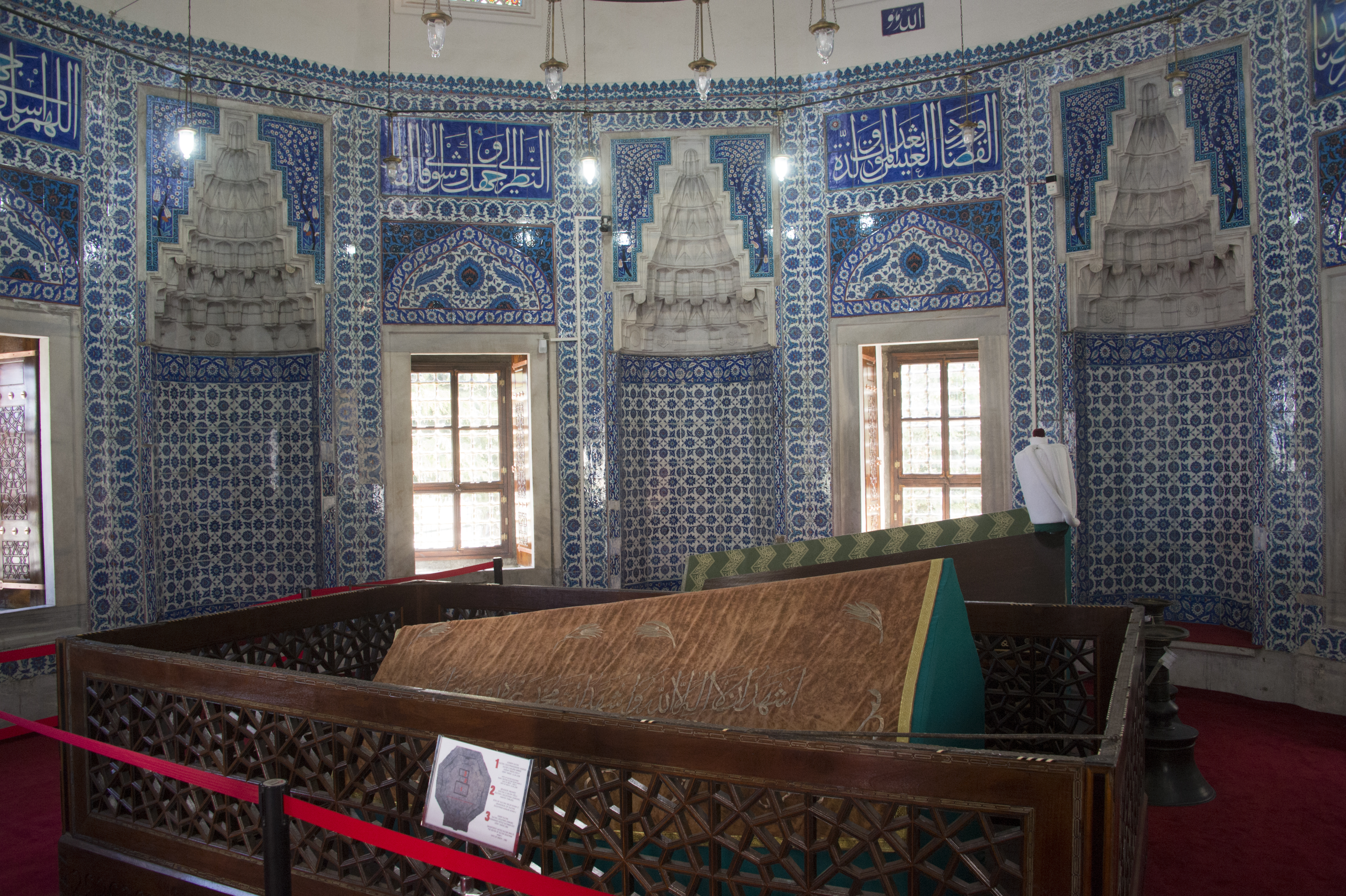
Interior of Hürrem Sultan's mausoleum

=== Other buildings ===
As with other imperial mosques in Istanbul, the Süleymaniye Mosque was designed as a külliye, or complex, with adjacent structures to service both religious and cultural needs. The mosque incorporates the everyday needs for an Islamic community such as prayer, education, health and much more. Due to the sloping nature of the site around the mosque, many of the structures are built above massive substructures that created a more level ground. Vaulted rooms existed in these substructures and were probably put to various uses.

The original complex consisted of the mosque itself, four madrasas or religious colleges (medrese), a small primary school (mekteb), a medical school (darüttıb), a hospital (darüşşifa or timarhane), a public kitchen (imaret) that served food to the poor, a caravanserai or guesthouse (tabhane), public baths (hamam), a specialized school (darülhadis) for the learning of hadith, a small domed building for the employees of the cemetery (attached to the latter's southeast wall), and rows of small shops integrated into the outer edges and along the street on the southwest side of the mosque. Many of these structures are still in existence. The former imaret has been converted into a restaurant. The former hospital is now a printing factory owned by the Turkish Army. Just outside the complex walls, to the north is the tomb of architect Sinan. It was completely restored in 1922.

Most of the buildings are classical Ottoman courtyard structures consisting of a rectangular courtyard surrounded by a domed peristyle portico giving access to domed rooms. In the madrasas, Sinan modified some details of the typical layout for functional reasons. The Salis Medrese and Rabı Medrese, located on the northeast side of the mosque where the ground slopes down towards the Golden Horn, have a "stepped" design in which the courtyard descends in three terraces connected by stairs while the domed rooms are built at progressively lower levels alongside it. The current remains of the hadith school (darülhadis) have been crudely restored. It consists of a long line of small vaulted rooms on the eastern edge of the complex. According to Doğan Kuban, the original school must have had a different appearance. The triangular plaza between this structure and the courtyard was once used for weekly wrestling matches.

The two other madrasas, on the southwest side, are known as the Sani Medrese and Evvel Medrese and have regular floor plans on flatter ground. Of the medical school (darüttıb or Tıp Medrese) next to these, not much has survived except for the rooms on the northeast side. All three of these madrasas are fronted by shops on their northeast sides (the sides facing the mosque), which contributed revenues to the complex. This created a market street known as the Tiryaki Çarșısı, the "Antidote Market", due to the former presence of coffee houses and shops devoted to the smoking of hashish. A small primary school (sibyan mekteb), consisting of two domed rooms, is attached to the eastern corner of the Evvel Medrese, though separated from the main building by a narrow garden.

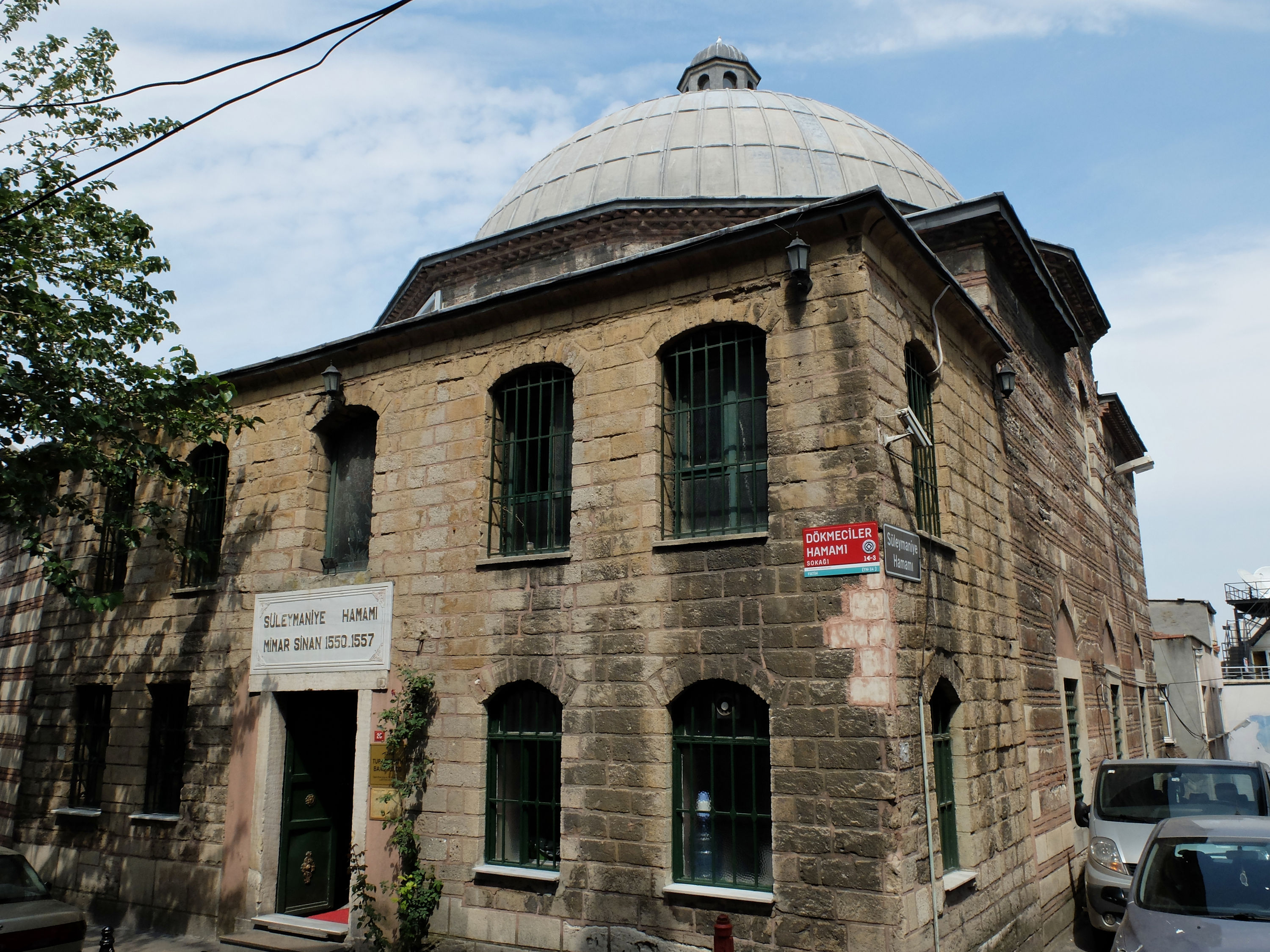
Exterior of the Süleymaniye Hamam (bathhouse)

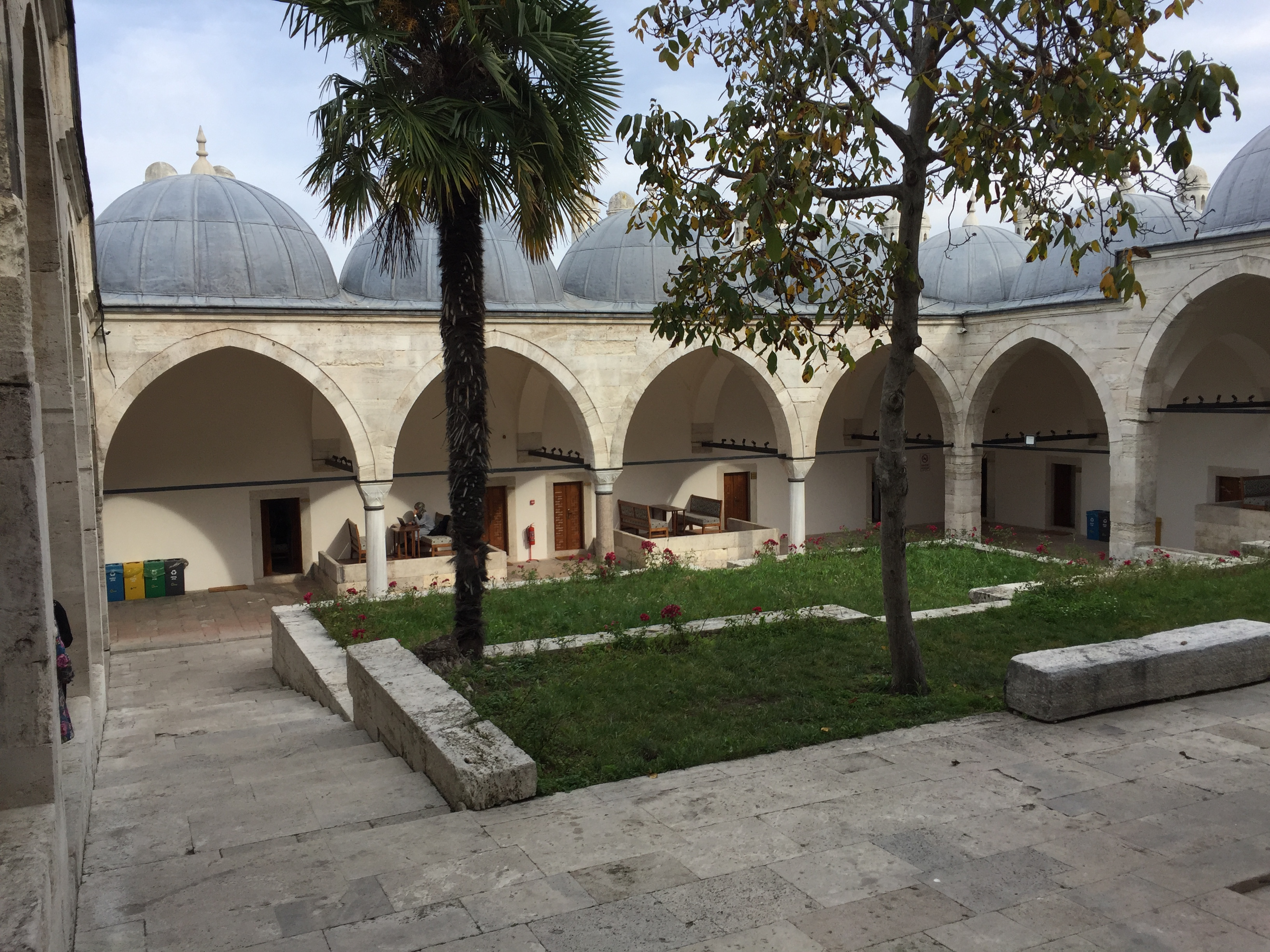
The sloped courtyard of the Salis Medrese, one of the four madrasas of the complex

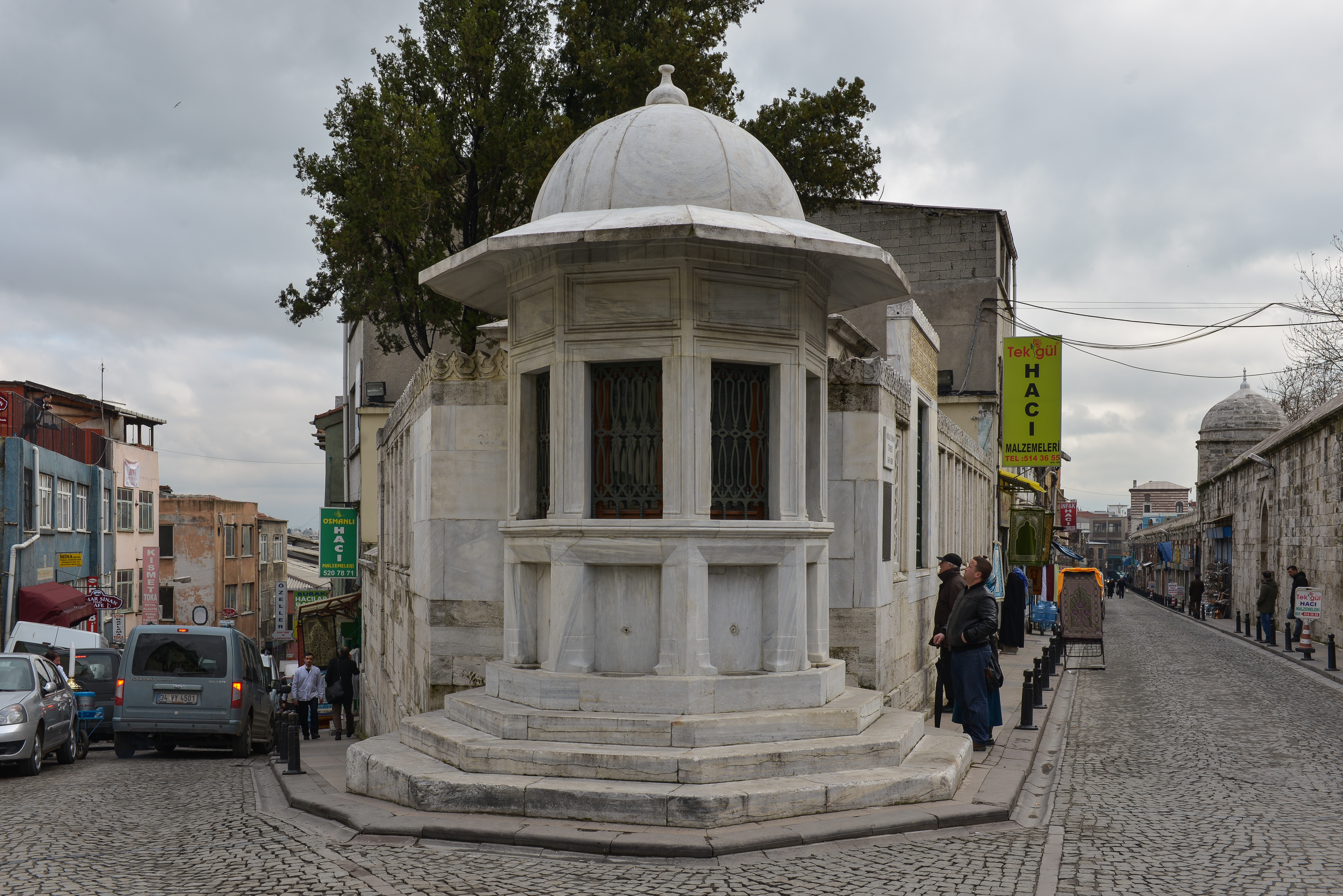
Tomb of Mimar Sinan

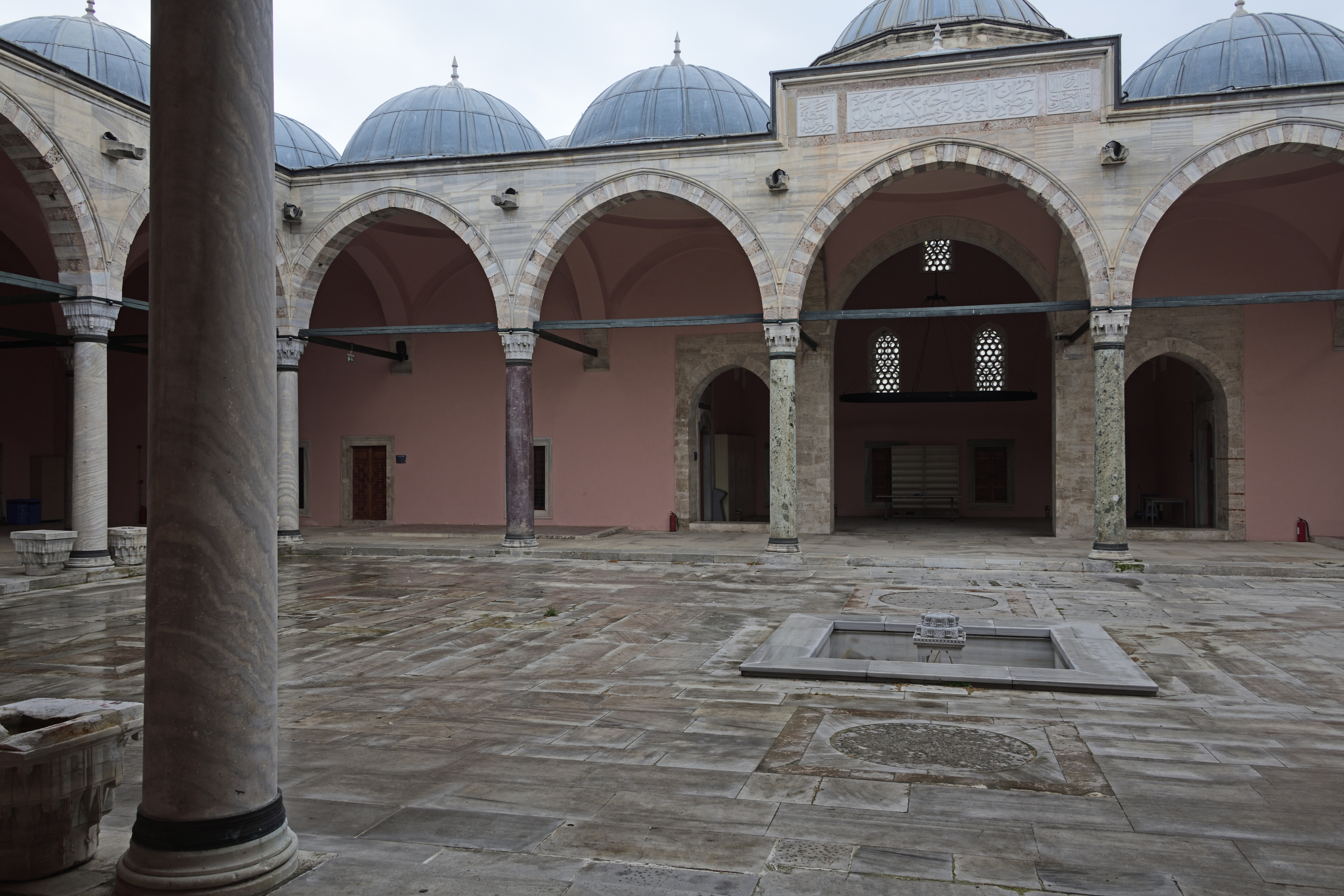
Interior of the tabhane or caravanserai (guesthouse)

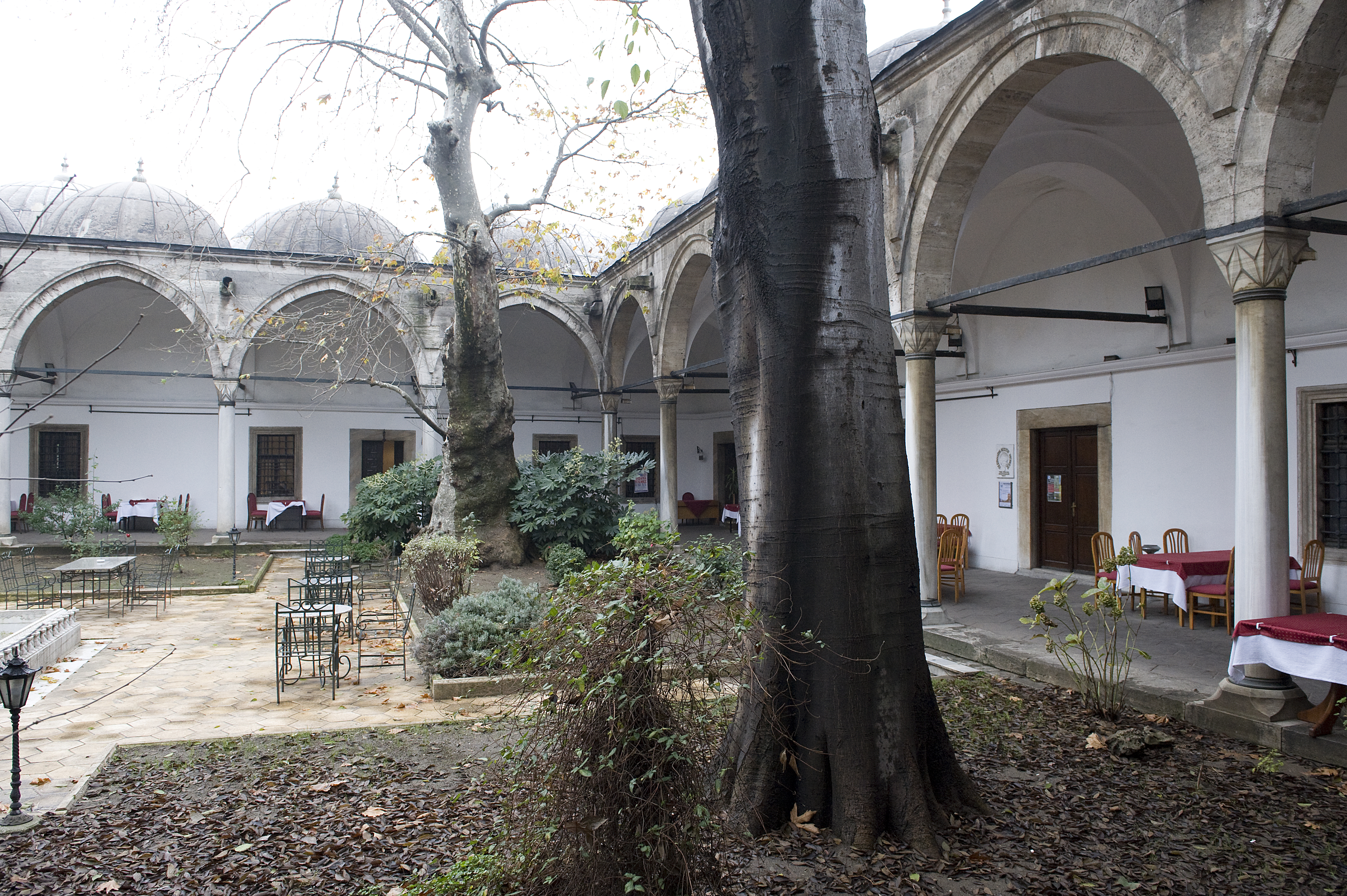
Interior of the imaret (public kitchen)

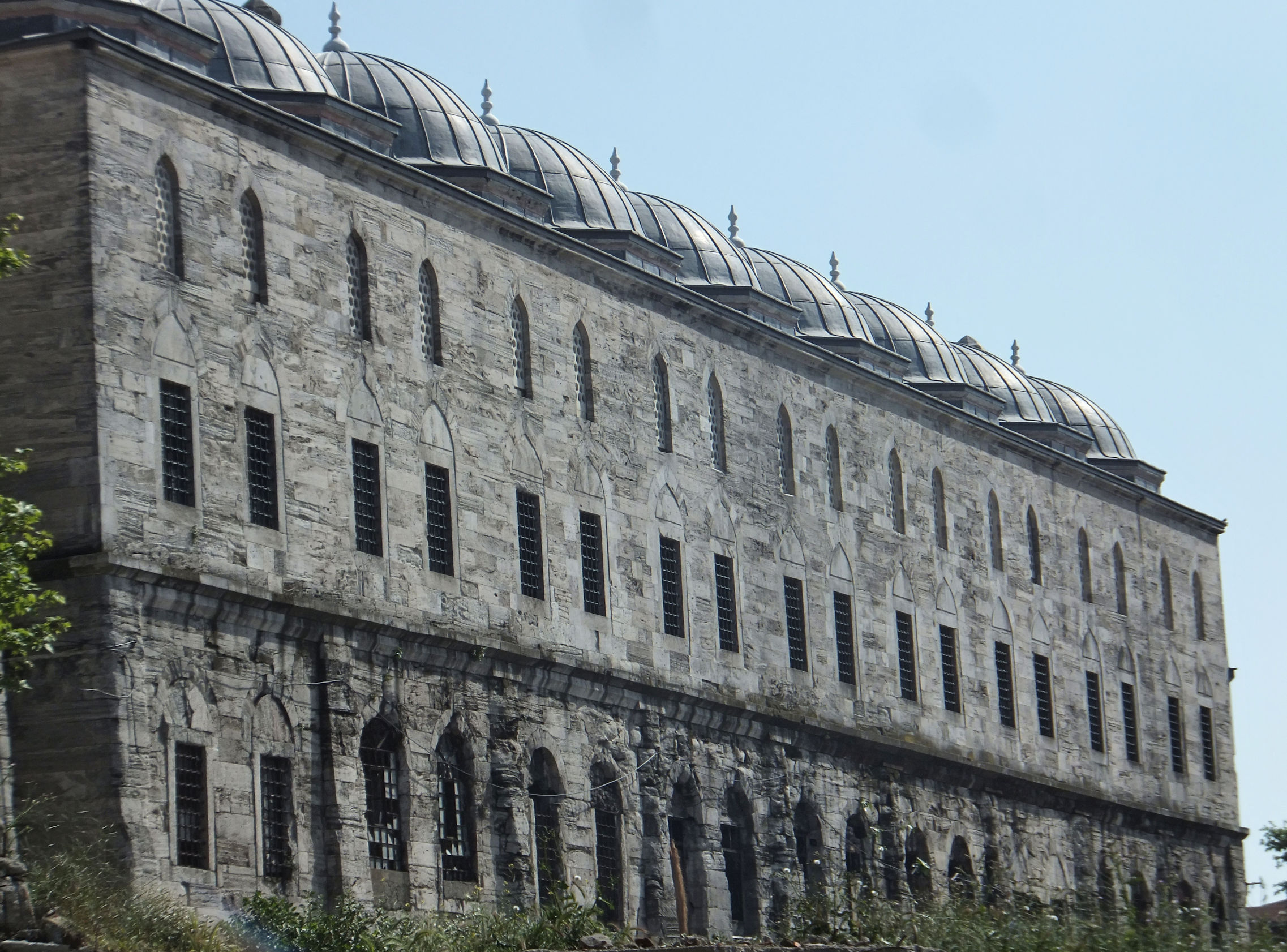
Back side of the darüşşifa (hospital), with the substructure visible below

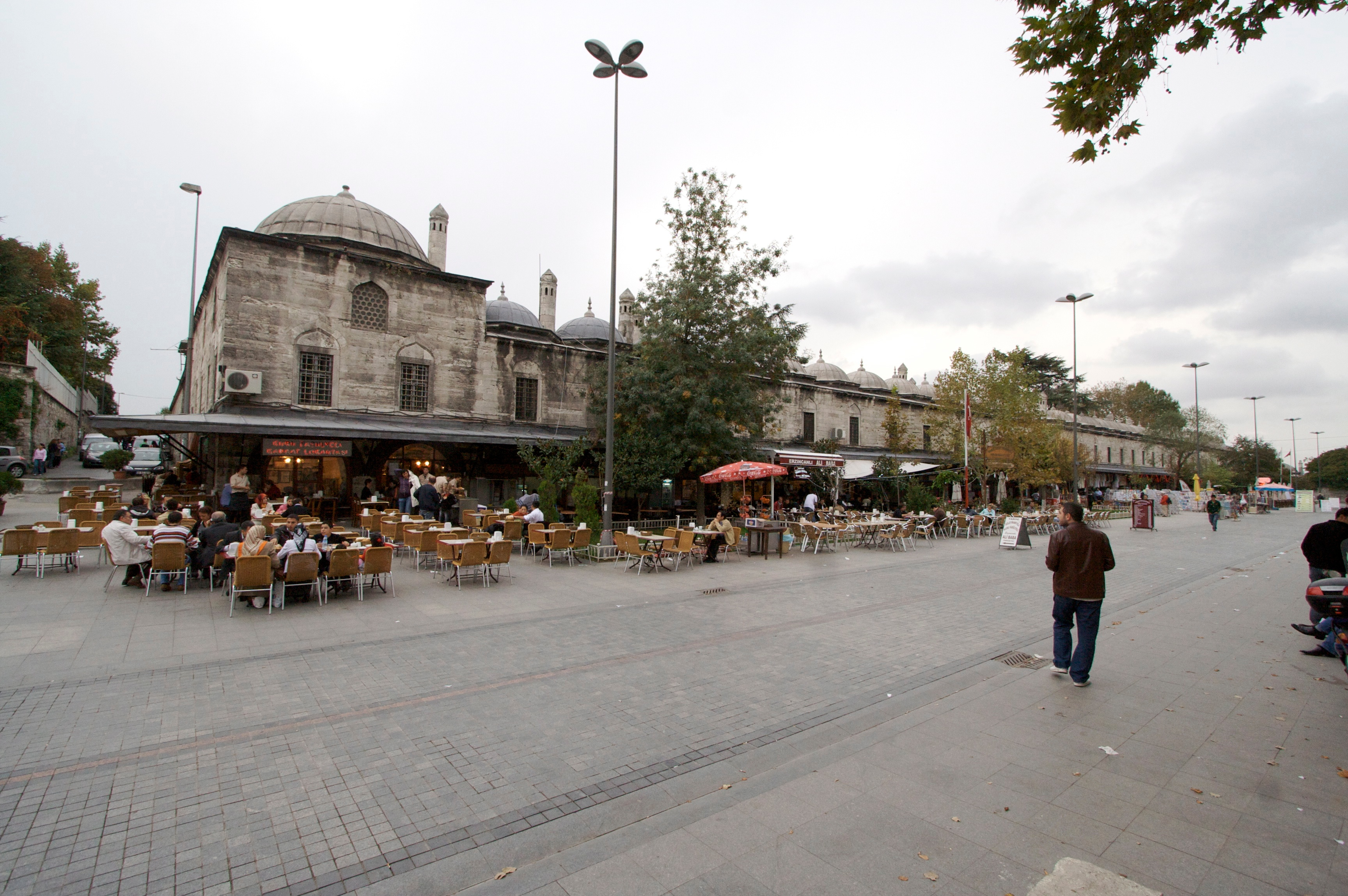
The Evvel Medrese, as seen from the market street on its east side. The domed chamber on the left corner is part of the mekteb (primary school).

== Burials ==
- Suleiman I (1494–1566)
- Hürrem Sultan (1505–1558), Suleiman's wife
- Mihrimah Sultan (1522–1578), Suleiman and Hürrem's daughter
- Ahmed II (1642/43–1695)
- Rabia Sultan (d. 1712), Ahmed's consort
- Asiye Sultan (1694–1695), Ahmed II and Rabia's daughter
- Suleiman II, (1642–1691)
- Aşub Sultan (d. 1690), Suleiman II's mother

== See also ==
- List of Friday mosques designed by Mimar Sinan
- List of mosques in Istanbul
- List of tallest structures built before the 20th century
- Symbolism of domes

== Sources ==
- Atasoy, Nurhan; Raby, Julian (1989). Petsopoulos, Yanni (ed.). Iznik: The Pottery of Ottoman Turkey. London: Alexandria Press. ISBN 978-1-85669-054-6.
- Baer, Marc David (2004). "The great fire of 1660 and the Islamization of Christian and Jewish space in Istanbul". International Journal of Middle East Studies. 36 (2): 159–181. doi:10.1017/S002074380436201X. JSTOR 3880030. S2CID 161640738.
- Blair, Sheila S.; Bloom, Jonathan M. (1995). The Art and Architecture of Islam 1250-1800. Yale University Press. ISBN 9780300064650.
- Denny, Walter B. (2004). Iznik: the Artistry of Ottoman Ceramics. London: Thames & Hudson. ISBN 978-0-500-51192-3.
- Goodwin, Godfrey (1971). A History of Ottoman Architecture. London: Thames & Hudson. ISBN 978-0-500-51192-3.
- Neci̇poğlu-Kafadar, Gülru (1985). "The Süleymaniye Complex in Istanbul: an interpretation". Muqarnas. 3: 92–117. doi:10.2307/1523086. JSTOR 1523086.
- Kuban, Doğan (2010). Ottoman Architecture. Translated by Mill, Adair. Antique Collectors' Club. ISBN 9781851496044.
- Necipoğlu, Gülru (2005). The Age of Sinan: Architectural Culture in the Ottoman Empire. London: Reaktion Books. ISBN 978-1-86189-253-9.
- Neci̇poğlu, Gülru (2008). "The Dome of the Rock as Palimpsest: 'Abd al-Malik's Grand Narrative and Sultan Süleyman's Glosses". Muqarnas. 25: 17–105. doi:10.1163/22118993_02501004.
- Sumner-Boyd, Hilary; Freely, John (2010). Strolling through Istanbul. London: Tauris Parke. pp. 199–208. ISBN 978-1-84885-154-2.
