= Ümmugülsüm Sultan (daughter of Mehmed IV) =

Ottoman princess (1677–1720)

Ümmügülsüm Sultan
- Born: c. 1677; Topkapı Palace, Constantinople, Ottoman Empire (now Istanbul, Turkey)
- Died: 9 May 1720 (aged 42–43); Constantinople, Ottoman Empire
- Burial: Mausoleum of Turhan Sultan, New Mosque, Istanbul, Turkey
- Spouse: Silahdar Çerkeş Osman Pasha (m. 1693)
- Issue: Mihrişah Hanımsultan; Hatice Hanımsultan; Fatma Hanımsultan
- Dynasty: Ottoman
- Father: Mehmed IV
- Mother: Emetullah Rabia Gülnuş Sultan
- Religion: Sunni Islam

Ümmügülsüm Sultan (Ottoman Turkish: ام کلثوم سلطان; c. 1677 – 9 May 1720), also called Ümmi Sultan or Gülsüm Sultan, was an Ottoman princess, the daughter of Sultan Mehmed IV and his Haseki Emetullah Rabia Gülnuş Sultan. She was the sister of Sultans Mustafa II and Ahmed III.

== Early life ==
Ümmügülsüm Sultan was born circa 1677. She was the daughter of Mehmed IV and his Haseki Emetullah Rabia Gülnuş Sultan. She had two full brothers, Mustafa II and Ahmed III, and three full sisters, Hatice Sultan, Ayşe Sultan and Fatma Emetullah Sultan.

== Marriage ==
Her father was deposed in 1687, and was unable to arrange a marriage for her. He was succeeded by her uncle, Sultan Ahmed II, who loved her very much. He arranged her marriage to Silahdar Çerkes Osman Pasha. The wedding took place on 15 December 1693 in the Edirne Palace. Her dowry was fixed at 600,000 kuruş. The wedding was also attended by Sultan Ahmed's consort Rabia Sultan. The couple were given Sinan Pasha Palace as their residence. The two together had three daughters, Mihrişah Hanımsultan (died in 1701), Hatice Hanımsultan (died in 1698) and Fatma Hanımsultan (1699–1730).

All her daughters were buried with Ümmügülsüm in Turhan Turbesi, New Mosque.

== Death ==
Ümmügülsüm Sultan died on 9 May 1720 of smallpox, and was buried in the mausoleum of her grandmother Turhan Sultan, at New Mosque, Istanbul, Turkey.

== See also ==
- List of Ottoman princesses

== Ancestry ==
Ancestors of Ümmugülsüm Sultan (daughter of Mehmed IV)

16. Mehmed III
8. Ahmed I
17. Handan Sultan
4. Ibrahim
9. Kösem Sultan
2. Mehmed IV
5. Turhan Sultan
1. Ümmi Sultan
3. Gülnuş Sultan

== Sources ==
- Agha, Silahdar Findiklili Mehmed (2012). ZEYL-İ FEZLEKE (1065-22 Ca.1106 / 1654-7 Şubat 1695).
- Agha, Silahdar Findiklili Mehmed (2001). Nusretnâme: Tahlil ve Metin (1106-1133/1695-1721).
- Uluçay, M. Çağatay (1992). Padişahların Kadınları ve Kızları. Ankara: Türk Tarih Kurumu Basımevı. ISBN 978-9-751-60461-3.
- Uluçay, Mustafa Çağatay (2011). Padişahların kadınları ve kızları. Ankara: Ötüken. ISBN 978-9-754-37840-5.
