= Emetullah Sultan (disambiguation) =

Emetullah Sultan may refer to:

- Emetullah Rabia Gülnuş Sultan (c. 1642 - 1715) - Haseki of Ottoman Sultan Mehmed IV, mother of Mustafa II and Ahmed III
- Fatma Emetullah Sultan (c. 1679 - 1700) - Ottoman princess, daughter of Mehmed IV and Emetullah Rabia Gülnuş Sultan
- Emetullah Sultan (1701 - 1727) - Ottoman princess, daughter of Mustafa II
- Emetullah Kadın (dead in 1740) - consort of Ottoman Sultan Ahmed III
