= Hatice Sultan (daughter of Mehmed IV) =

Ottoman princess, daughter of Mehmed IV and Gülnüş Sultan

- Born: c. 1660; Edirne Palace, Edirne, Ottoman Empire
- Died: 5 July 1743 (aged 82–83); Edirne, Ottoman Empire
- Burial: Mausoleum of Turhan Sultan, New Mosque, Eminönü, Istanbul
- Spouse: Kuloğlu Musahip Mustafa Pasha (m. 1675; died 1686) Damat Hasan Pasha (m. 1691; died 1713)
- Issue: First marriage Sultanzade Mehmed Bey; Sultanzade Hasan Bey; Sultanzade Vasıf Bey; Sultanzade Ali Bey; Sultanzade Abdullah Bey; Second marriage Rukiye Ayşe Hanımsultan
- Dynasty: Ottoman
- Father: Mehmed IV
- Mother: Gülnuş Sultan
- Religion: Sunni Islam

Hatice Sultan (Ottoman Turkish: خدیجه سلطان; c. 1660 – 5 July 1743) was an Ottoman princess, the daughter of Mehmed IV and Gülnuş Sultan. She was the sister of Sultans Mustafa II and Ahmed III.

== Early life ==
Hatice Sultan was born in 1660 to Mehmed IV and his favourite consort Gülnuş Sultan. She was the eldest child and the first daughter of her parents. She was the older sister of Sultans Mustafa II and Ahmed III and princesses Ayşe Sultan, Fatma Emetullah Sultan and Ümmügülsüm Sultan.

== Marriages ==
Hatice Sultan married in 1675 to Kuloğlu Musahip Mustafa Pasha, the Admiral of the Fleet, when she was fifteen years old. The engagement was scheduled to took place after Mehmed's arrival from the Polish campaign. The engagement took place on 21 June 1675. Nine days later, on 30 June 1675, the wedding took place and on the same day her brothers Mustafa and Ahmed were circumcised. A complete 20-day wedding celebration took place in Edirne on the account of her wedding.

The dowry that Mehmed gave for her wedding amazed the travellers in Edirne at the time. The dowry of Hatice Sultan was carried by eighty-six mules, and the mules were covered with robe fabrics. There were also many carpets, rugs, beds and tablecloths. Apart from decorated porcelain candle holders and gold candlesticks, pearl boots, shoes, slippers and horseshoes, bracelets decorated with precious stones, choker necklaces, earrings, small size binoculars decorated with jewels, stools covered with pearls and jewellery were the most eye-catching dowry. In addition to these, seven sugar chests, eight sugar proxies and two garden models made of sugar were placed in the procession. The wedding was held in Edirne, theater-like entertainment was organized and banquets were held. The cost of the wedding and the circumcision ceremony was funded from the imperial treasury and equalled around 34 million akçe. The reason behind Mehmed had arranged the wedding ceremony lavishly in Edirne was to revive its previous prestige, as for almost two hundred years, the centre of attention was Istanbul. The princess was transferred to her palace on 4 July 1675. The couple had five sons together.

Musahip Mustafa Pasha died in October 1686. Following the death of her husband, her sons were enrolled in the Enderun School by their grandfather Mehmed; however, they died at a young age. Her father decided to marry her to Yeğen Osman Pasha; the marriage could only be held if Osman Pasha destroyed the thug in Anatolia. Unfortunately, the next year, Mehmed was deposed from the throne, and the marriage could not take place.

In 1691, her uncle Suleiman II arranged her marriage to his close-friend Moralı Hasan Pasha, who served as a Grand Vizier and the Governor of Egypt twice. The wedding took place on 13 March 1691. They were given the Sinan Pasha Palace as their residence. They had a daughter. When her brother Mustafa became the sultan, he executed Grand Vizier Sürmeli Ali Pasha, and later appointed Elmas Mehmed Pasha as the grand vizier, Hatice gifted a sable fur coat to the new grand vizier.

Hasan Pasha was exiled to Izmit in 1704. Hatice Sultan decided to go with Hasan Pasha to Izmit. She asked her brother, the new Sultan Ahmed III for permission to go with her husband. He approved of her departure. She lived there for three years. In 1707, Hasan Pasha was pardoned and sent to Egypt as the governor of Egypt, Tripoli and Kütahya, whereas Hatice returned to Istanbul. After the death of Hasan Pasha in December 1713 in Urfa, where he had served as the governor of Rakka Eyalet. She never married again.

== Political influence ==
Hatice maintained a level of influence on her brother Ahmed. She was influential during the Tulip era, a period of peace and prosperity that lasted from 1718 to 1730, alongside her niece Fatma Sultan.

During the end of Ahmed's reign, she became his sole adviser and she gained political influence, moreover on the eve of the Patrona Halil rebellion, she reportedly had advised her brother to sacrifice the life of Grand Vizier Nevşehirli Damat Ibrahim Pasha in order to save his own life, although Ahmed followed her advise, his dethronement was still followed.

Hatice also repeatedly had feted her brothers in her palaces. On the eve of Patrona Halil rebellion in 1730, she was holding a banquet for the Sultan and the Grand Vizier, as well as a crowd of high-ranking dignitaries, at her palace in Üsküdar, she in fact have been blamed for preventing the Grand Vizier from moving into Istanbul to fight against the rebels, which ultimately led to his death.

== Charities and properties ==
Hatice Sultan had constructed primary school, fountains, public baths and mosques in Istanbul and Edirne. In 1711, she built a fountain in Istanbul. On 12 June 1676, Hatice was granted the Halil Pasha Palace in Soğukçeşme, and the gardens on Ayvansaray. She was also granted lands that once belonged to Ayşe Sultan and Fatma Sultan, daughters of Sultan Ahmed I and Kösem Sultan, thus the aunts of her father Mehmed.

Hatice also repaired the Yavedud Mosque, which was adjacent to coastal palace in Eyüp, she has added more land into the mosque and reconstructed it. Two of her freed slaves had been buried in that mosque. She contributed greatly to the development of Yavedud neighbourhood, she constructed a primary school, a fountain and six water coolers. In addition to that, she also constructed six shops in the same neighbourhood.

Hatice also owned waterfront palaces in Üsküdar and Çengelköy. In addition to palaces, she also owned several bakeries, she further purchased a mansion in Ortaköy which had various fruit trees. She also owned several farms throughout the city and was one of the richest women in the empire. She annually donated 100 gold coins to the poor and to the holy city of Medina. In 1719, she repaired the Tarpancı Mosque. She also donated variously to the poor of Istanbul from the income amassed from her several foundations.

In 1764, four years after her death, a fountain known as the "Hatice Sultan Fountain" was built in Üsküdar by an individual whose name remains lost to history.

Hatice also appears to have been a dedicated collector of Oriental ware. Studies of the Topkapı Palace collections of Chinese porcelains. It has been suggested that the totals for this twenty-five year period and the decade following it were swollen by the incorporation of two massive collections. Her probate inventory turned out to comprise no fewer than sixty-two celadons, 2,303 Chinese porcelains, and twelve European porcelains, adding up to a total of 2,377 pieces. When she married in 1675, she had only 311 porcelains in her trousseau.

== Death ==
Hatice Sultan died on 5 July 1743 at the age of eighty three in Edirne. Her body was brought back to Istanbul and was buried in the mausoleum of her grandmother at Turhan Sultan Türbe of The New Mosque at Eminönü in Istanbul. Hatice lived as a courtier during the reign of six sultans: her father Mehmed IV, her uncles Suleiman II and Ahmed II, her brothers Mustafa II and Ahmed III and nephew Mahmud I. She was one of the longest-lived Ottoman sultanas and was the last surviving child of her parents.

== Issue ==
By her first marriage, Hatice had five sons, all dead in young age:

- Sultanzade Mehmed Bey (1676 – post 1686)
- Sultanzade Hasan Bey (1677 – 1684)
- Sultanzade Çamur Vasif Bey (? – post 1686)
- Sultanzade Abbas Ali Bey (? – post 1686)
- Sultanzade Abdullah Bey (? – post 1686)

By her second marriage Hatice had a daughter:

- Rukiye Ayşe Hanımsultan (post 1691 – 1717)

== In popular culture ==
- In the 2012 Turkish historical television series Bir Zamanlar Osmanlı: Kıyam, Hatice Sultan is portrayed by Turkish actress Türkan Şoray.

== See also ==
- List of Ottoman princesses

== Sources ==
- Uluçay, Mustafa Çağatay (2011). Padişahların kadınları ve kızları. Ankara, Ötüken.
- Özmutlu, Günnaz (2016). IV. Mehmed'in Kızı Hadice Sultan’ın İstanbul’daki Mülkleri ve Vakıfları. Istanbul 29 May University.
- Sakaoğlu, Necdet (2008). Bu mülkün kadın sultanları: Vâlide sultanlar, hâtunlar, hasekiler, kadınefendiler, sultanefendiler. Oğlak Yayıncılık. ISBN 978-9-753-29623-6.
- Çakır, Merve (2024). IV. Mehmed'in Ailesi Ve Hanedan Politikası. Istanbul University.
