= Rabia Sultan =

Haseki Sultan of Ahmed II

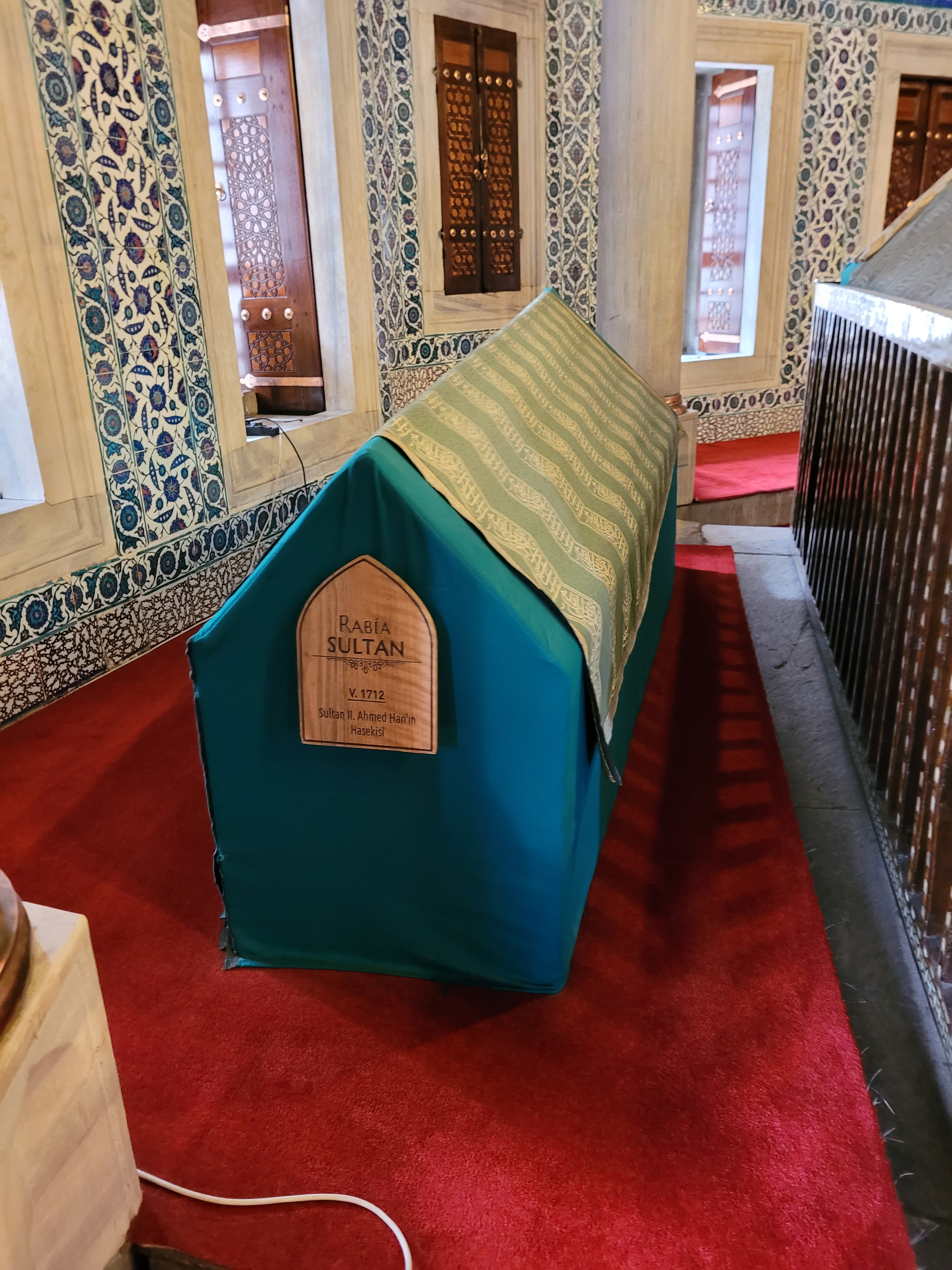
- Sarcophagus of Rabia Sultan, Suleimaniye Mosque

Haseki Sultan of the Ottoman Empire (Imperial Consort)
- Tenure: 11 November 1692 – 6 February 1695
- Predecessor: Emetullah Rabia Gülnuş Sultan
- Successor: title abolished
- Died: 14 January 1712; Old Palace, Beyazıt Square, Constantinople, Ottoman Empire
- Burial: Suleiman the Magnificent Mausoleum, Süleymaniye Mosque, Istanbul
- Consort of: Ahmed II
- Issue: Şehzade Ibrahim; Şehzade Selim; Asiye Sultan
Names
- Turkish: Rabia Sultan; Ottoman Turkish: رابعہ سلطان
- House: Ottoman
- Religion: Sunni Islam (converted)

Rabia Sultan (Turkish pronunciation: [ɾabiˀa suɫtʰan]; Ottoman Turkish: رابعه سلطان, "spring"; died 14 January 1712) was the main consort of Ottoman Sultan Ahmed II and the last Haseki sultan of the Ottoman Empire from 1692 to 1695. She was the last woman to held the title and position of Haseki sultan before it was abolished by Sultan Mustafa II.

== As Haseki Sultan ==
Her origin is unknown, but the consorts of the Ottoman sultans were by custom normally concubines of Christian origin, who came to the Ottoman Imperial harem via the Ottoman slave trade, and converted to Islam and were given a slave name after their arrival.

Since Muazzez Sultan, the mother of Sultan Ahmed, had died in 1687 before his accession to the throne in 1691, when Rabia became Ahmed's favorite she assumed the position of the highest-ranking female member of the royal family, with the title of "Senior Consort".

On 6 October 1692, she gave birth to twin sons, Şehzade Ibrahim and Şehzade Selim, in the Edirne Palace. Following their birth, Ahmed presented her the mansion of Bayburtlu Kara Ibrahim Pasha located in Kuzguncuk. Şehzade Selim died in May 1693.

On 11 November 1692, she was given the title of "Haseki Sultan". Rabia was the last woman in history to have this title and position: after Ahmed II's death, the main consorts of subsequent sultans were titled Kadın, a nonexclusive and less prestigious title. Kara Mustafa Pasha, who had been executed in 1683, had left a large amount of assets that had been placed in the imperial treasury. In December 1692, diamond froggings from these assets ended up on Rabia's fur coat. She also received a diamond crown from the same assets.

In January 1694, Rabia attended the wedding of Ümmügülsüm Sultan, daughter of Mehmed IV, and Silahdar Çerkes Osman Pasha. On 23 October 1694, she gave birth to her third child and only daughter, Asiye Sultan. Following her birth, Ahmed granted her lands in Aleppo.

Rabia is believed to have been very wealthy, as evidenced by an archive document from Topkapı Palace dated 28 November 1694, which records that Gevherhan Sultan, daughter of Ibrahim I , and thus Ahmed's sister or half-sister, had large debts, most of which were owed to Rabia Sultan. In a document dated 1 December 1694 , it is recorded that some of those debts were covered by the transfer of some of Gevherhan Sultan's properties and income to Asiye Sultan, Ahmed and Rabia's infant daughter. Gevherhan Sultan, daughter of Sultan Ibrahim, and Rabia's sister-in-law, is understood to have been in great debt, according to Topkapı Palace archives dating 28 November 1694, a substantial amount of which was owed to Rabia.

Some of the debts mentioned were covered by the allocation of Gevherhan's grants from her hass, that is revenue-producing estates to Asiye Sultan, the infant daughter of Ahmed and Rabia, as shown in archives dating 1 December 1694.

== Widowhood, later life and death ==
Rabia was widowed following Ahmed's death in February 1695. On 7 March, her son, Şehzade Ibrahim, was put in the care of Valide Sultan Gülnuş, whereas she and her daughter Asiye were sent to the Old Palace in Istanbul, where Asiye died in December 1695.

Rabia Sultan died on 14 January 1712 in the Old Palace, and was buried beside Ahmed II in the mausoleum of Suleiman the Magnificent, Süleymaniye Mosque, Istanbul.

Her son, Şehzade Ibrahim, who became heir apparent in 1703, after Sultan Ahmed III's accession to the throne, outlived her by two years, dying in 1714.

== Issue ==
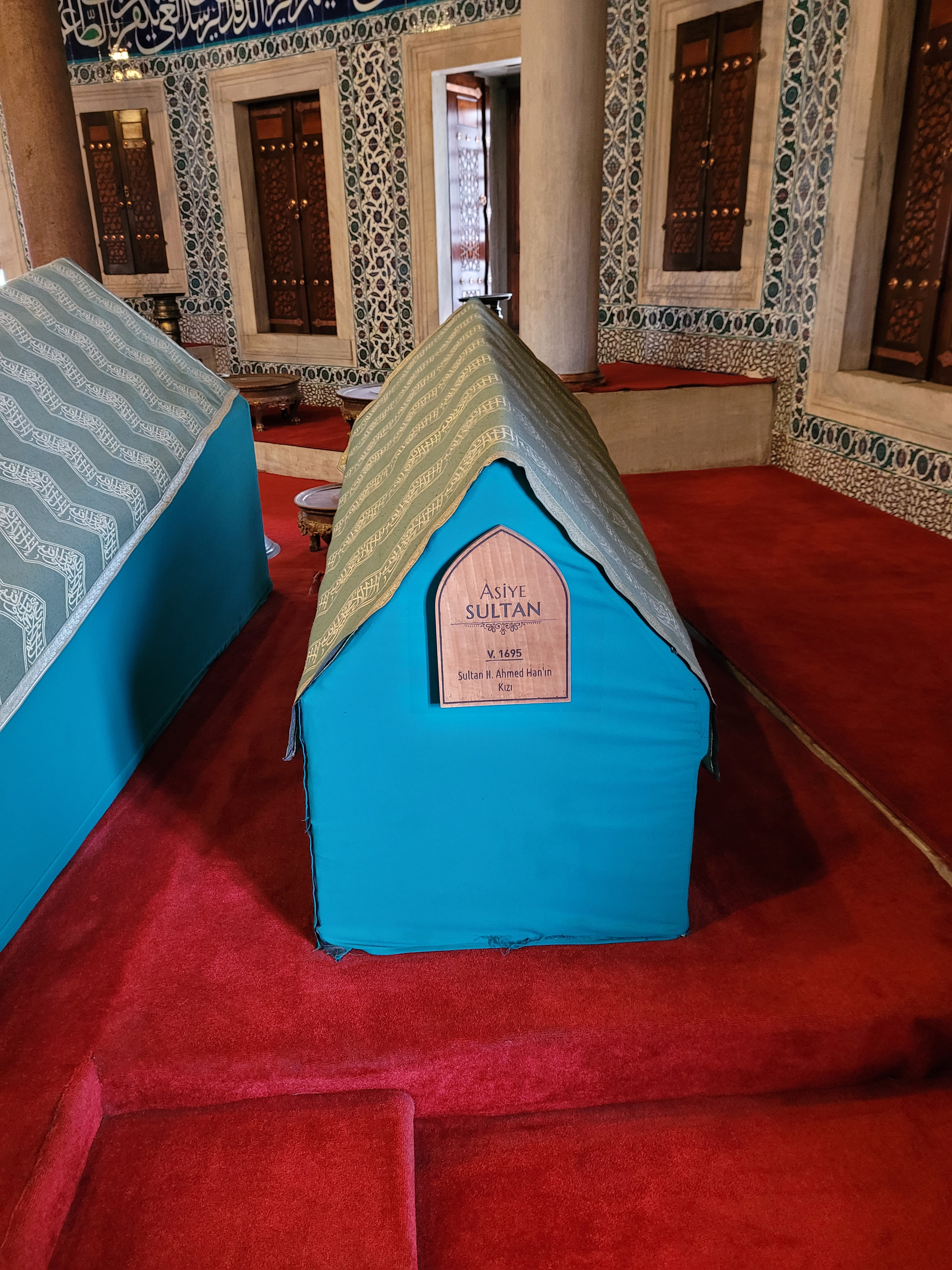
Sarcophagus of Asiye Sultan, Rabia and Ahmed II's daughter

Together with Ahmed, Rabia had three children, twins sons and a daughter:

- Şehzade Ibrahim (Edirne Palace, Edirne, 7 October 1692 – Topkapı Palace, Istanbul, 4 May 1714, buried in Mustafa I Mausoleum, Hagia Sophia), twin of Selim, became Crown Prince on 22 August 1703;
- Şehzade Selim (Edirne Palace, Edirne, 7 October 1692 – Edirne Palace, Edirne, 25 May 1693, buried in Sultan Mustafa Mausoleum, Hagia Sophia), twin of Ibrahim;
- Asiye Sultan (Edirne Palace, Edirne, 24 August 1694 – Old Palace, Costantinople, 9 December 1695, buried with her parents in Suleiman I Mausoleum, Süleymaniye Mosque);

== See also ==
- Ottoman Imperial Harem
- List of consorts of the Ottoman sultans

== Sources ==
- Osmanlıoğlu, Sekan (2018). "Kuzguncuk Asiye Sultan ve Haseki Rabia Sultan Yalıları". Uluslarasi Üsküdar Sempozyumu, no. X.
- Sakaoğlu, Necdet (2008). Bu mülkün kadın sultanları: Vâlide sultanlar, hâtunlar, hasekiler, kadınefendiler, sultanefendiler. Oğlak Yayıncılık. ISBN 978-9-753-29623-6.
- Uluçay, Mustafa Çağatay (2011). Padişahların kadınları ve kızları. Ankara, Ötüken.

=== Primary sources ===
- Silahdar Findiklili Mehmed Agha. Karaçay Türkal, Nazire (ed.). Zeyl-i Fezleke (1065-22 Ca.1106 / 1654-7 Şubat 1695)(Ph.D. diss, 2012)
- Agha, Silahdar Findiklili Mehmed (2001). Nusretnâme: Tahlil ve Metin (1106-1133/1695-1721).

Ottoman royalty
Preceded by Gülnuş Sultan	Haseki Sultan; 11 November 1692 – 6 February 1695	None Title abolished
