= Saliha Sultan (mother of Mahmud I) =

Valide Sultan of the Ottoman Empire from 1730 to 1739

- Valide sultan
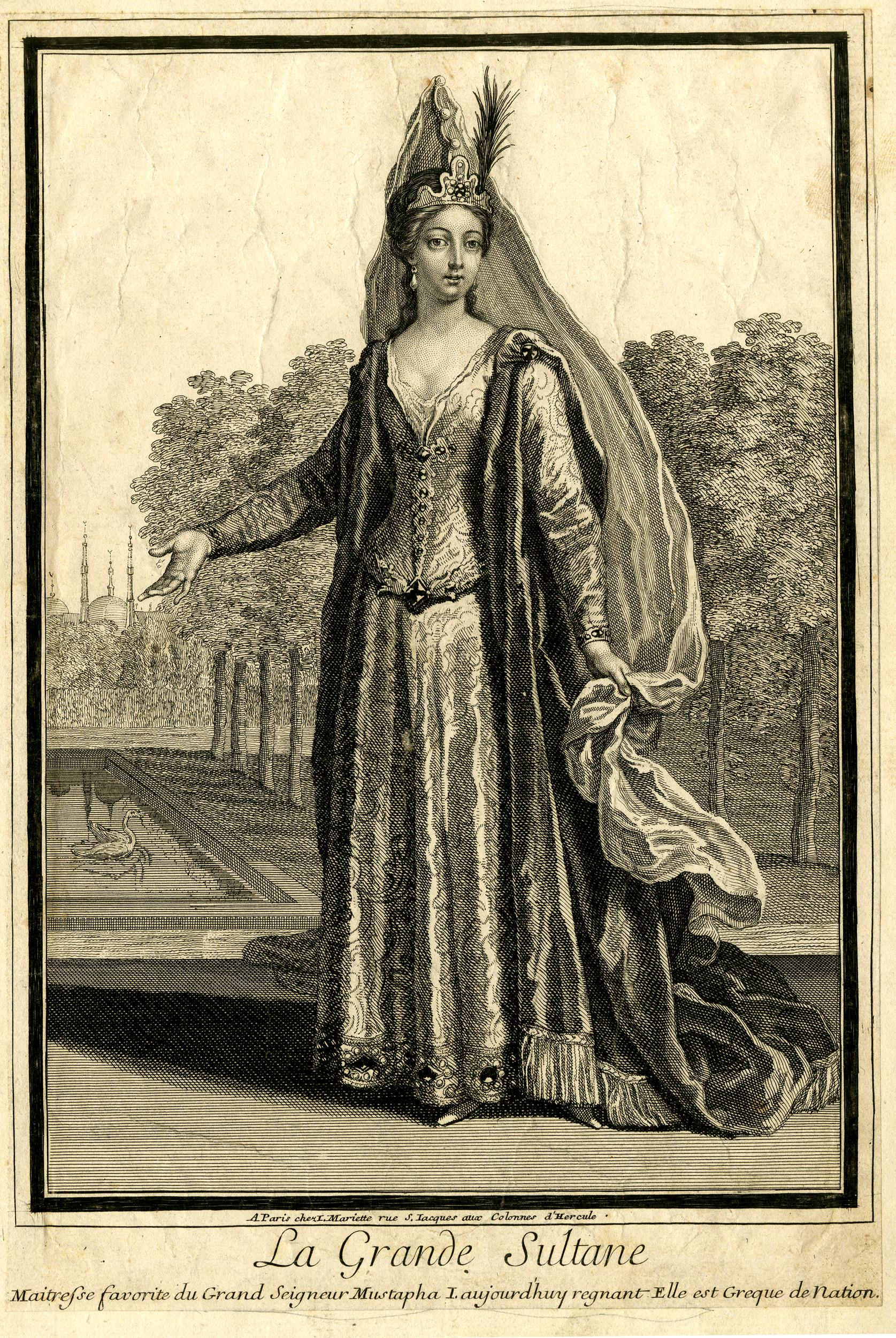

Valide sultan of the Ottoman Empire
- Tenure: 20 September 1730 – 21 September 1739
- Predecessor: Gülnuş Sultan
- Successor: Şehsuvar Sultan
- Born: c. 1680
- Died: 21 September 1739 (aged 58–59); Tırnakçı Palace, Constantinople, Ottoman Empire
- Burial: Turhan Hatice Sultan Mausoleum, New Mosque, Eminönü, Constantinople
- Consort: Mustafa II
- Issue: Mahmud I
Names
- Turkish: Saliha Sultan; Ottoman Turkish: صالحہ سلطان
- Religion: Sunni Islam

Saliha Sebkati Sultan (Ottoman Turkish: صالحه سلطان; c. 1680 – 21 September 1739) was a consort of Sultan Mustafa II of the Ottoman Empire, and Valide sultan to their son, Sultan Mahmud I.

== Early life ==
Her origins and former name are unknown. She became the concubine of Sultan Mustafa, and gave birth to her only child Şehzade Mahmud (later Mahmud I) on 2 August 1696 in the Edirne Palace.

== Widowhood ==
After the Edirne event and the deposal of Sultan Mustafa in 1703, she was transferred to the Old Palace in Istanbul from where she negotiated and sustained her alliances with members from the imperial palace and the urban elite. On the other hand, her son, Şehzade Mahmud was transferred to the Topkapı Palace in Istanbul together with the entire court.

Mahmud's most reliable and influential ally was Saliha, who had the capacity of securing her son's position by virtue of her political experience and the network of alliances which she had built up over the years. She and her son closely cooperated with the chief black eunuch Hacı Beşir Agha, who had presided over the harem since 1717, and therefore bore considerable skills in politics and the survival of the Ottoman dynasty.

== As Valide Sultan ==
=== Mahmud's accession ===
In 1730, her son, who was thirty four years old, was brought to the throne as Mahmud I after the Patrona Revolt, which led to the deposition of his uncle Sultan Ahmed III. As the mother of the new sultan, Saliha, was best positioned to play a conciliatory role, and consolidate the early reign of her son through the alliances she had built over time and prior to his accession. She filled the vacuum left since the death of her predecessor Gülnuş Sultan in 1715, and became a power. Although she became Valide Sultan at the age of fifty, Saliha maintained her beauty and was more beautiful than the consorts of her son, Mahmud. Saliha was influential in the matters of the palace and was a patroness of art in the era known as the Tulip era.

The rabble-rouser Patrona Halil, though he was raiding high at the time, thought it necessary to have an interview with both Saliha, and Beşir Agha. Soon after Saliha was installed in the Queen mother's suite in Topkapı Palace, the Venetian bailo, Angelo Emo, sent her twenty four robes, along with perfumes, mirrors, and other feminine fripperies.

Her son ordered the pavilion "Feraḥfezā" (Pleasure Enhancing) to be built for her at Beylerbeyi.

=== Political influence ===
In the early years of Mahmud's reign he frequently changed the grand viziers, supposedly on the advice of Sultan Ahmed who thought he had made a mistake in keeping Nevşehirli Damat Ibrahim Pasha in office so long. The result of this new policy was necessary and without doubt purposefully, the absence of a forceful personality in the post.

During this period there were complaints of excessive influence wielded by Saliha Sultan, and it was said that Kabakulak Ibrahim Pasha, grand vizier in 1731, had to pay considerable sum to Saliha, and Beşir Agha, in order to secure his position. This constant changing of grand viziers left the door open for intrigue, and even the support of his powerful patrons didn't help him in keeping his post very long.

=== Patroness of architecture ===
Saliha performed a series of charitable deeds to contribute to the consolidation of her son's reign, and bring about the legitimacy of the Ottoman dynasty as a whole. Her patronage of water facilities stood in line with the architectural patronage of her mother-in-law Gülnuş Sultan, and comprised the repair and implementation of the Taksim water network and the endowment of fountains opposite the Sitti Hatun Mosque in Kocamustafapaşa, and near the Defterdar Mosque in Eyüp in 1735/36.

She sponsored the construction of over forty new fountains throughout Constantinople, including one on one side of the Yeni Valide mosque in Üsküdar and another in Silivrikapı. The most beautiful fountain she commissioned is the Azapkapı Saliha Sultan Fountain, in 1732, considered one of the masterpieces of water architecture in Constantinople. An anecdote is connected to this fountain: Mustafa II's mother, Gülnüş Sultan, one day saw a girl crying in Azapkapı, while she was waiting for water. That girl was Saliha, who was first brought into the harem and then given to the sultan as his consort. After becoming Valide Sultan, she swore that she would ensure that the neighborhood where she grew up had fresh water available, and hence the fountain.

Her patronage also focused on the renovation of the Galata Arab Mosque in 1734/35, and the establishment of a pious foundation to supplement the salaries of the mosque's servants and provide for the reading of the Mevlid (birth of the Prophet) and parts of the Qu'ran.

Her architectural patronage radiated beyond the capital to encompass the transformation of the Hacı Ömer Mosque in Çengelköy into a congregational mosque which was repaired and endowed with a brick minaret and pulpit. Next to that, she reconstructed the Alaca Minare Mosque in Üsküdar, and restored the congregational mosque in the fortress of Yerevan.

== Death ==
In 1739, Saliha was struck by an unknown severe illness, and was transferred to the Tırnakçı Palace in the hope that she would rehabilitate there. However, she died on 21 September 1739. She was buried in the mausoleum of Turhan Sultan, New Mosque, Istanbul.

== Issue ==
Together with Mustafa, Saliha had one son:

- Mahmud I (Edirne Palace, Edirne, 2 August 1696 - Topkapi Palace, 13 December 1754, buried in Tomb of Turhan Sultan, New Mosque, Istanbul). 24th Sultan of the Ottoman Empire.

== See also ==
- List of Valide Sultans
- List of consorts of the Ottoman Sultans

== Sources ==
- Wielemaker, Alexander Frans (2015). The Taksim water network, 1730-33. Political consolidation, dynastic legitimization, and social networks.
- Uluçay, Mustafa Çağatay (2011). Padişahların kadınları ve kızları. Ankara, Ötüken.
- Sakaoğlu, Necdet (2008). Bu mülkün kadın sultanları: Vâlide sultanlar, hâtunlar, hasekiler, kadınefendiler, sultanefendiler. Oğlak Yayıncılık. ISBN 978-9-753-29623-6.

Ottoman royalty
Preceded by Gülnuş Sultan	Valide Sultan; 20 September 1730 – 21 September 1739	Succeeded by Şehsuvar Sultan
