= Gülnuş Sultan =

Valide Sultan of the Ottoman Empire

Gülnûş Sultan
- Valide sultan
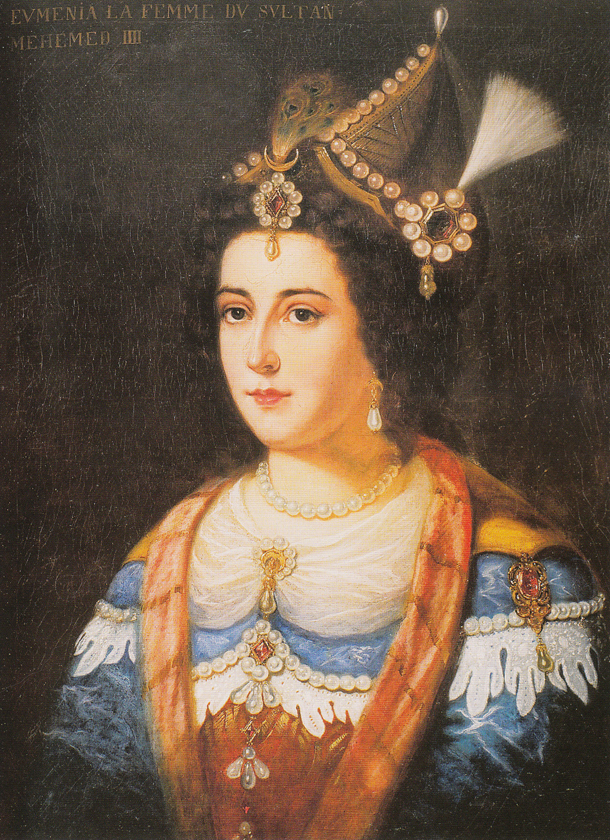
- 19th century portrait

Valide sultan of the Ottoman Empire
- Tenure: 6 February 1695 – 6 November 1715
- Predecessor: Saliha Dilaşub Sultan
- Successor: Saliha Sultan

Haseki sultan of the Ottoman Empire (Imperial Consort)
- Tenure: 6 February 1660 – 8 November 1687
- Predecessor: Turhan Sultan; Saliha Dilaşub Sultan; Muazzez Sultan; Ayşe Sultan; Mahienver Sultan; Saçbağlı Sultan; Şivekar Sultan; Hümaşah Sultan
- Successor: Rabia Sultan
- Born: Evmenia Voria or Eugenie c. 1642; Rethymno, Crete, Republic of Venice
- Died: 6 November 1715 (aged 72–73); Constantinople, Ottoman Empire (now Istanbul, Turkey)
- Burial: Yeni Valide Mosque, Istanbul
- Consort of: Mehmed IV
- Issue: Hatice Sultan; Mustafa II; Ayşe Sultan; Ahmed III; Ümmugülsüm Sultan; Fatma Emetullah Sultan
Names
- Turkish: Emetullah Rabia Gülnuş Sultan; Ottoman Turkish: امت الله رابعه کلنوش سلطان
- House: Ottoman
- Religion: Sunni Islam (converted); Greek Orthodox (birth)

Emetullah Rabia Gülnuş Sultan (Ottoman Turkish: امت الله رابعه کلنوش سلطان; c. 1642 – 6 November 1715), also known as Evmenia, was the chief consort of Ottoman Sultan Mehmed IV, Haseki sultan of the Ottoman Empire from 1660 to 1687, the mother of Ottoman sultans Mustafa II and Ahmed III, and the Valide sultan of the Ottoman Empire from 1695 to 1715.

She was one of the prominent figures during the era of the Sultanate of Women which spanned for nearly 200 years and ended with her death in 1715. She is considered to be the last powerful imperial consort and Valide sultan in Ottoman history.

== Early life ==
Gülnuş Sultan was born in 1642 in the town of Rethymno, Crete, when the island was under Venetian rule, the daughter of a Greek Orthodox priest, and her birth name was Evmania Voria. According to a minor theory, Gülnuş Sultan instead belonged to the Venetian Verzini family which had settled the city.

She was captured by the Ottomans during the invasion of Crete in 1645.

== As Haseki Sultan ==
The Ottoman army invaded the island during the Cretan War; she was captured as a very young girl when the Ottomans conquered Rethymno in 1645, taken as a slave and was sent to Constantinople. She was renamed Emetullah Rabia Gülnuş and was given a thoroughly Ottoman education in the harem department of Topkapi Palace and soon attracted the attention of the Sultan, Mehmed IV, and became his concubine. He was famous for his hunting expeditions in the Balkans and used to take her, his favourite, to these expeditions. She was described as a curvy woman with long black curly hair. They had at least six children, among them two sons both of whom became Sultans, Mustafa II and Ahmed III. Ahmed was born in Dobruca during one of the hunting expeditions of Mehmed IV. Her rivalry with Gülbeyaz, an odalisque of Mehmed IV, led to a tragic end.

Gülnûş Sultan's participation in the campaigns during her 27-year haseki period and her knowledge of political developments, her long haseki period together with Hatice Turhan Valide Sultan as the haseki of Mehmed IV and the mother of Prince Mustafa and Prince Ahmed, and her financial power virtually prepared her for the institution of Valide Sultan. She gained value as she served the Ottoman dynasty, and her status as the sultan's favorite shaped her future. Her participation in male-specific activities, such as hunting and campaigns, thanks to her husband's affection for her, gave her advantages unique to male members of the dynasty. She enjoyed these until her death, earning a place in history through the structures she commissioned and her role in politics. In other words, her harem journey, which began as a female slave, turned out to be more advantageous for her as she prioritized service to the dynasty and embraced masculine roles.

Sultan Mehmed had been deeply enamored of her, but after Gülbeyaz entered his harem, his affections began to shift; Gülnuş, who was still in love with the sultan, became madly jealous. One day, as Gülbeyaz was sitting on a rock and watching the sea, Gülnuş slightly pushed her off the cliff and drowned the young odalisque, or according to others she ordered Gülbeyaz's strangulation in the Kandilli Palace. Some writers stress the fact that Gülnuş was a ruthless person, claiming that she attempted to have her husband's brothers Suleiman II and Ahmed II strangled after she gave birth to her firstborn Mustafa, but Mehmed's mother Turhan Sultan had prevented these attempted murders.

Gülnüş Sultan was aware of the political developments of the time. Indeed, Haseki Sultan participated in the Polish War of 1672 and 1673, along with Mehmed IV and Hatice Turhan Sultan. Similarly, in 1682, during the Second Siege of Vienna, Haseki Sultan joined the regiment when they went to Belgrade. The happiest days of Gülnüş Sultan's life as a haseki occurred in the spring of 1675, at the imperial ceremonies held in Sirık Square of the Edirne Palace for the circumcision of her sons and the marriage of her biological daughters. The Zübde-i vekayiat records that during the ceremonial stages of this wedding, Valide Turhan Sultan and Gülnüş Sultan were represented by their chamberlains in the ranks of viziers. The traveler Tavernier described the circumcision ceremony of Mehmed IV's sons as an elaborate event and noted that Gülnüş Sultan took an active interest in its presentation, including the prince's clothing and use of jewels.

According to Tavernier's account, the circumcision ceremony was seen not by Mehmed IV but by Haseki Sultan, as an opportunity for domestic and foreign politics, and she looked for images that would reflect the wealth of the state and made the sultan accept her views, which reveals that she was an intelligent and foresighted courtier.

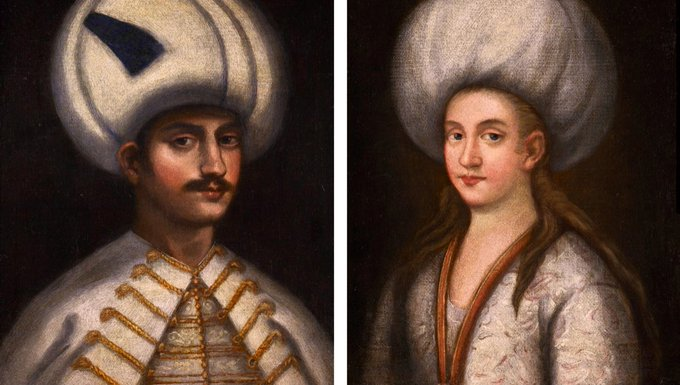
Gulnus Sultan with her husband Sultan Mehmed IV

Gülnüş Sultan's strongest supporters in the harem were Yusuf Ağa, the agha of the court, who had ruled the harem since 1675; Osman Ağa, her chamberlain; and Feyzullah Efendi, the tutor of her son, Prince Mustafa. In 1682, Köprülü Hüseyin Pasha joined this alliance. Indeed, following the failure of the Second Siege of Vienna a year later, he was arrested due to his close ties to the Grand Vizier. After Gülnüş Sultan's intervention and a conversation with the sultan, he was released in 1684 and subsequently removed from the capital, serving as the governor of the Shahrizor province as a two-tongued vizier . Furthermore, in 1686, Feyzullah Efendi enraged Sultan Mehmed IV by tying a horse to the "Bayram Pasha Mansion" meadow in Üsküdar, which belonged to the treasury. Mehmed IV initially attempted to execute Feyzullah Efendi, but when the sultan's advisors explained that executing a scholar was not possible due to custom, Feyzullah Efendi's name was erased from the scholarly register. Five days later, Gülnuş Sultan intervened, and he was pardoned by the sultan. However, his position as tutor to the princes was terminated, and the sultan's imam, İbrahim Efendi, was appointed in his place. Feyzullah Efendi was granted the position of judge of Eyüp, a beneficiary position.

In 1683, she joined a similar large entourage in a procession marking the siege of Vienna. Gülnus also established networks of support within the imperial court. She allied with Yusuf Agha, the chief eunuch of the imperial harem at that time. Her addition, was the administrator of the pious foundation that she founded in 1680 and provided income for a hospital and public kitchens in Mecca. Moreover, Gülnus's chamberlain, Mehter Osman Agha, was an apprentice and protégé of Yusuf Agha.

These relations still remained even after the disastrous collapse of the siege of Vienna in 1683 as a result of which his influence at the court fell sharply. In 1672, Amcazade Hüseyin, nephew of Koprülü Mehmed Pasha, met Mehmed and Gülnus on the way to the Polish war. He later joined her household serving therein for an extended period and became her chief billeting officer in 1682. She also played a role in determining the careers of various statesmen, including the grand vizier Kara Mustafa Pasha. After the failure of the siege of Vienna in 1683, he was stripped of his office and executed, after a considerable lobbying effort of Gülnus and the court eunuchs. She also had influence during the vizierate of Fazil Ahmed Pasha, which rose after Kara Mustafa Pasha's execution.

According to Von Hammer-Purgstal after the death of her mother-in-law Turhan in 1683, Gülnuş became head of the harem ruling it with absolute authority and influencing the fate of the empire until her husband's deposition in 1687.

== As Valide Sultan ==
=== First reign ===
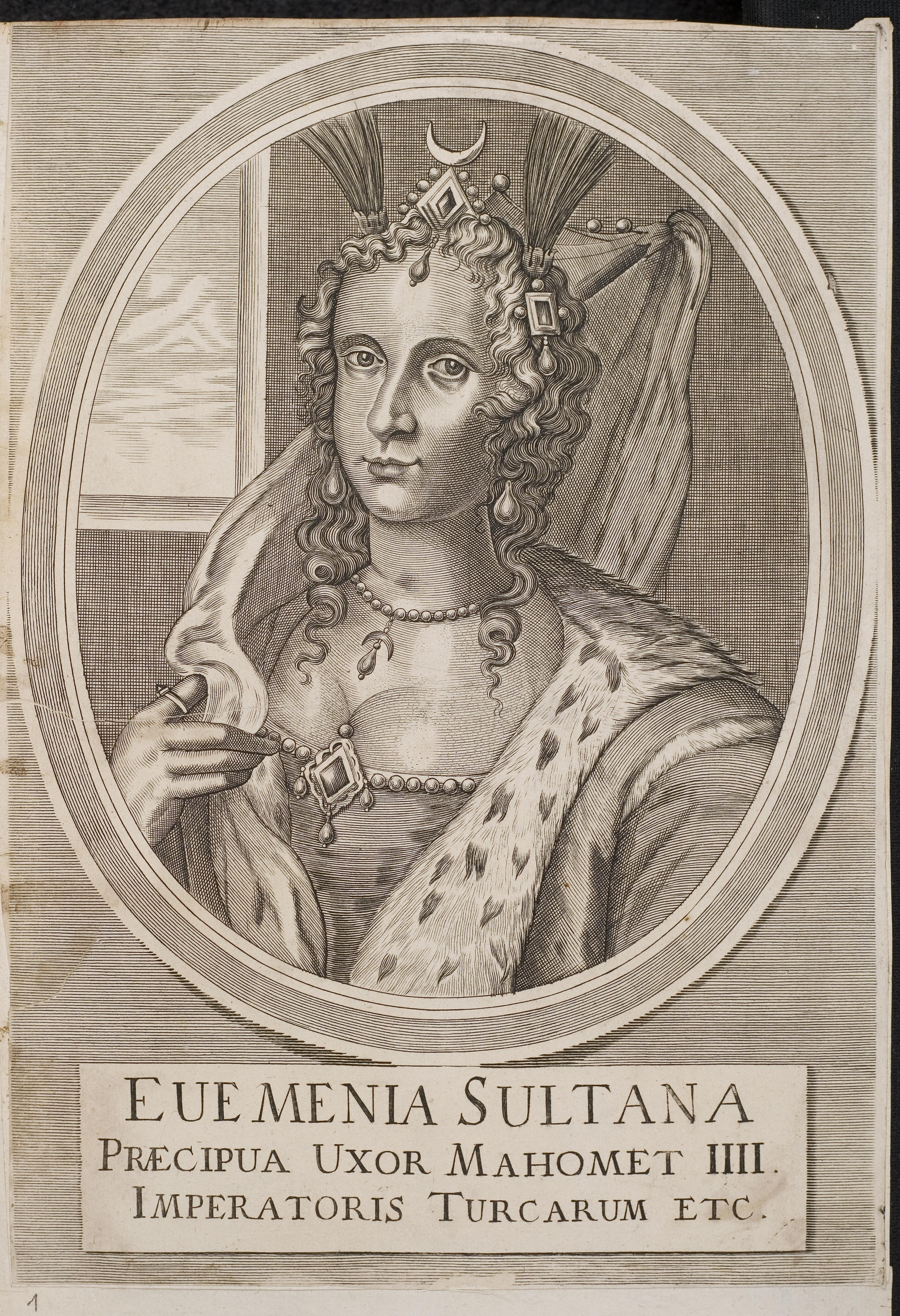
Portrait of Gülnuş Sultan.

She became Valide in 1695 when her older son Mustafa II became the Sultan. She held the position during the reign of two sons. When Mustafa II was dethroned in 1703 the populace blamed Gülnuş, for his preference for Edirne over Constantinople as a place of residence and for the general confusion of life in the capital.

She of course had more freedom of movement and contacts than the consorts. Quite often she accompanied her son. She visited her daughters in their palaces, took part in the wedding of her daughter Fatma Emetullah Sultan at the side of her son, visited her daughter Hatice Sultan in company of the sultan, after she had given birth to a daughter. She looked at parades, visited Eyüb, received the Grand vizier and the Şeyhüislam and accepted invitations by the Grand vizier and the Bostancıbaşı (with her son). She had hass (private domains) and a Kethüda (steward) who administered them for her. Mustafa kept close contacts with his mother, he honored her demonstratively whenever there was an occasion, he sent her information, asked for her well-being and received many, many horses as gifts from her. He even prohibited that anybody should stay in a house in Çorlu, between Constantinople and Edirne, in which his mother had spent a night.

=== Second reign ===
She did have some political importance. In 1703, she was asked to confirm and approve of the succession of her other son, Ahmed III, to the throne, which she also did. Ahmed III thought it prudent to keep her out of sight until the feeling against her had died down. And so, on her return from Edirne, she went to the Old Palace for a time. In 1704, when Gülnüş Sultan wanted to appoint her chief agha, Uzun Süleyman Ağa, as the Darüssaade Ağa, the Grand Vizier Damad Hasan Pasha appeared to the Sultan and warned him:

"This person is already involved in the affairs of the Sultanate in his current position. If he becomes the Kizağa (Girls' Agha), I will not be able to reconcile or communicate with him; independence will pass from me to him! "

Uzun Süleyman was appointed as the Darüssaade Ağa. Hasan Pasha was also removed from the Grand Viziership on 28 September 1704, and Kalaylıkoz Hacı Ahmed Pasha was appointed in his place. This incident proves the influence, Gülnüş Sultan had over her son, while it also demonstrates Ahmed III's loyalty to his mother. Gülnuş Sultan's influence, particularly in the appointment of grand vizier, can be seen in the accounts of period historians and archival documents. In some anthologies apparently penned by Gülnuş Sultan, the warnings given to a newly appointed grand vizier are striking. The anger at defeats against foreign powers, the anxiety over Janissary rebellions, the expectation that they would be kept under control, and the exhortation for everyone to act within their means demonstrate Gülnuş Sultan's experience with recent developments.

She is also attributed to having advised her son to the war with Russia in 1711. In 1709, king Charles XII of Sweden settled in Bender within the Ottoman Empire during his war with Russia. He wished the sultan to declare war against Russia and form an alliance with Sweden. The sultan was rumoured to listen to the advice of his mother, who had a large influence over him. Charles sent Stanislaw Poniatowski and Thomas Funck as his messengers. They bribed a convert named Goin, formerly a Frenchman, who worked as a doctor in the palace. Goin arranged a meeting with the personal slave of the Valide, a Jewish woman, who they gave a personal letter to the Valide. They were also introduced to the Hungarian eunuch Horwath, who became their propaganda person in the harem. The Valide became intrigued by Charles, took an interest in his cause, and even corresponded with him in Bender. On 9 February 1711, Turkey declared war against Russia, as the sultan had been advised to by his mother, who convinced him that Charles was a man worth taking a risk for.

Gulnus wrote two letters to the Swedish king, one dated April 1713. These letters are more significant than the letter to the Crimean Khan, as they demonstrate the Valide Sultan's political influence and role in this matter. Valide Sultan's letter to the king begins with a very warm and sincere address, "My powerful and exalted son." In her letter to the king, Valide Sultan states that she has a deep affection for him and considers him like a son, and that she works day and night for the king. The letters reveal a secret relationship between Valide Sultan and the king, and even that Valide Sultan used the pen name "Dervish Efendi" in her letters to the king. It is understood that Valide Sultan served as an intermediary, providing an unofficial connection between the sultan and the king, and that she negotiated with him on his behalf.

=== Patroness of architecture ===
Among Gülnuş's projects was a complex of buildings which included a mosque, soup kitchen, school, fountain and tomb, built in Üsküdar. She also sponsored the transformation of a church in Galata into a mosque and building of five fountains with which clean water was finally made available to the area. She also made endowments in Edirne, Chios, Mecca, Medina, Kastamonu, and Menemen. After the reconquest of the island of Chios in 1695, a church was converted into a mosque in her name. She also constructed a fountain next to the mosque in Chios.

== Death ==
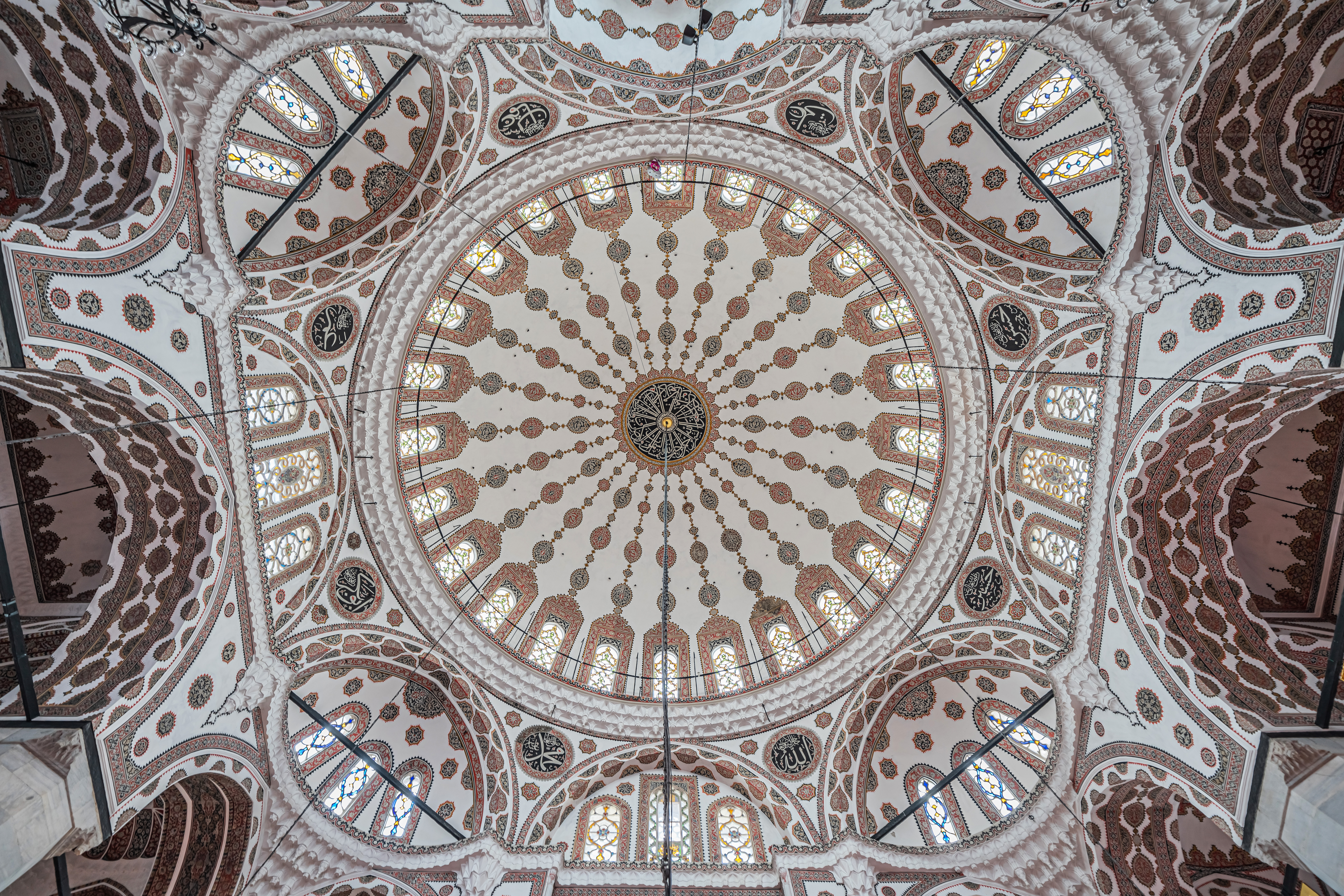
Interior of the dome of the Yeni Valide Mosque (Emetullah Râbi'a Gülnûş Sultan Mosque) in Üsküdar, Istanbul.

Gülnuş Sultan died on 6 November 1715 at the age of 72 or 73 in Istanbul during the reign of her son Ahmed III just before the start of the era of prosperity and peace called the Tulip (Lâle) Era by the Turkish historians. She is buried at a tomb that is open to sky, that is near the mosque she bequeathed to be built at Üsküdar on the Asian side of Istanbul, called the Yeni Valide Mosque or New.

== Issue ==
With Mehmed IV, Gülnuş Sultan had at least two sons and four daughters:

- Hatice Sultan (Edirne, c. 1660 - Edirne, 5 July 1743). She married twice and had five sons and a daughter.
- Mustafa II (Edirne, 6 February 1664 - Constantinople, 29 December 1703). He was the 22nd Sultan of the Ottoman Empire.
- Ayşe Sultan (c. 1668 - unknown). Nicknamed Küçük Sultan, that means "little princess". At the age of two she was betrothed to Kara Mustafa Paşah.
- Ahmed III (Bulgaria, 31 December 1673 - Constantinople, 1 July 1736). He was the first sultan to be born in the province after Suleiman I. He became the 23rd Sultan of the Ottoman Empire, taking the throne after the deposition of his brother.
- Ümmügülsüm Sultan (Constantinople, c. 1678 - Constantinople, 9 May 1720). Also called Ümmi Sultan or Gülsüm Sultan. She was the favorite niece of her uncle Ahmed II, who treated her as his daughter after the deposition of her father, so much so that he kept her at court with him, unlike her sisters. She married once and had three daughters. She was buried in the Yeni Cami Mosque.
- Fatma Emetullah Sultan (Edirne or Constantinople, unknown - died 29 May 1700.) She married twice and had two daughters.

== See also ==
- List of Valide Sultans
- List of consorts of the Ottoman Sultans

== Annotations ==
1. Occasionally, "Mahpare/Mahpara" (moon wedge) is added to her names as first. Occasionally, her name "Emetullah" is transcribed as "Ümmetullah" or "Ümmatullah" instead.

== Sources ==
- Baker, Anthony E. (1993). The Bosphorus. Redhouse Press. p. 146. ISBN 975-413-062-0.
- Gordon, Matthew S.; Hain, Kathryn A. (2017). Concubines and Courtesans: Women and Slavery in Islamic History. Oxford University Press. ISBN 978-0-190-62218-3.

Ottoman royalty
Preceded by Turhan, Dilaşub, Muazzez, Ayşe, Mahienver, Saçbağlı, Şivekar and Hümaşah Sultan	Haseki Sultan; 4 August 1683 – 8 November 1687	Succeeded by Rabia Sultan
Preceded by Dilaşub Sultan	Valide Sultan; 6 February 1695 – 6 November 1715	Succeeded by Saliha Sultan
