= Yeni Valide Mosque =

Mosque in Üsküdar, Istanbul, Turkey

Yeni Valide Mosque at Üsküdar
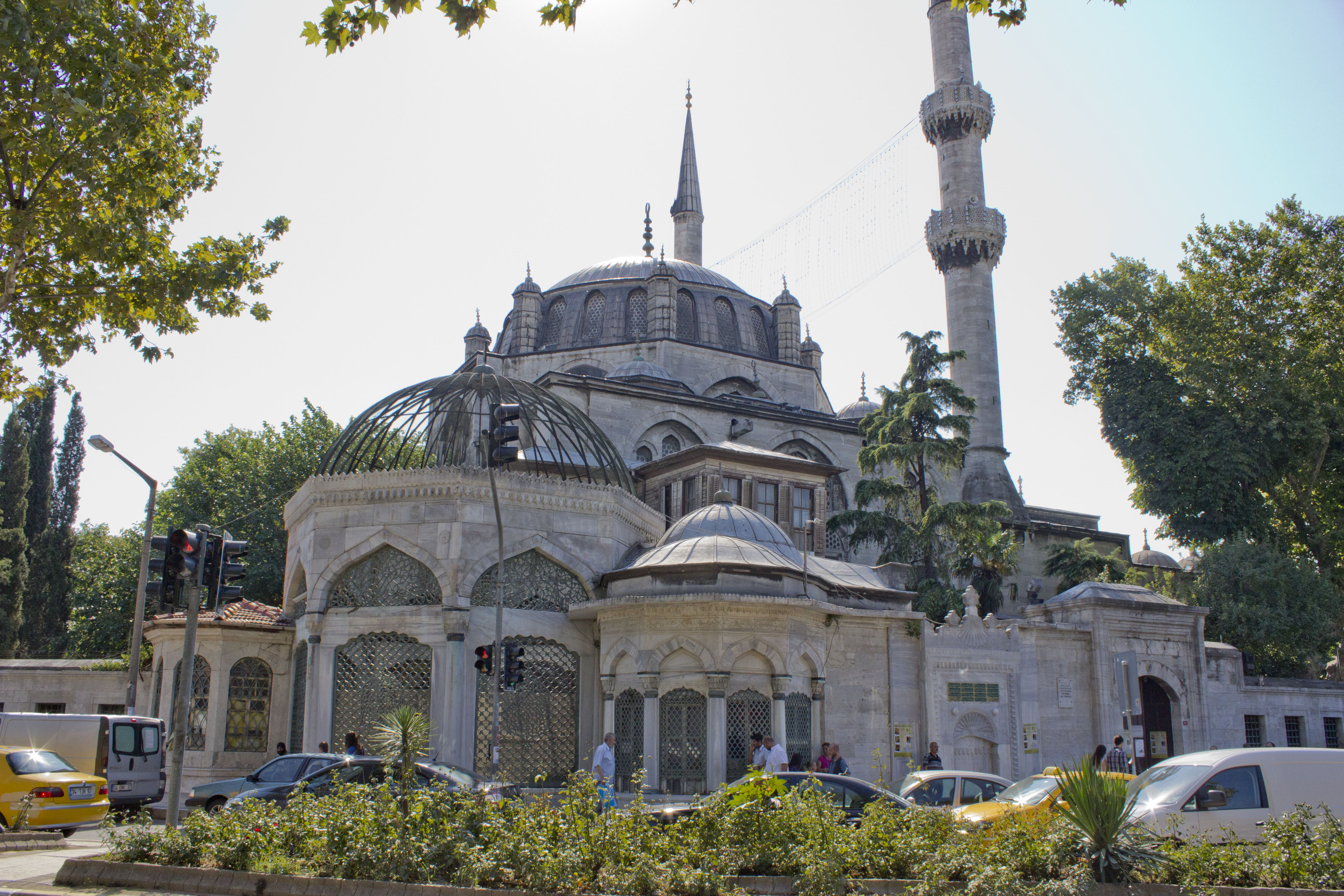

- Location within Istanbul

Religion
- Affiliation: Sunni Islam

Location
- Location: Istanbul, Turkey
- Coordinates: 41.024787°N 29.015107°E

Architecture
- Type: Mosque
- Style: Ottoman architecture
- Groundbreaking: 1708
- Completed: 1710
- Minaret: 2

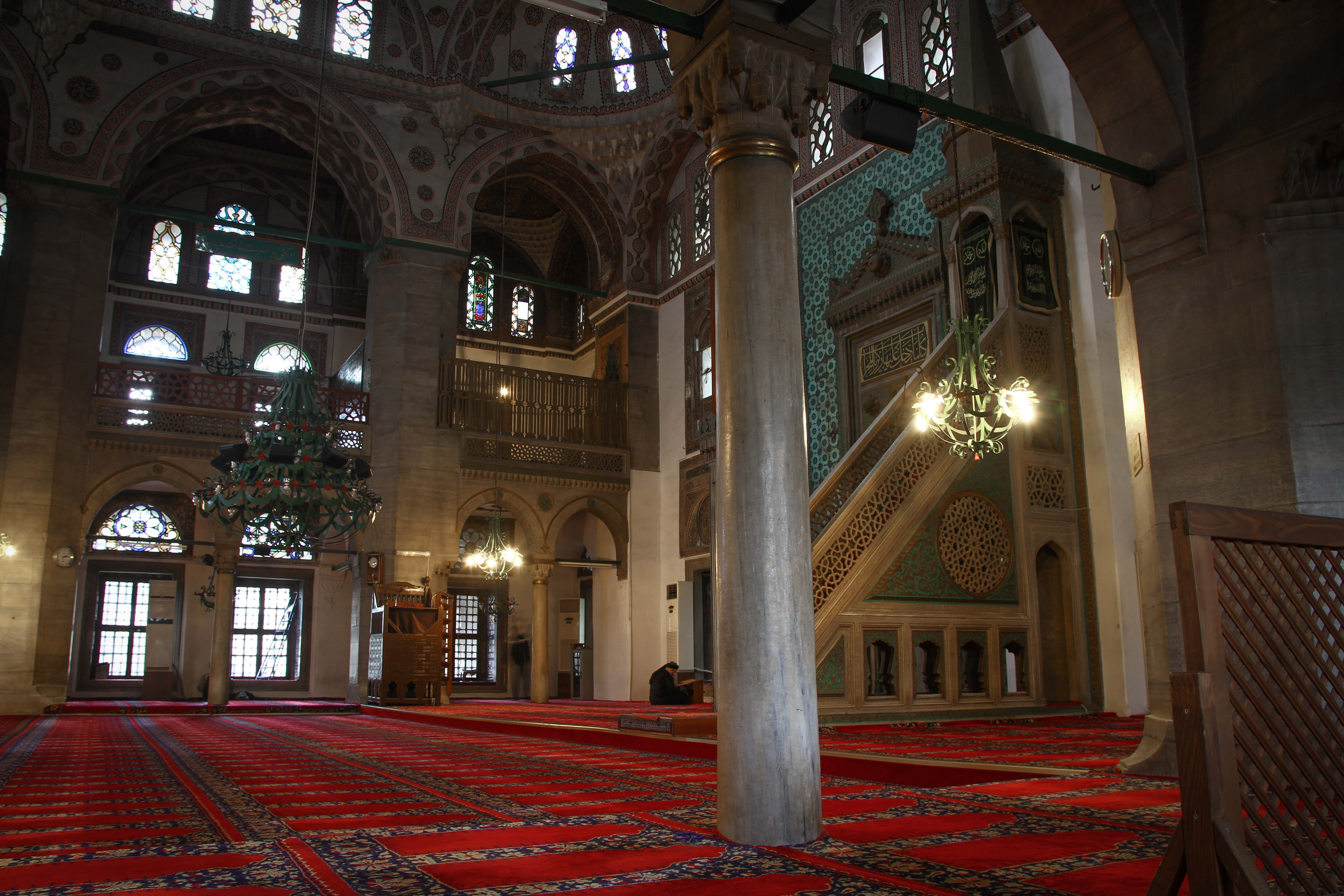
Inside of prayer area, minbar of Yeni Valide Mosque

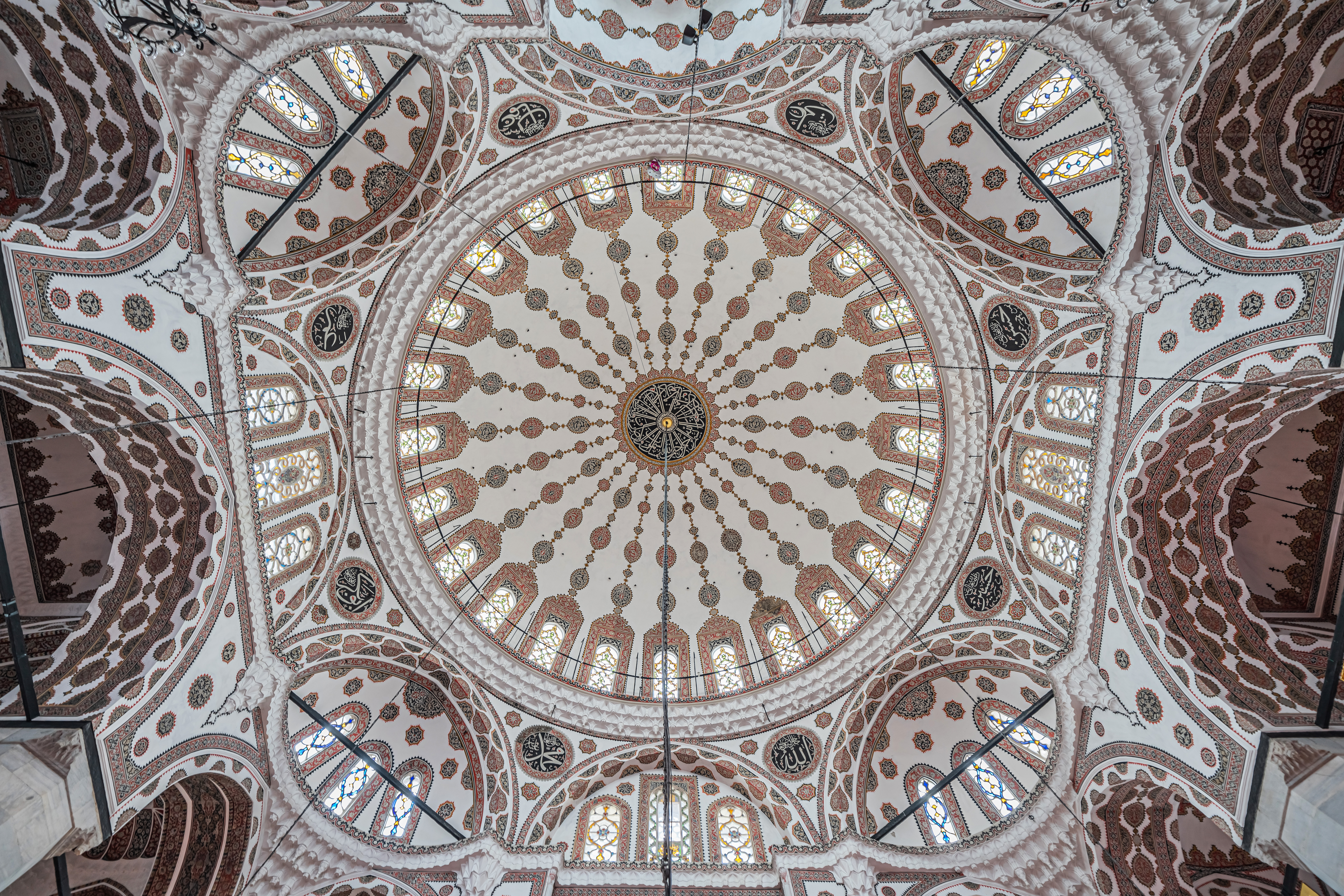
Interior of the dome of the Yeni Valide Mosque in Üsküdar, Istanbul

The Yeni Valide Mosque at Üsküdar aka Valide-e Jadid Mosque (Turkish: Yeni Vâlide Camii, Vâlide-i Cedid Camii), meaning New Mother Mosque, is an 18th-century Ottoman imperial mosque in the Üsküdar district of Istanbul, Turkey. It is located south of Üsküdar İskele Square and Mihrimah Sultan Mosque. This mosque's construction was commissioned by Gülnuş Sultan near the end of Sultanate of Women period of Ottoman rule. It is the last of the many mosques built in Üsküdar by royal Ottoman women during this period. It was constructed under the administration of chief architect Kayserili Mehmed Ağa (d. 1742), though his role in its construction is unclear.

The külliye consists of a mosque, a hünkâr pavilion, an imaret, arasta, sıbyan mektebi, the tomb of Gülnuş Sultan, a courtyard shadirvan, a muvakkithane, external public water fountain, and administrative offices.

== History ==
Construction of the Yeni Valide mosque in Üsküdar began in 1708 and was completed in 1710. The mosque is an architectural example of traditional Ottoman design and religious architecture. The commissioner of the Yeni Valide Mosque was Sultan Ahmed III, (1673–1736), ruler of the Ottoman Empire, who was born in Dobruja, modern-day Bulgaria and Romania. Inspired by Ottoman architecture, the Yeni Valide Mosque took inspiration from the Şehzade Mosque, a similar mosque located in Istanbul, Turkey. Sultan Ahmed III commissioned in honor of his mother Emetullah Râbi'a Gülnûş Sultan. His mother was a prominent figure, second only to her son himself. Construction of the Yeni Valide Mosque was established to not only provide services to the public, but to honor the memory of his mother through the dedication of a place of worship and good deed in her name. She had the power to choose the women allowed to serve the sultan as consorts as well as intervene in administrative affairs. The mosque reflects the political power and patronage that the imperial women had during the Tulip period.

The building is typical of the Classical Ottoman period and of the "Sinan School" of Ottoman religious architecture. It is located in the Üsküdar neighborhood of Istanbul. The main part of the building is square-shaped and covered with a flattened main dome and four half domes. The mosque has two minarets with two balconies each. The mosque served the community and was a landmark in Üsküdar, allowing for a place of worship and rest for people arriving from other parts of the city. Alongside the Yeni Valide Mosque considered as a religious pace and commissioned to demonstrate Sultan Ahmed II's political power, Sultan Ahmed II intended to use the mosque a place of worship, not necessarily to a religion, but rather to honor his mother, Emetullah Rabia Gulnus. Calligraphy inside the mosque is the work of Hezarfen Mehmet Efendi. The calligraphy inscribed quotes verses from the Qur’an, with references to the names of the Prophet Muhammad and Allah. Over the years, the mosque had been updated in order to preserve the stonework as well as the calligraphy.

=== Exterior ===
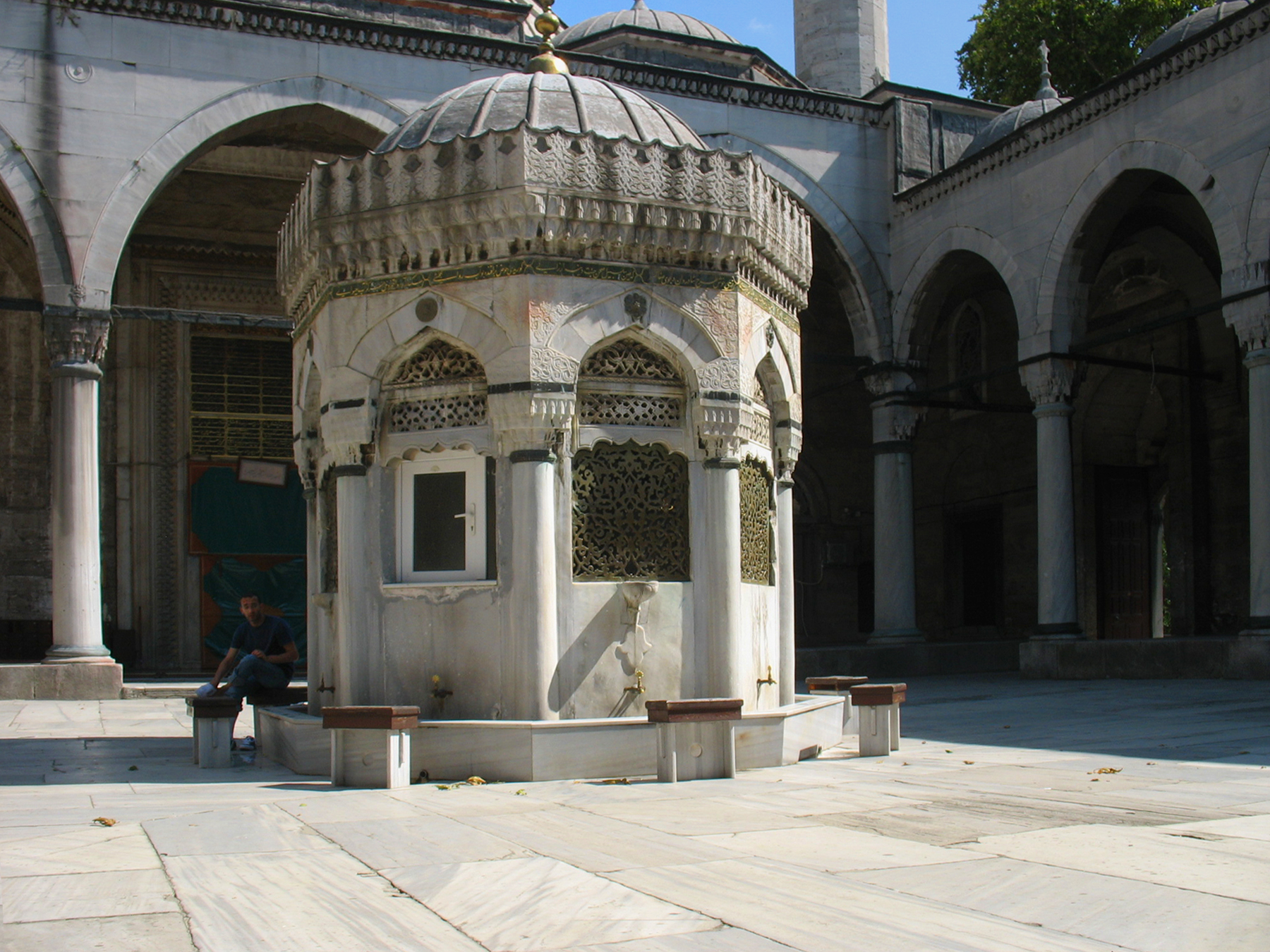
Public fountain in Yeni Valide Mosque Courtyard

The mosque is walled off separating itself from the Üsküdar district, the entrance being a large gateway. Inside of the walls is one of the mosque's most famous aspect, Gülnuş Sultan's tomb, which has a unique bird cage like theme consisting of bronze grilles between columns and pointed arches supporting a lattice dome. This, and the various bird houses located along the facade, point to the Ottoman fondness of animals in their architectural design. It also has a courtyard with a notable fountain at its center with available water for public use. In the courtyard, the mosque has an abundance of different trees from plane to palm, as well as chestnut.

The mosque has an octagonal base with a central dome. Its plan is a variant of that of the Rüstem Pasha Mosque, but variations such as its corner domes give it a more classical character than the Rüstem Pasha Mosque. It is also one of the earliest examples of the 18th-century trend towards domes that were proportionally higher and narrower. The cross vault over the central opening is an innovation first seen in this mosque. Rather than the five domes over the entrance portico – typical for Ottoman mosques – the Yeni Valide employs a cross vault over a central bay and cloister vaults over side bays. The interior decoration consists of stone carvings including muqarnas – intricate stone carvings with floral motifs – and tiles with repetitive floral patterns.

In the northeastern section, there is a public water fountain which was finished in 1709. The fountain is made of marble, with a crowning large palmette arrangement reminiscent of the double-headed eagle motif above the center. This motif represents power, dominance, sovereignty, and sultanate in imperial artwork and heraldry. The space around the motif is filled with floral patterns and at the bottom, there are 9 feather-like arrangements. The use of the double-headed eagle represents Ahmed III's rule and draws attention to the continuity of Ottoman rule.

=== Interior ===
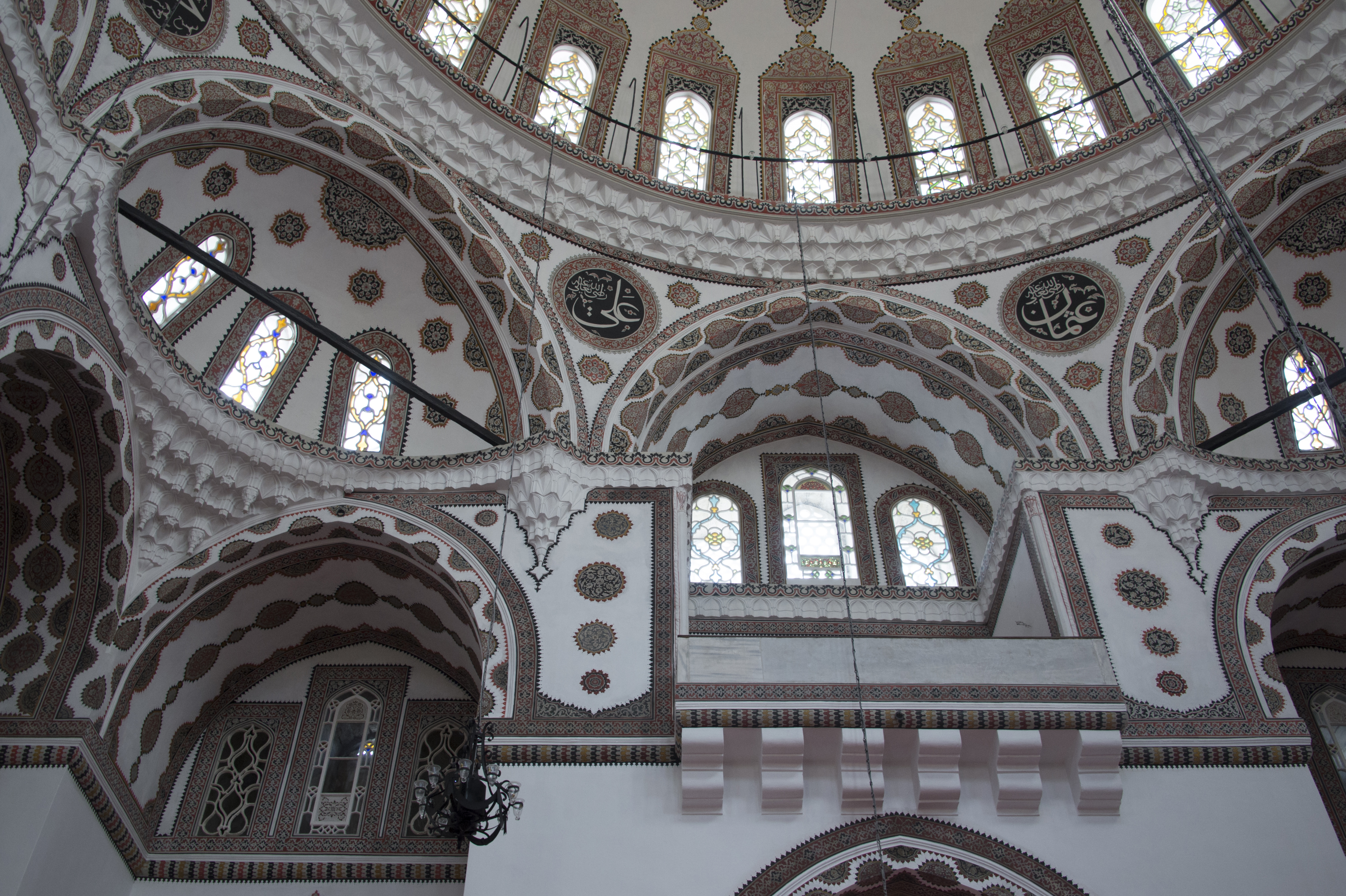
Interior Patterns and Arabic text of Yeni Valide Mosque

Inside of the mosque there are floral patterns and motifs. At the front there is a mihrab, as well as a minbar for the Imam which is necessary in mosques so the Imam can lead and direct the congregants during prayer. On the interior of the domed ceiling there are different Arabic scriptures written, specifically in the Thuluth calligraphy style. The scriptures were produced by Hezarfen Mehmet Efendi.

The windows of the mosque make use of both pointed and curved arches. Those below the domes are pointed, creating the visual effect of pushing the domes upwards. The windows in the domes have rounded arches, which creates the visual effect of the dome pushing downwards on the structure beneath. Both the entryway and the octagonal fountain (shadirvan) in the courtyard make liberal use of very detailed stone carvings and the tomb of Gülnûş features an open top and intricate metal latticework. The primary school is located above the north gate to the mosque complex.

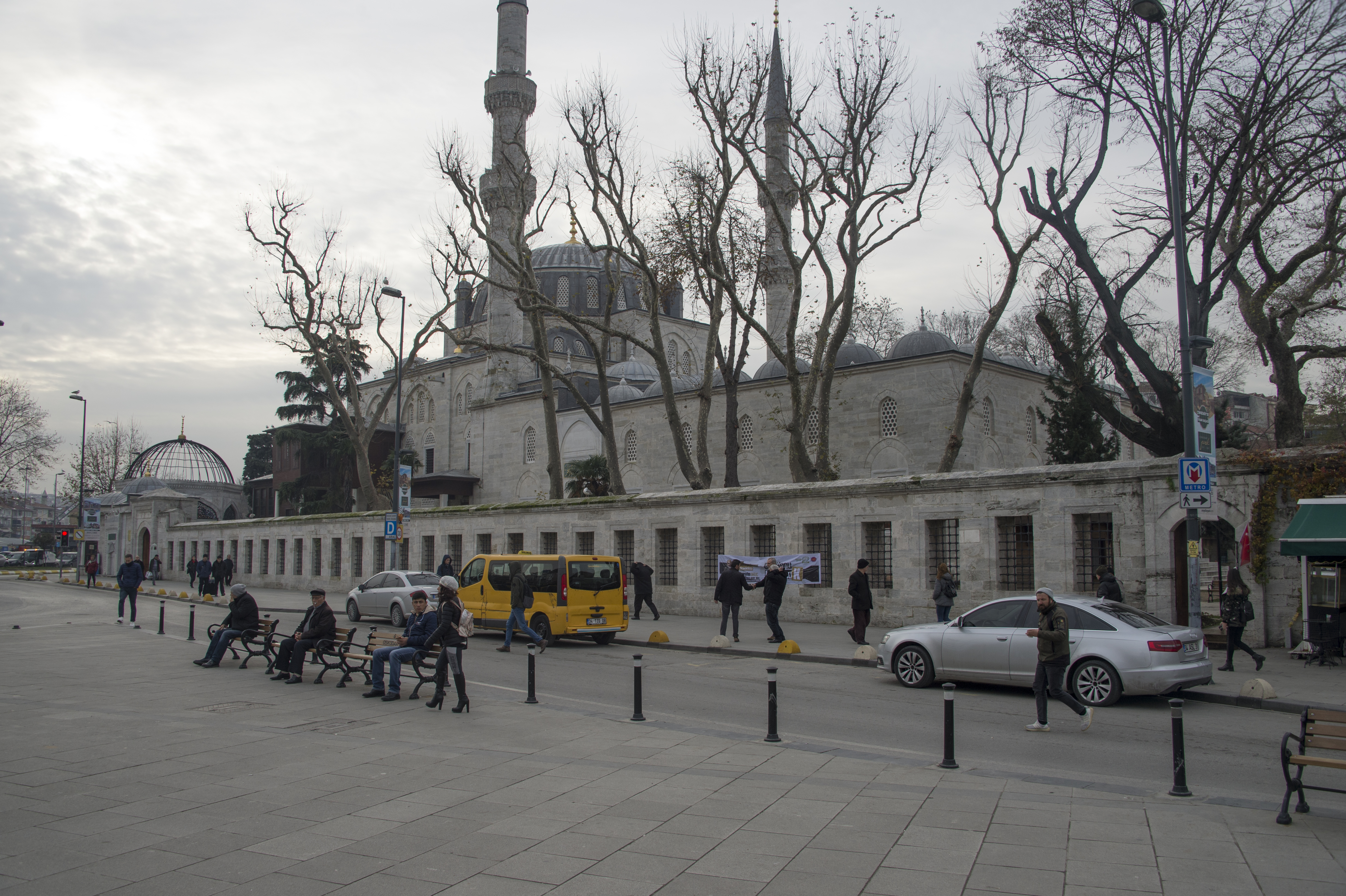
Yeni Valide Mosque from nearby road

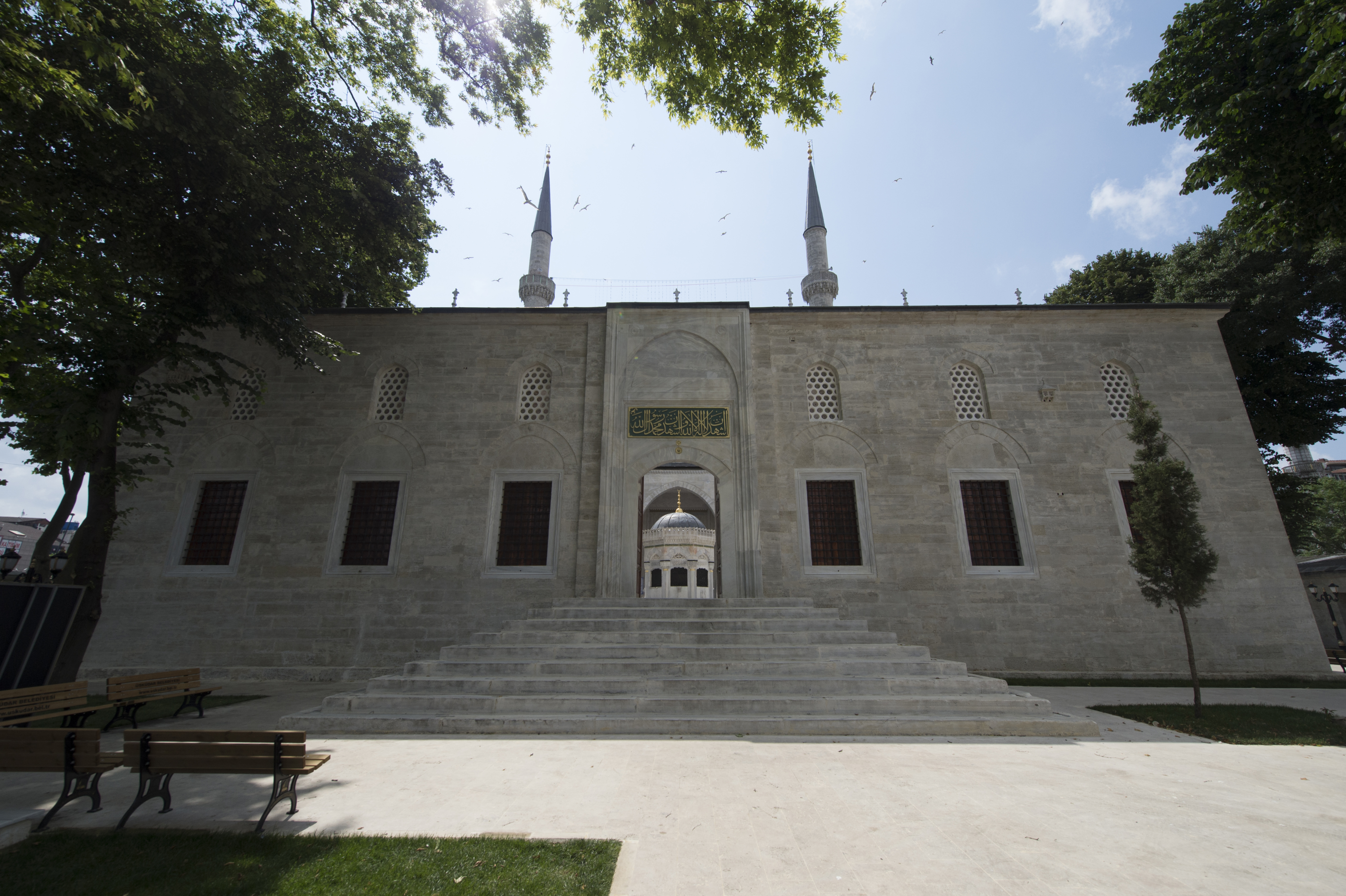
Yeni Valide Camii front from garden

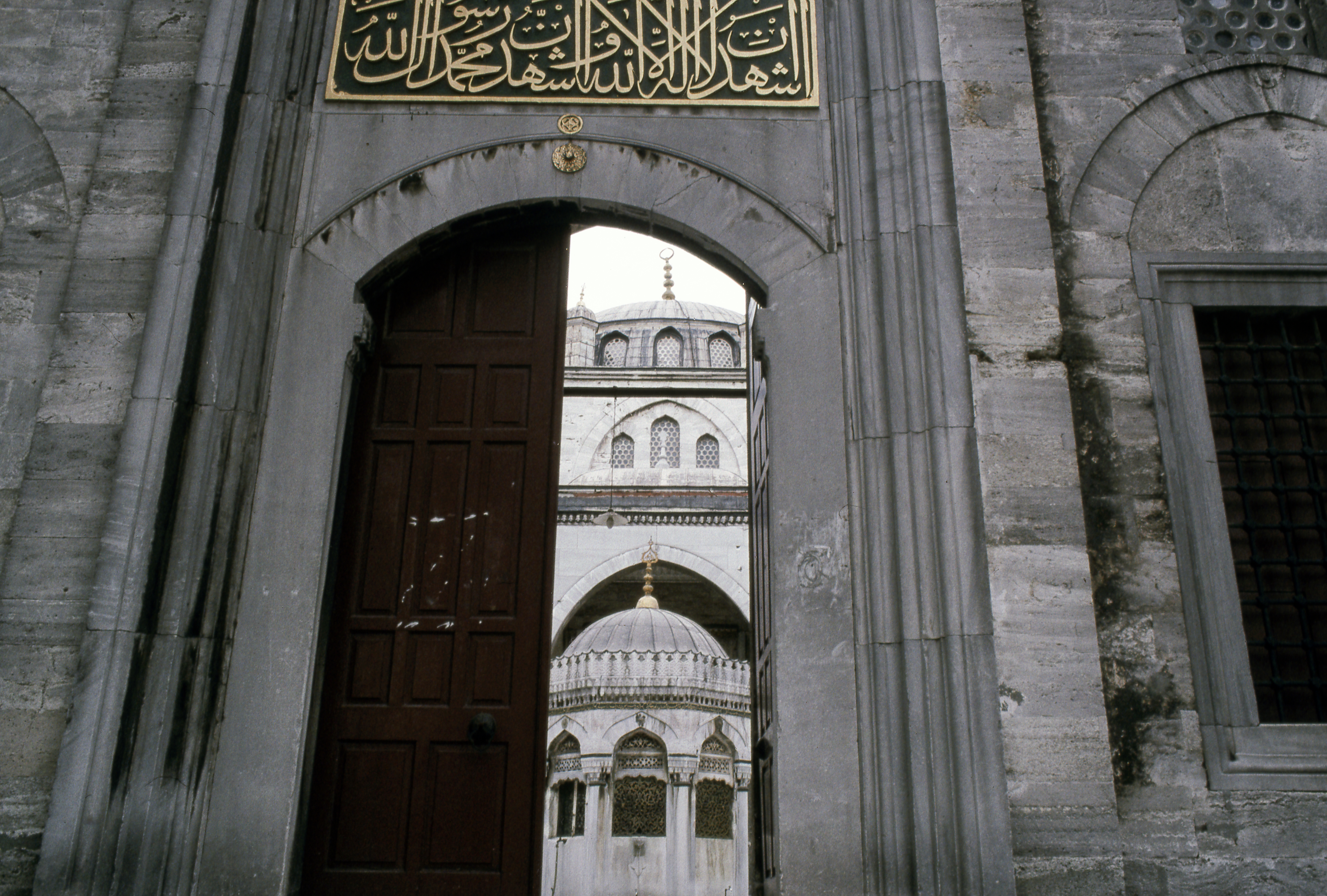
Yeni Valide Camii entrance to courtyard

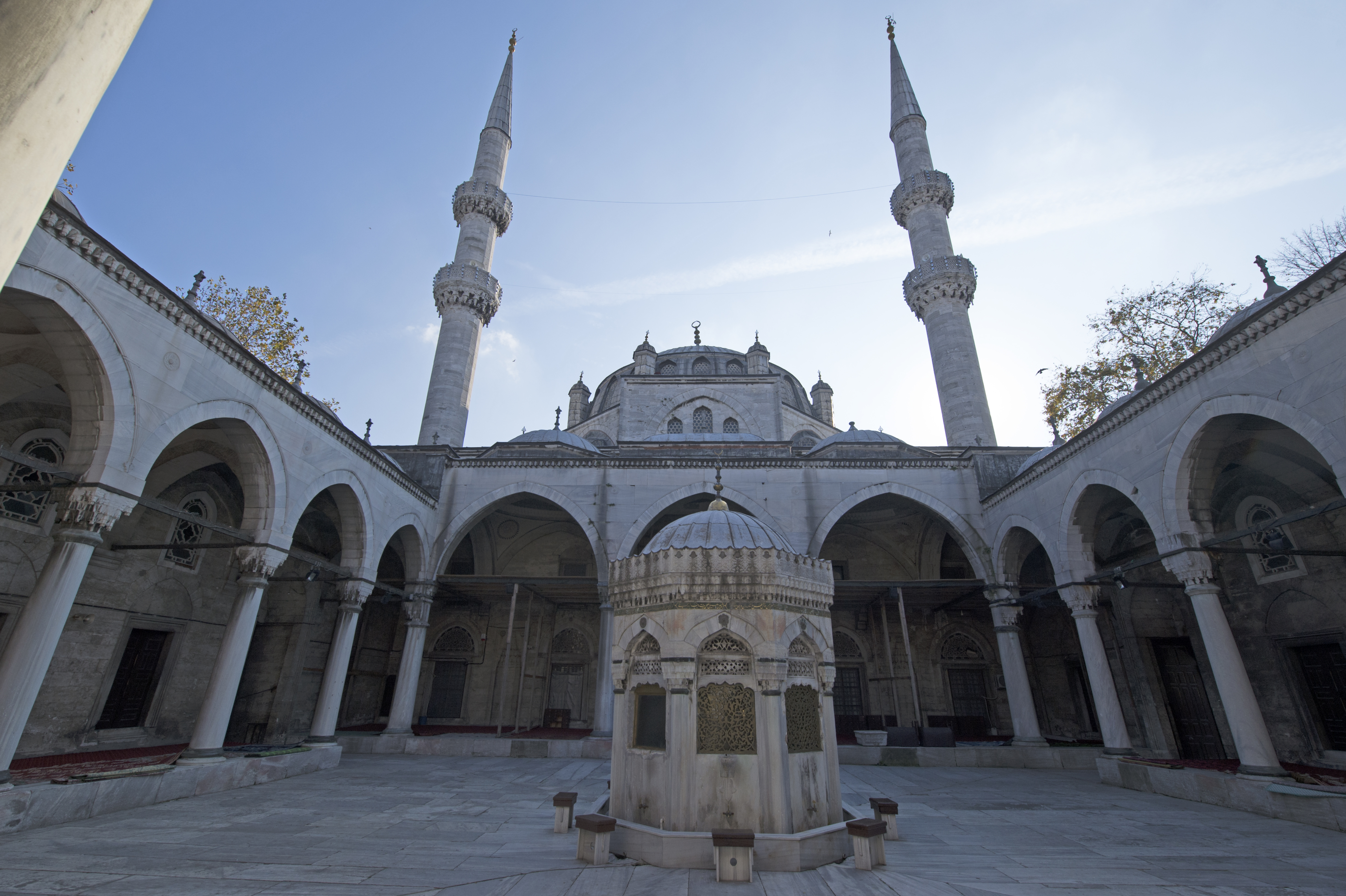
Yeni Valide Camii courtyard

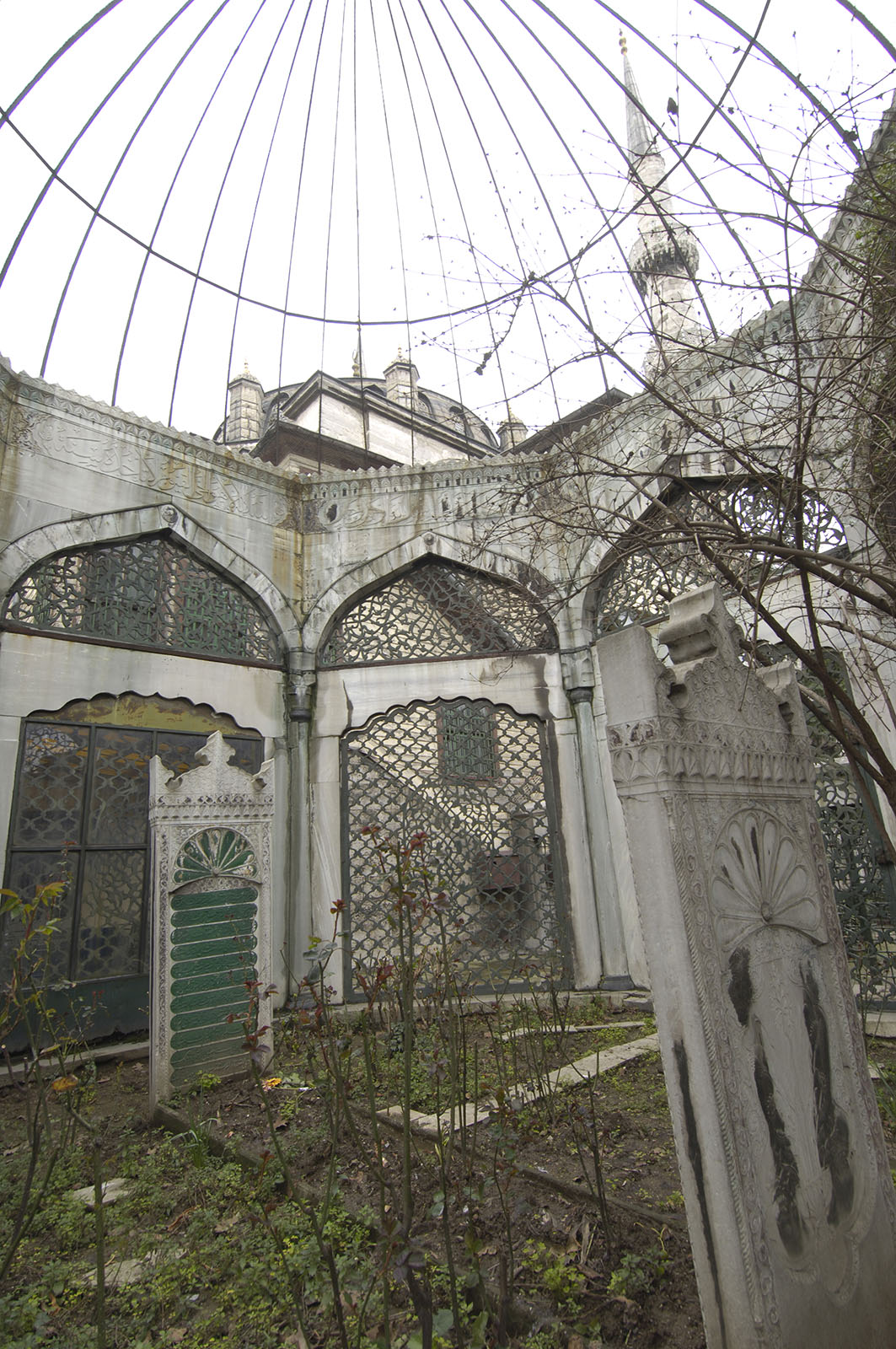
Yeni Valide Camii open air tomb of Emetullah Râbi'a Gülnûş Sultan

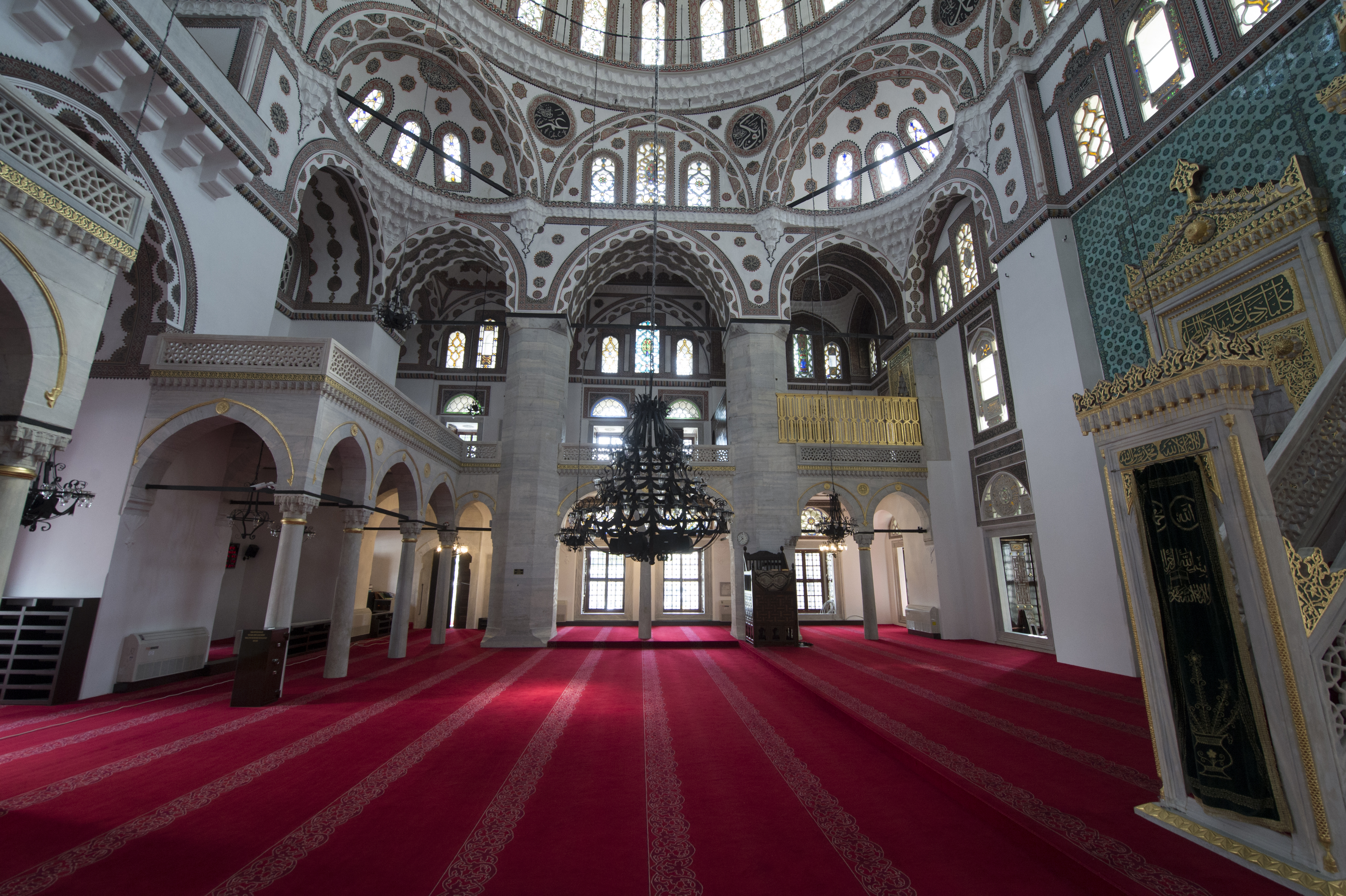
Yeni Valide Camii interior

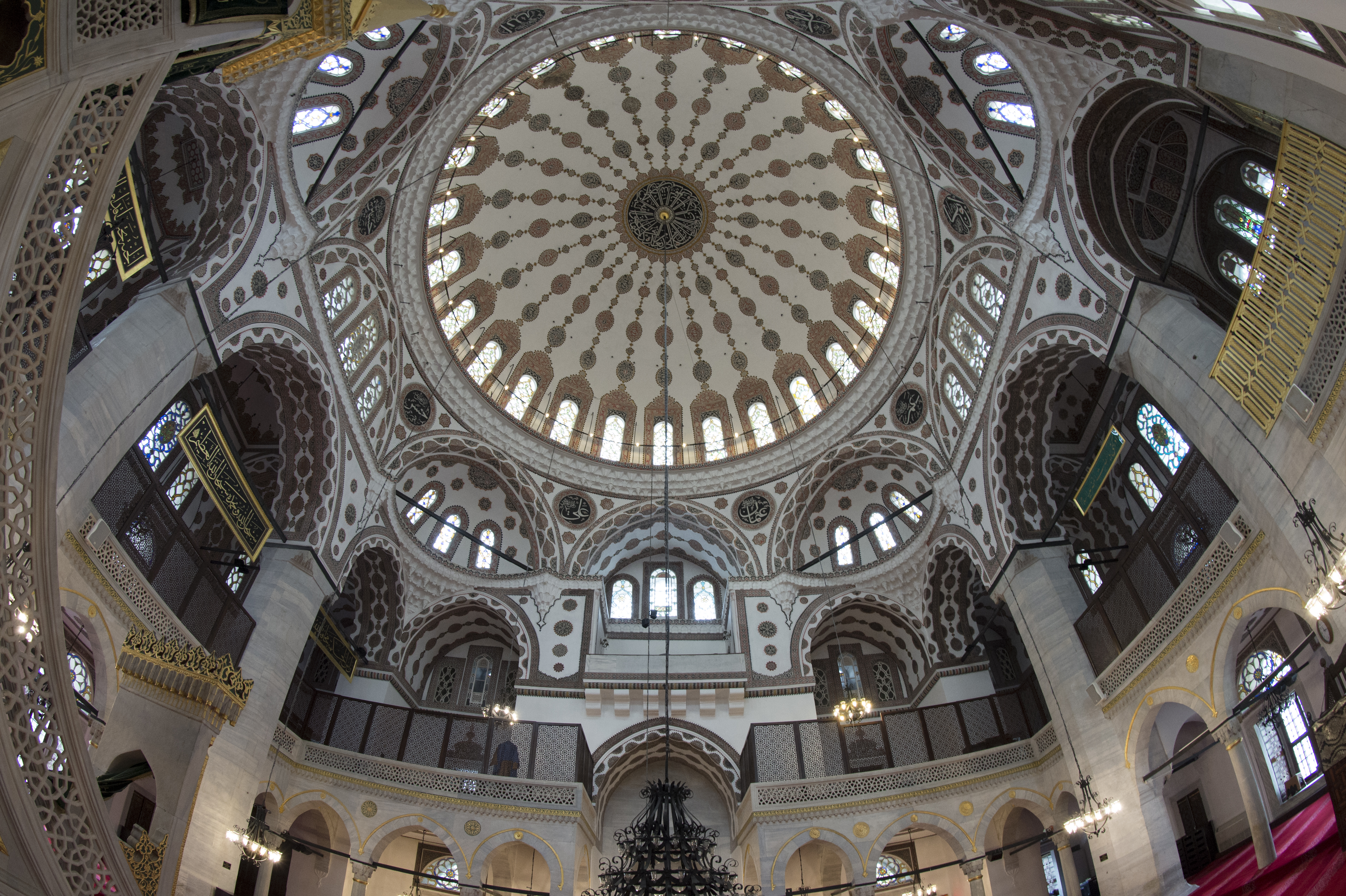
Yeni Valide Camii view ceiling

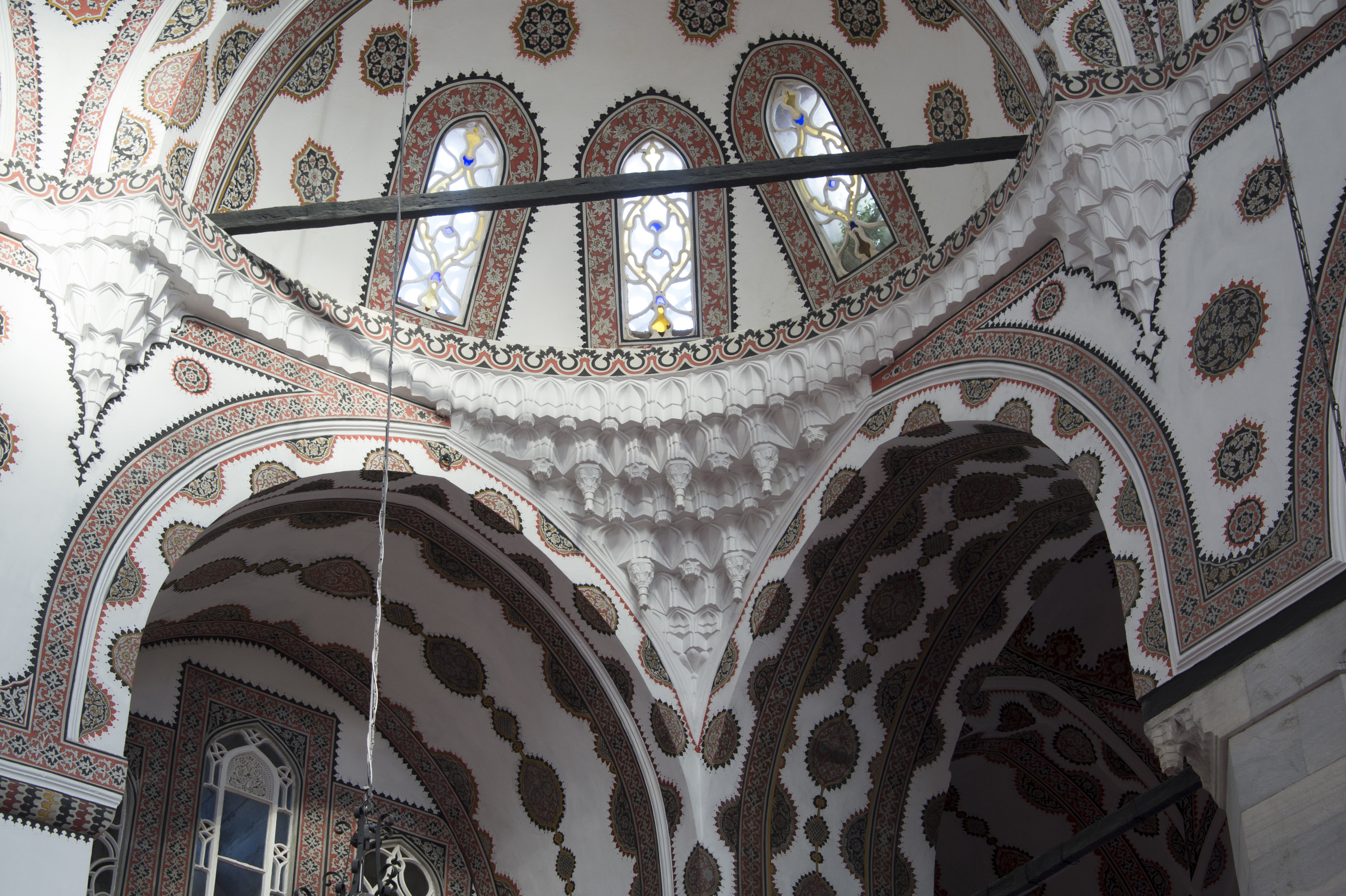
Yeni Valide Camii domes detail

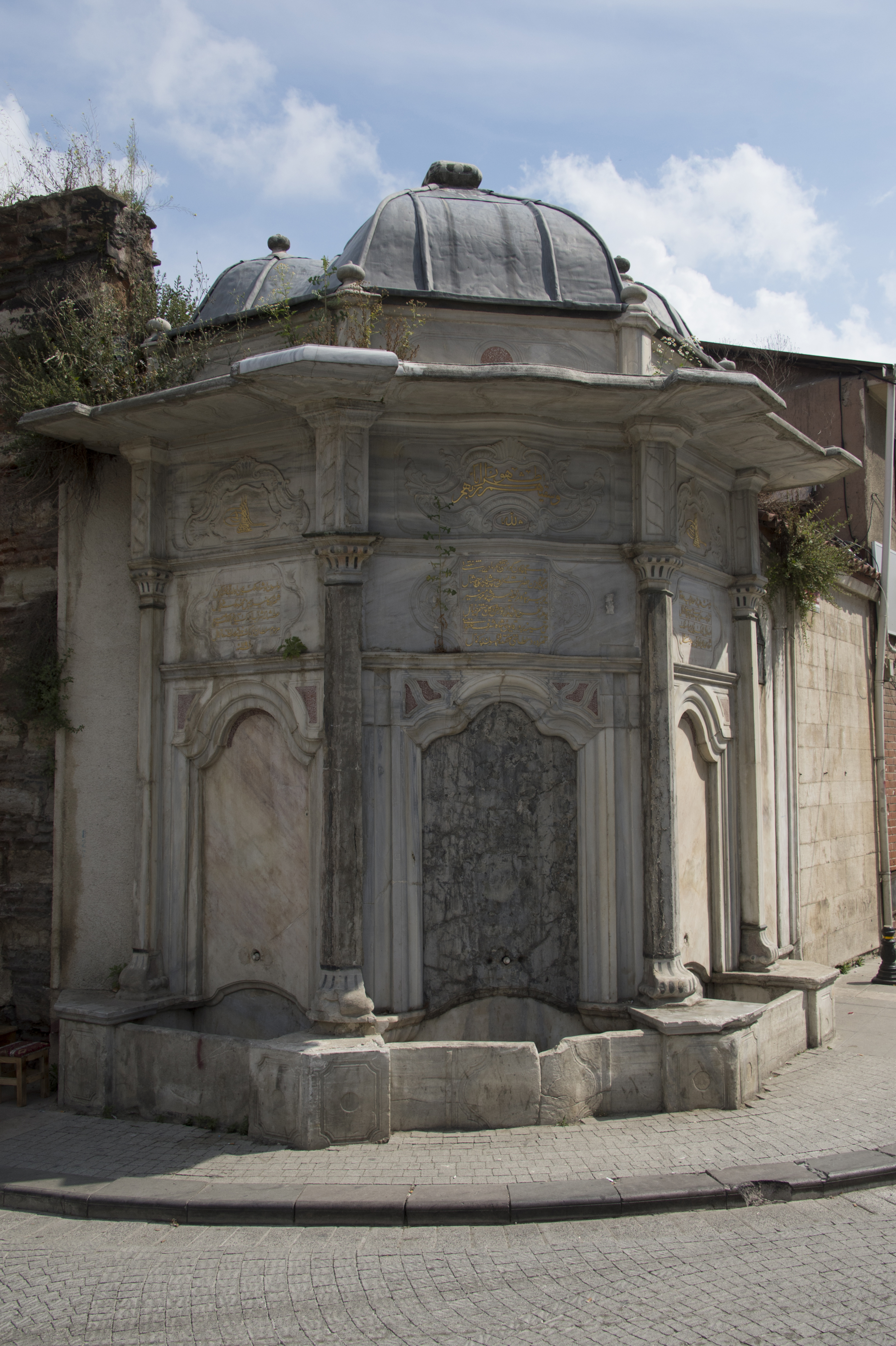
Yeni Valide Camii sebil

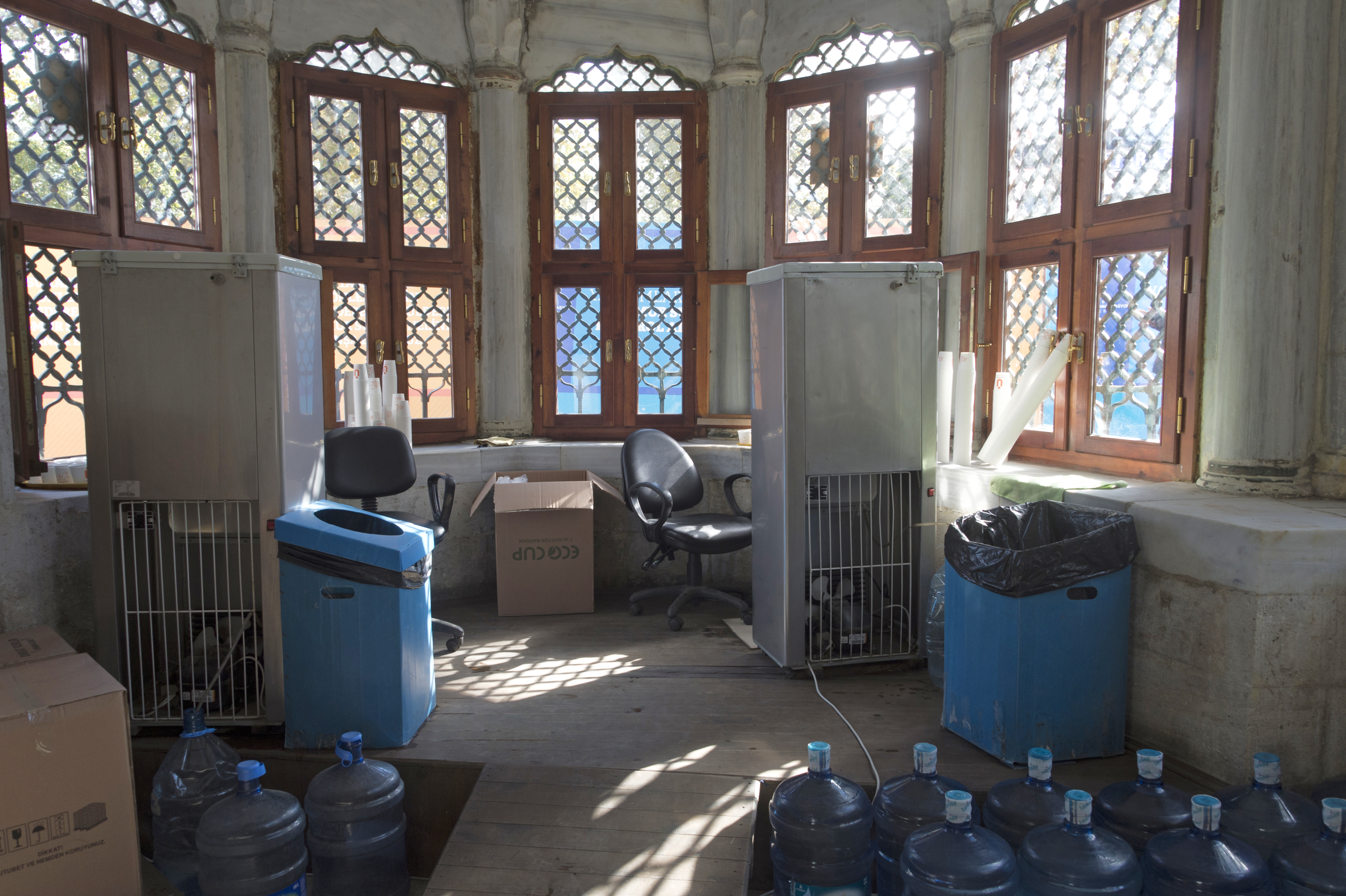
Yeni Valide Camii inside sebil

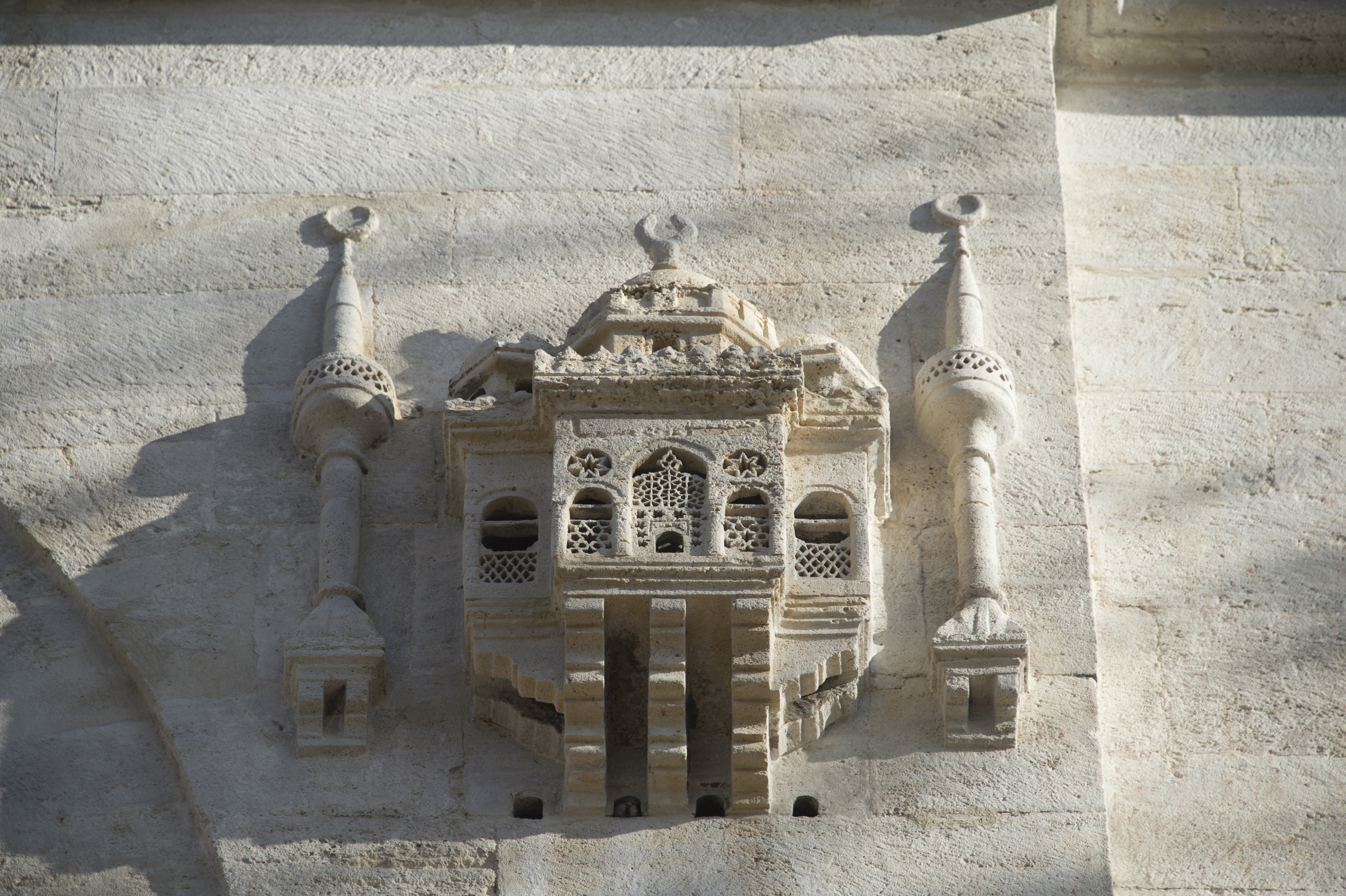
Yeni Valide Camii bird house

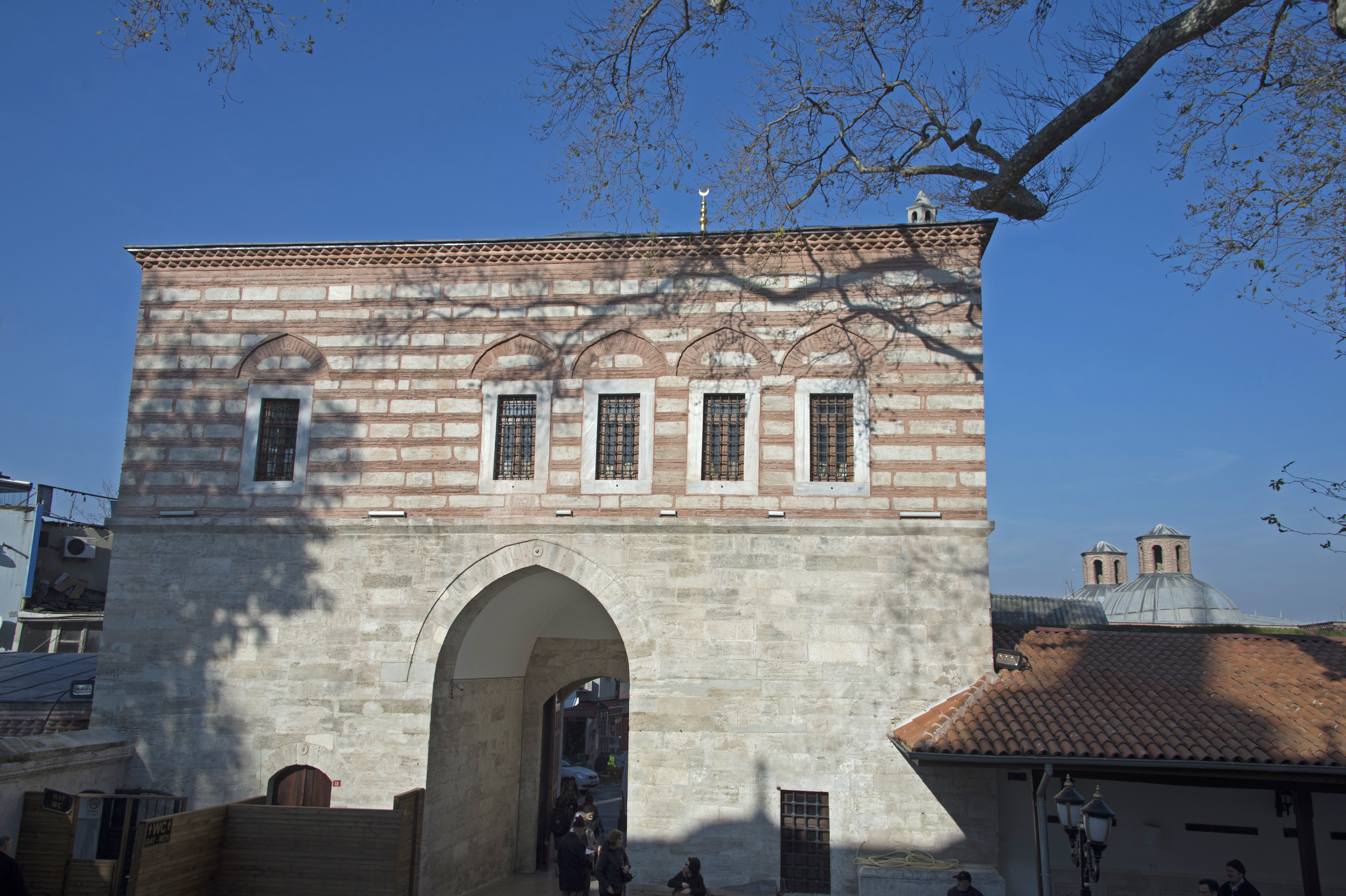
Yeni Valide Mosque main gate

== See also ==
- Mihrimah Sultan Mosque
- Şemsi Pasha Mosque
- Atik Valide Mosque
- Ottoman architecture
- Kulliyye
