= Old Palace =

Old Palace may refer to:

- Old Palace, Canterbury
- Old Palace, Berlin
- Eski Saray, Istanbul
- Old Palace, Oxford
- The Old Palace, Worcester
- Old Palace, York
- Purani Haveli (lit. 'Old Palace'), royal palace in Telangana, India
- Purani Haveli (film), a 1989 Indian Hindi-language horror film

== See also ==
- Croydon Palace, London, UK
- Palazzo Vecchio at the Lazzaretto of Manoel Island, Gżira, Malta
- Old Royal Palace, Athens, Greece
- Palazzo Vecchio, Florence, Italy
- Stari dvor, Serbia
