= Silahdar Findiklili Mehmed Agha =

Ottoman official and historian (1658-c.1727)

Silahdar Fındıklılı Mehmed Ağa
- Born: 7 December 1658; Constantinople, Ottoman Empire (present day Istanbul, Turkey)
- Died: c. 1726–27 (aged 68–69); Istanbul, Ottoman Empire
- Burial place: Ayazpaşa Cemetery, Taksim Square, Istanbul, Turkey

Silahdar Fındıklılı Mehmed Ağa (7 December 1658– c. 1726–27) was an Ottoman historian, serving under sultans Mehmed IV, Suleiman II, Ahmed II, Mustafa II and Ahmed III.

== Early life ==
Silahdar Fındıklılı Mehmed Ağa was born on 7 December 1658 in the district of Fındıklı in Galata, Mehmed Ağa, who entered the palace at a young age, was brought up under the patronage of Baş Musahib Şahin Ağa at the time. He was included in Hasbahçe gardeners on 9 February 1674 and then as page in the privy chamber. He rose to higher positions in a short time, serving under sultan Mehmed IV.

== Campaigns ==
Mehmed Ağa personally participated in the Vienna Expedition in 1683 and expressed the troubles that were taken after he left the army with his army. In 1688, Witnessing Mehmed IV's dismissal and rebellion of janissaries, Mehmed Ağa, the new sultan. He was in his service at the time of S. He was found near the sultan because of his work and recorded the events with great care and detail. With this rivals, ulema masters, were admitted to the presence of the sultan in the Bağdad Mansion in Hasbahçe and expressed their discomfort about İsmail Pasha.

== Works ==
As stated briefly above, Silahdar Mehmed Ağa continued to write his work from the place where his Fezleke left because of his admiration to Katib Çelebi. Silahdar Findiklili Mehmed Agha wrote historical chronicles such as "Zeyl-i Fezleke" ("Postscript to the Fezleke," the Fezleke being an earlier work by the historian Kâtip Çelebi), which is today commonly known as Silahdar Tarihi (The History of Sword-Bearer).

=== ZeyliFelekze ===
Zeyl-i Fezleke has seven detected copies. Three of them are in various libraries in Istanbul, one in the Manisa General Library and one in Vienna.In addition, it is not known where the copy of Halis Efendi used by Ahmet Refik Bey in the publication of a work in the Turkish Historical Society Library. A second volume of his work was entitled Nusretname (The Book of Victories). These together recorded the events which occurred prior to and during his lifetime. They present both the events in Constantinople (such as the fire of 1660 which destroyed most of the city) but also his experience during the campaigns of Kara Mustafa Pasha and the battle of Vienna.

As we mentioned above in the resources section, Silahdar wrote the previous transfer while writing his work by referring to the resources written earlier. However, he did not transfer the information contained in these works as they were, and compared the resources with each other and completed the deficiencies from other sources. Thus, it can easily be said that Zeyl-i Fezleke contains more detailed information than any of these sources.

For his own period, although he was involved in the events, he did not hesitate to use other sources from time to time and wrote the period he lived with his own observations in a very detailed way. The work of Silahdar is of particular importance for the siege of Vienna and beyond, since it was personally involved in this expedition, based on their own observations and experiences.

=== Nusretnâme ===
In Nusretname who writes about, Mustafa II's Austrian expeditions, Zenta Disaster, Karlofça Treaty, Edirne Foundation and the actions of the navy are included in this section. In the second part, it deals with the events between 1704 and 1721. The most important of these are: Baltacı Mehmed Pasha's Russian expedition, Purut Treaty and Khanate struggles in Crimea. He is more concise because he wrote this part after leaving the palace. The author evaluated what he heard more here.

Silahdar Mehmed Ağa wrote the events in chronological order, year by year, in both of his works. In fact, giving the Gregorian dates in some cases when it deems necessary is an indication of the importance given to date determination.

== Death ==
Silahdar Findklili Mehmed Agha probably died in 1726–27. The information given by the sources about the date of death and the place of his grave is different. Mehmed Ağa, who died at the age of seventy, was buried in Ayazpaşa Cemetery in Taksim.

== Legacy ==
Mehmed Ağa, who emphasized the historian aspect with the words "Muharrir-i vekāyi'-i hakīr müverrih Mehmed kemterleri" , as he mentioned in his life section, he has followed the state and sultanate news very closely as he had important services in the palace, and many events during his civil service life It was found inside. After 1703 it was part of the years when it was away from the palace service, and this part was mostly written by writing what they heard.

When compared with the historical works of the same period, it is seen that the events in Zeyl-i Fezleke were more detailed than others and that many issues not found in other dates were also found in the history of Silahdar. In addition, due to the fact that Silahdar Mehmed Ağa is someone who came from the palace bureaucracy and took part in the events beside the sultan himself, both his developments in the palace were comprehensively addressed and many details about the private world of the sultan were included.

Although it is an important source, both Zeyl-i Fezleke and Nusretnâme did not attract the attention of historians for a long time. In this, Nusretname can be said that Râşid Târihi, which gave the same period events as he could not present to Mustafa, had a great role in the early years. Historians such as Vak'anüvis Râşid Mehmed, Örfî Mahmud Ağa, Ahmed Câvid and Ahmed Resmî Efendi used the work of Silahdar Mehmed Ağa as a source. Although Râşid benefited from Nusretname especially for the events between 1695 and 1703, he did not give the name of his source. It was simplified and this publication contains jumps and inaccuracies. A doctoral study was carried out by Mehmet Topal on the work.

== Sources ==
- Türkal, Merve (2013). Silahdar Findiklili Mehmed Ağa'nin Hayati ve eserleri (1658 / 1726–27).
- Topal, Mehmet (2001). Silahdar Findiklili Mehmed Agha Nusretnâme: Tahlil ve Metin (1106–1133/1695–1721).
