= Fatma Emetullah Sultan (daughter of Mehmed IV) =

Ottoman princess

- Died: 29 May 1700; Constantinople, Ottoman Empire
- Burial: Mausoleum of Turhan Sultan, New Mosque, Eminönü, Constantinople
- Spouse: Çerkes Ibrahim Pasha (m. 1695; died 1697) Topal Yusuf Pasha (m. 1697; died 1700)
- Issue: First marriage Rukiye Hanimsultan; Second marriage Safiye Hanimsultan
- Dynasty: Ottoman
- Father: Mehmed IV
- Mother: Gülnuş Sultan
- Religion: Sunni Islam

Fatma Emetullah Sultan (Ottoman Turkish: فاطمه امت الله سلطان; died 29 May 1700) was an Ottoman princess, the daughter of Mehmed IV and Gülnuş Sultan. She was a sister of Sultans Mustafa II and Ahmed III.

== Early life ==
She was born to Mehmed IV and his favourite consort Gülnuş Sultan. Her second name was given in honour of her mother. She was the sixth and last child of her parents and their fourth daughter.

== Marriages ==
Her brother, Mustafa II, married her to Tırnakçı Çerkes Ibrahim Pasha in September 1695, whom he had first granted the rank of deputy of Silistre, and whom he later had executed in September 1697. They had a daughter.

She subsequently married Topal Yusuf Paşa in 1697. They had a daughter.

== Death ==
Fatma Sultan died on 29 May 1700, from plague, tuberculosis, or, according to other sources, postpartum complications. Her funeral procession was joined by her husband and several statesmen. She was buried next to her father in the mausoleum of her grandmother Turhan Sultan in New Mosque.

== Issue ==
By her first marriage, Fatma had a daughter:

- Rukiye Hanımsultan (1696–1720), who married Sirke Osman Pasha who, after her death, married her cousin Emetullah Sultan in August 1720.

By her second marriage, Fatma had a second daughter:

- Safiye Hanımsultan (1697/1700–1711).

== See also ==
- List of Ottoman princesses
