= Ahmed II =

Sultan of the Ottoman Empire from 1691 to 1695

- Custodian of the Two Holy Mosques
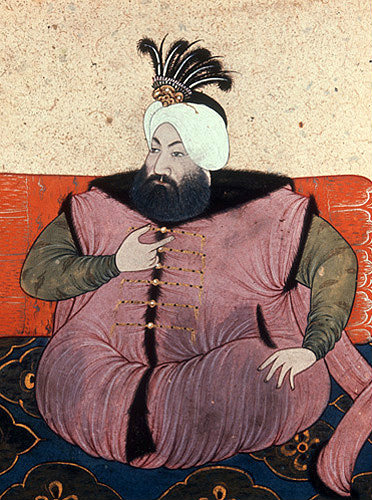
- Portrait of Ahmed II from the Kebir Musavver Silsilenâme, by Abdulcelil Levni, c. 1710–20

Sultan of the Ottoman Empire (Padishah)
- Reign: 22 June 1691 – 6 February 1695
- Predecessor: Suleiman II
- Successor: Mustafa II

Ottoman caliph (Amir al-Mu'minin)
- Predecessor: Suleiman II
- Successor: Mustafa II
- Born: 25 February 1643 or 1 August 1642; Constantinople, Ottoman Empire
- Died: 6 February 1695 (aged 51); Edirne, Ottoman Empire
- Burial: Süleymaniye Mosque, Istanbul, Turkey
- Consort: Rabia Sultan; Şayeste Hatun
- Issue: Hatice Sultan; Şehzade Ibrahim; Şehzade Selim; Asiye Sultan; Atike Sultan
Names
- Ahmed bin Ibrahim
- Dynasty: Ottoman
- Father: Ibrahim
- Mother: Muazzez Sultan
- Religion: Sunni Islam
- Tughra

Ahmed II (Ottoman Turkish: احمد ثانی, romanized: Aḥmed-i sānī; Turkish: II. Ahmed; 25 February 1643 or 1 August 1642 – 6 February 1695) was the sultan of the Ottoman Empire from 1691 to 1695.

== Early life ==
Ahmed II was born on 25 February 1643 or 1 August 1642, the son of Sultan Ibrahim and Muazzez Sultan. On 21 October 1649, Ahmed, along with his brothers Mehmed and Suleiman was circumcised. During the reigns of his older brothers, Ahmed was imprisoned in Kafes, and he stayed there almost 43 years.

== Reign ==
During his reign, Ahmed II devoted his attention to wars against the Habsburgs and the governmental, foreign policy, and economic issues that related to it. Of primary importance was the creation of a permanent tax farm system (malikâne). Following the recovery of Belgrade under his predecessor, Suleiman II, the military frontier reached a rough stalemate on the Danube, with the Habsburgs no longer able to advance south of it, and the Ottomans attempting, ultimately unsuccessfully, to regain the initiative north of it.

Among the most important features of Ahmed's reign was his reliance on Köprülüzade Fazıl Mustafa Pasha. Ahmed II confirmed Fazıl Mustafa Pasha as his grand vizier after he took the throne. Fazıl Mustafa Pasha was from the Köprülü family of grand viziers, who had produced many capable administrators and military officials for the Turkish court. Following his father, Köprülü Mehmed Pasha, (grand vizier, 1656–61), Mustafa ordered dozens of the previous government's state officials fired or executed on charges of corruption. They were replaced with men loyal to Mustafa. He made significant adjustments in the function of the tax system to account for how recent wars impacted taxpayer's resources. He began the process of drafting tribesmen in Anatolia and the Balkans in order to increase possible levies of conscripts. In October 1690, Fazıl Mustafa Pasha recaptured Belgrade, a key fortress at the meeting point of the Danube and Sava rivers, which the Ottoman had held since 1521, but had been conquered by Habsburg forces after the Siege of Belgrade.

The victory at Belgrade was a significant victory and raised Ottoman hopes of reversing the defeats they suffered in the 1680's including the capture of Hungary and Transylvania, an Ottoman vassal-state ruled by Hungarian princes loyal to the Ottomans. The success were not lasting. On 19 August 1691, Fazıl Mustafa Pasha suffered a devastating defeat at the Battle of Slankamen at the hands of Louis William, the Habsburg commander in chief in Hungary, nicknamed “Türkenlouis” (Louis the Turk) for his victories against the Ottomans. In the vigorous battle that followed, the Ottomans suffered heavily. 20,000 men, including the grand vizier were lost. With that loss, the sultan lost the last member of the Köprülü family, who had been instrumental in Ottoman success for half a century.

Further defeats were to follow under Fazıl Mustafa Pasha's successors. The Habsburgs conquered Oradea, the local Ottoman governor's (beylerbeyi) seat in June 1692. A 1694 effort to retake the city failed. On 12 January 1695, they were forced to surrender Gyula, a fortress and the center of an Ottoman sanjak (subprovince) since 1566. This meant that only territory east of the River Tisza and to the south of the river Maros, with its center at Timișoara, was still in the possession of the Ottomans. Ahmed II died in Edirne Palace less than a month later on February 6, 1695.

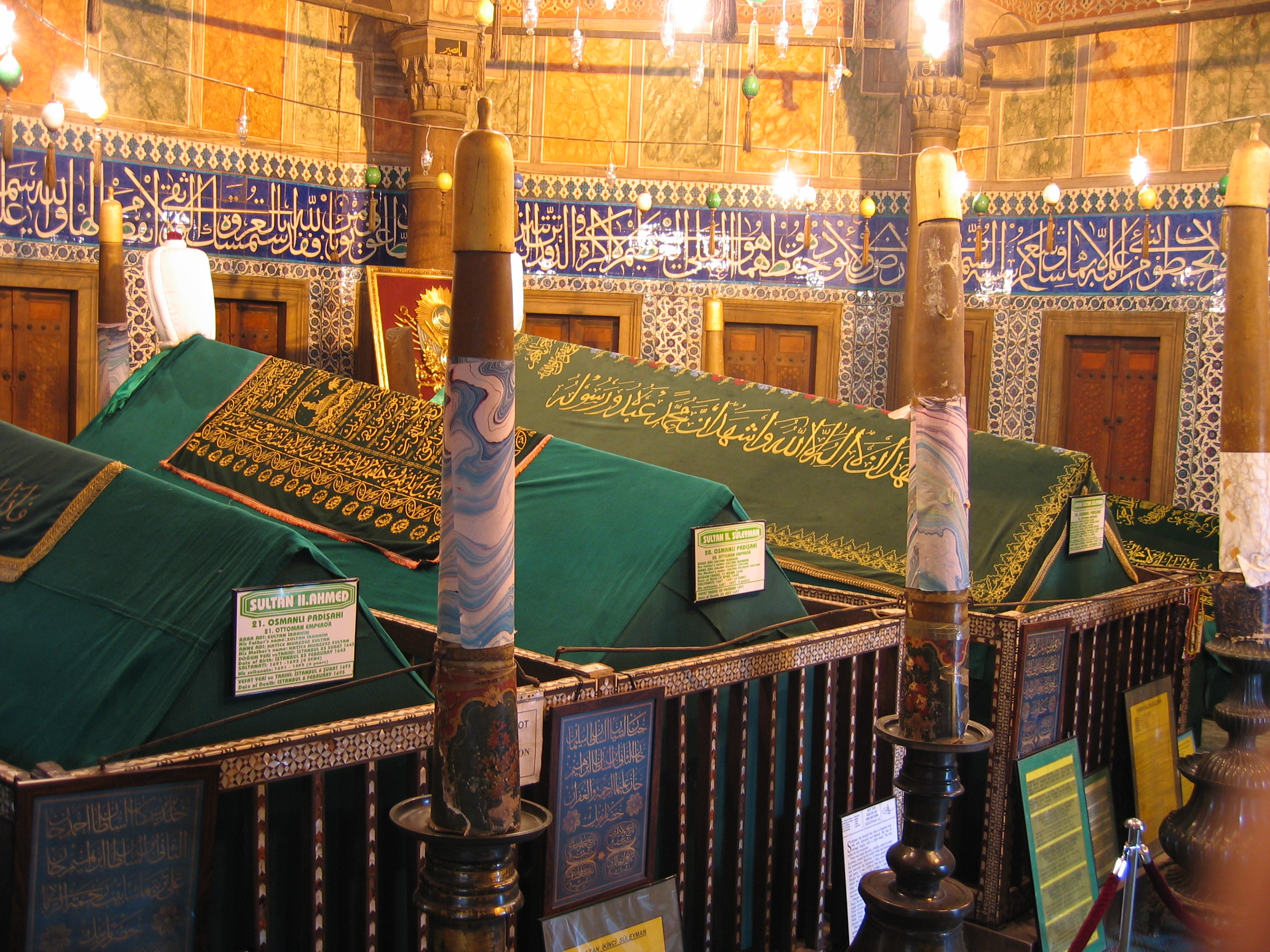
The mausoleum of Ahmed II is located inside the türbe of Suleiman the Magnificent. (In the above picture, his tomb is seen side by side with Suleiman II and Suleiman the Magnificent).

== Family ==
=== Consorts ===
Ahmed II had two known consorts:

- Rabia Sultan (died Eski Palace, Istanbul, 14 January 1712, buried in Suleiman I Mausoleum, Süleymaniye Mosque). Ahmed II's most beloved consort and the last haseki sultan of the Ottoman Empire;
- Şayeste Hatun (died in 1710). Second concubine of Ahmed II, perhaps mother of his other daughters.

=== Sons ===
Ahmed II had two sons:

- Şehzade Ibrahim (Edirne Palace, Edirne, 7 October 1692 – Topkapı Palace, Istanbul, 4 May 1714, buried in Mustafa I Mausoleum, Hagia Sophia), with Rabia Sultan, Selim's twin, became crown prince on 22 August 1703 until his death;
- Şehzade Selim (Edirne Palace, Edirne, 7 October 1692 – Edirne Palace, Edirne, 25 May 1693, buried in Sultan Mustafa Mausoleum, Hagia Sophia), with Rabia Sultan, he was Ibrahim's twin.

=== Daughters ===
Ahmed II had three daughters:

- Hatice Sultan (c. 1692 – c. 1694), probably with Şayeste Hatun. Died in infancy.
- Asiye Sultan (Edirne Palace, Edirne, 24 August 1694 – Eski Palace, Bayezid, Istanbul, 9 December 1695, buried in Suleiman I Mausoleum, Süleymaniye Mosque), with Rabia Sultan;
- Atike Sultan (born 21 October 1694), probably with Şayeste Hatun. Died in infancy.

In addition to his daughters, Ahmed II was deeply attached to his niece Ümmügülsüm Sultan, daughter of his half-brother Mehmed IV, so much so that he treated her as if she were his own daughter.

Ahmed II House of Osman Born: 25 February 1643 Died: 6 February 1695
Regnal titles
Preceded by Suleiman II	Sultan of the Ottoman Empire; 22 June 1691 – 6 February 1695	Succeeded by Mustafa II
Sunni Islam titles
Preceded by Suleiman II	Caliph of the Ottoman Caliphate; 22 June 1691 – 6 February 1695	Succeeded by Mustafa II
