= Hayranidil Kadın =

Consort of Ottoman Sultan Abdülaziz

- Born: 2 November 1846
- Died: 26 November 1898 (aged 52); Feriye Palace, Ortaköy, Constantinople, Ottoman Empire (present day Istanbul, Turkey)
- Burial: Sultan Mahmud II Mausoleum, Çemberlitaş, Fatih, Istanbul
- Spouse: Abdulaziz (m. 1865; died 1876)
- Issue: Nazime Sultan; Abdulmejid II
Names
- Turkish: Hayranidil Kadın; Ottoman Turkish: خیران دل قادین
- House: Ottoman (by marriage)
- Religion: Sunni Islam

Hayranidil Kadın (Ottoman Turkish: خیران دل قادین, romanized: 4; 2 November 1846 – 26 November 1898) was a consort of Sultan Abdulaziz of the Ottoman Empire, and the mother of the last Ottoman Caliph Abdulmejid II.

== Life ==
Of Abkhazian origin, Hayranıdil Kadın was born on 2 November 1846. She was celebrated as the most beautiful woman of the imperial household. The lack of information about her past and her family suggests that she was of humble or even slave origins: in fact, despite slavery had been abolished in the Ottoman Empire, Pertevniyal Sultan, mother of Abdülaziz, continued to select Caucasian slaves for the harem of her son.

She married Abdulaziz on 21 September 1865 in the Dolmabahçe Palace. She was given the title of "Third Kadın" and in 1875 of "Second Kadın". On 25 February 1867, she gave birth to her first child, a daughter, Nazime Sultan. One year later, on 29 May 1868, she gave birth to her second child, a son, Şehzade Abdulmejid (future Caliph Abdulmejid II) in the Beylerbeyi Palace.

Abdulaziz was deposed by his ministers on 30 May 1876, and his nephew Murad V became the Sultan. He was transferred to Feriye Palace the next day. Hayranıdil, and other women of Abdulaziz's entourage didn't want to leave the Dolmabahçe Palace. So they were grabbed by hand and were sent out to the Feriye Palace. In the process, they were searched from head to toe and everything of value was taken from them. On 4 June 1876, Abdulaziz died under mysterious circumstances. In 1876 the new sultan, Abdulhamid II, freed Abdülaziz's consort and allowed Hayranidil to live in Ortaköy Palace.

== Death ==
Hayranıdil Kadın died on 26 November 1898 in the Feriye Palace, Ortaköy at the age of fifty-two, and was buried in the mausoleum of Sultan Mahmud II, located at Divan Yolu street, Istanbul.

== Issue ==
Name	Birth	Death	Notes
Nazime Sultan	25 February 1867	9 November 1947	married once without issue
Abdulmejid II	29 May 1868	23 August 1944	Last Caliph of the Ottoman Empire

== See also ==
- Kadın (title)
- Ottoman dynasty
- Ottoman family tree
- List of consorts of the Ottoman Sultans

== Sources ==
- Brookes, Douglas Scott (2010). The Concubine, the Princess, and the Teacher: Voices from the Ottoman Harem. University of Texas Press. ISBN 978-0-292-78335-5.
- Sakaoğlu, Necdet (2008). Bu mülkün kadın sultanları: Vâlide sultanlar, hâtunlar, hasekiler, kadınefendiler, sultanefendiler. Oğlak Yayıncılık. ISBN 978-9-753-29623-6.
- Uçan, Lâle (2019). Son Halife Abdülmecid Efendi'nin Hayatı - Şehzâlik, Veliahtlık ve Halifelik Yılları (PDF) (PhD Thesis). Istanbul University Institute of Social Sciences.
- Uluçay, Mustafa Çağatay (2011). Padişahların kadınları ve kızları. Ankara: Ötüken. ISBN 978-9-754-37840-5.
