= Ottoman family tree =

List of family tree of the Ottoman Empire

This is a male family tree for all the Ottoman Sultans and their mothers.

== Family tree ==
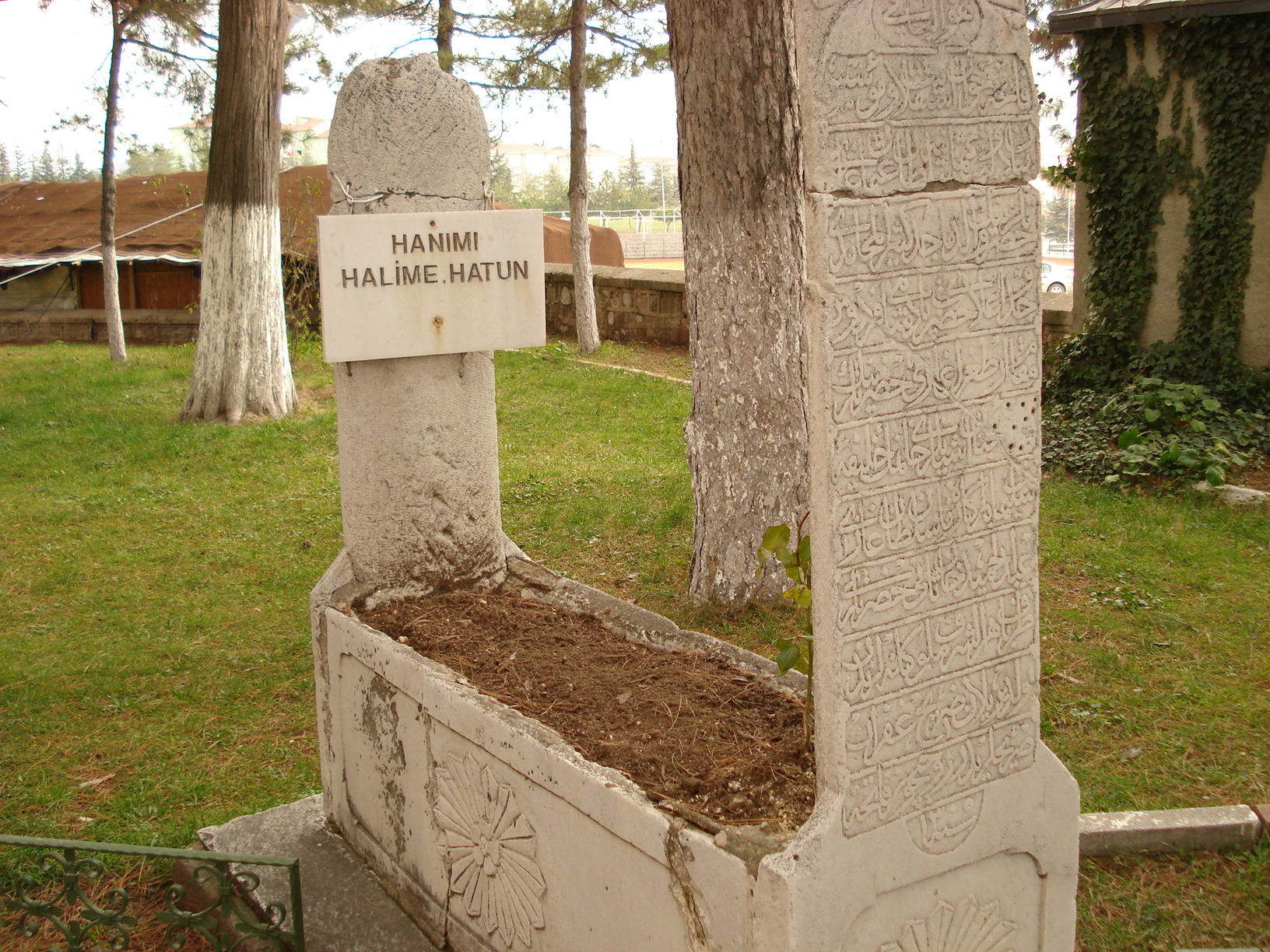
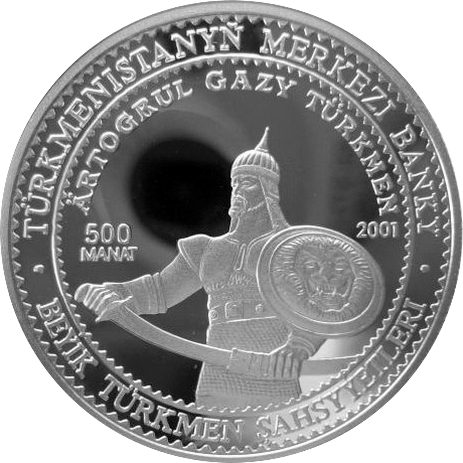
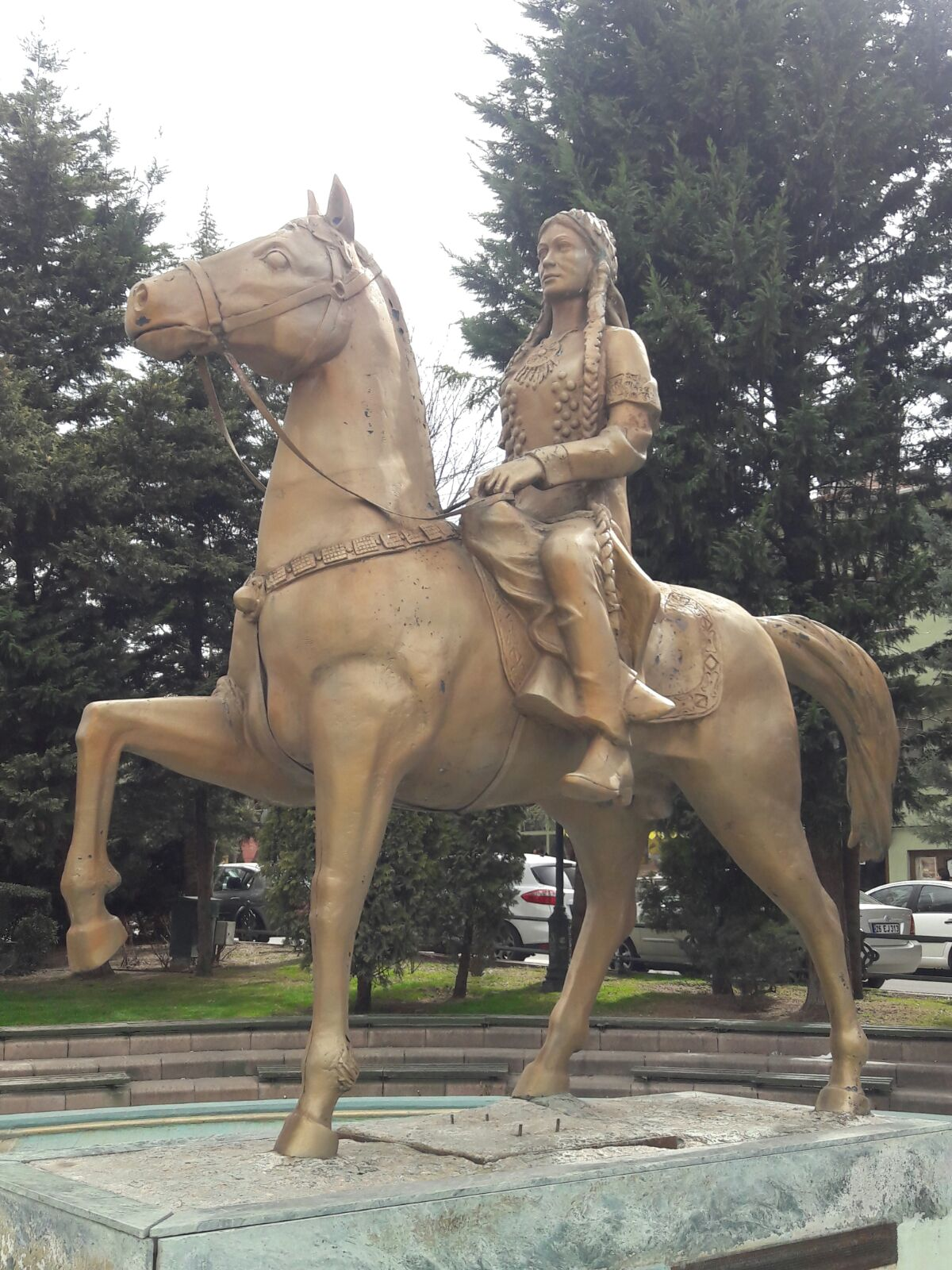
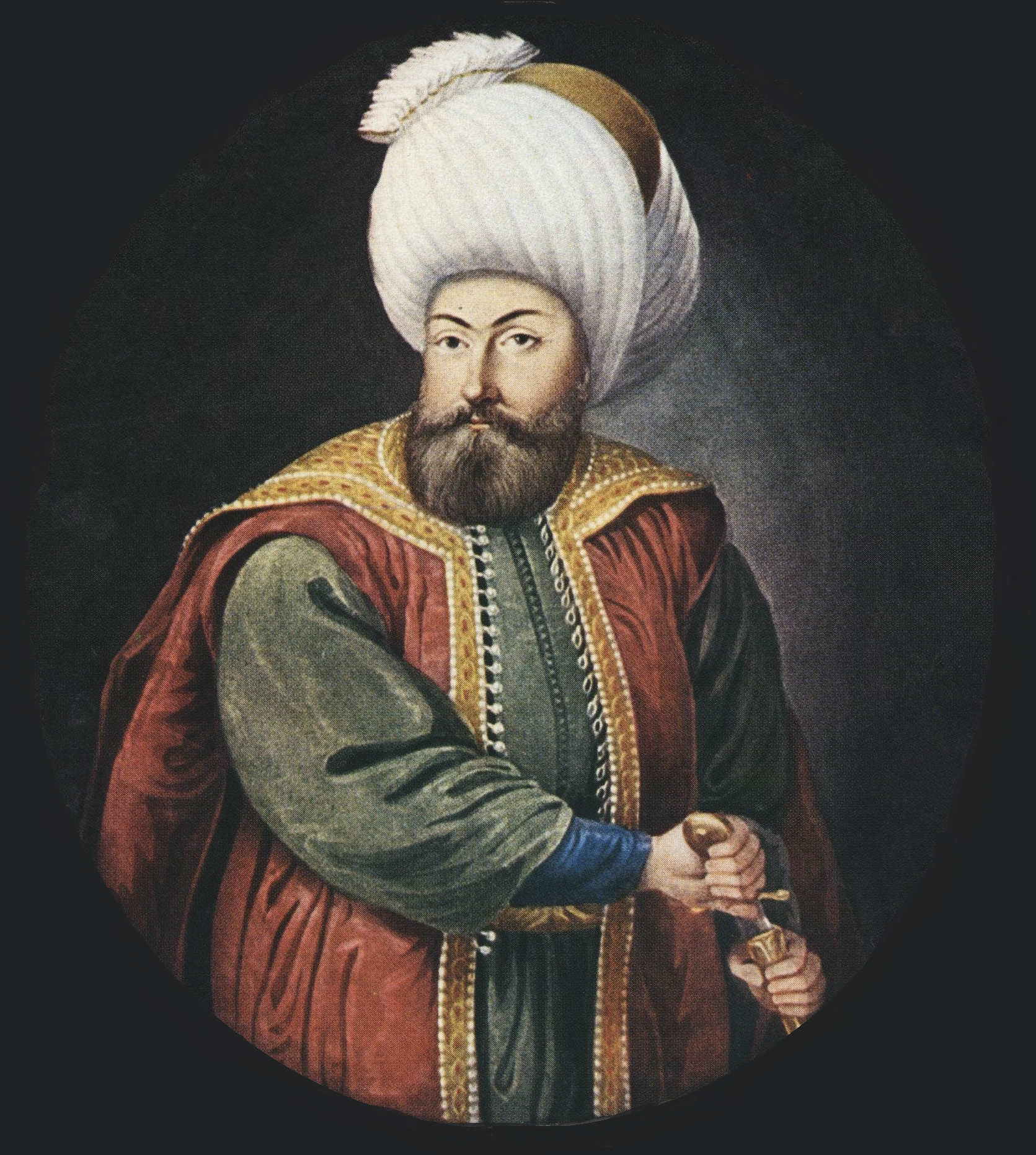
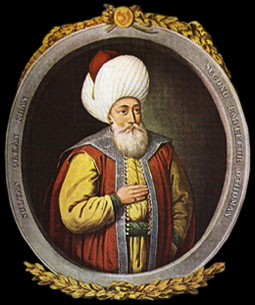
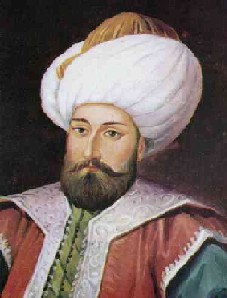
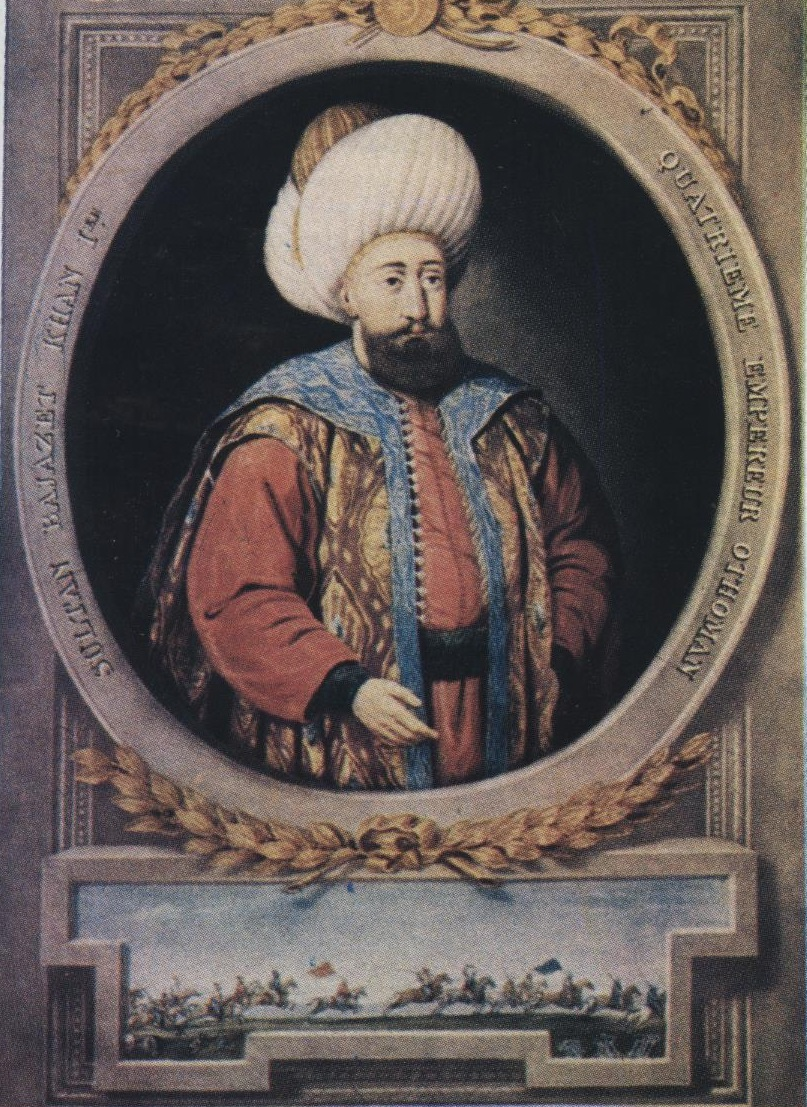
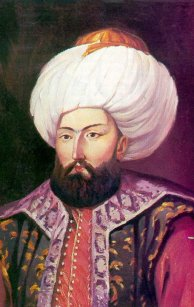
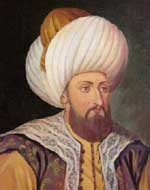
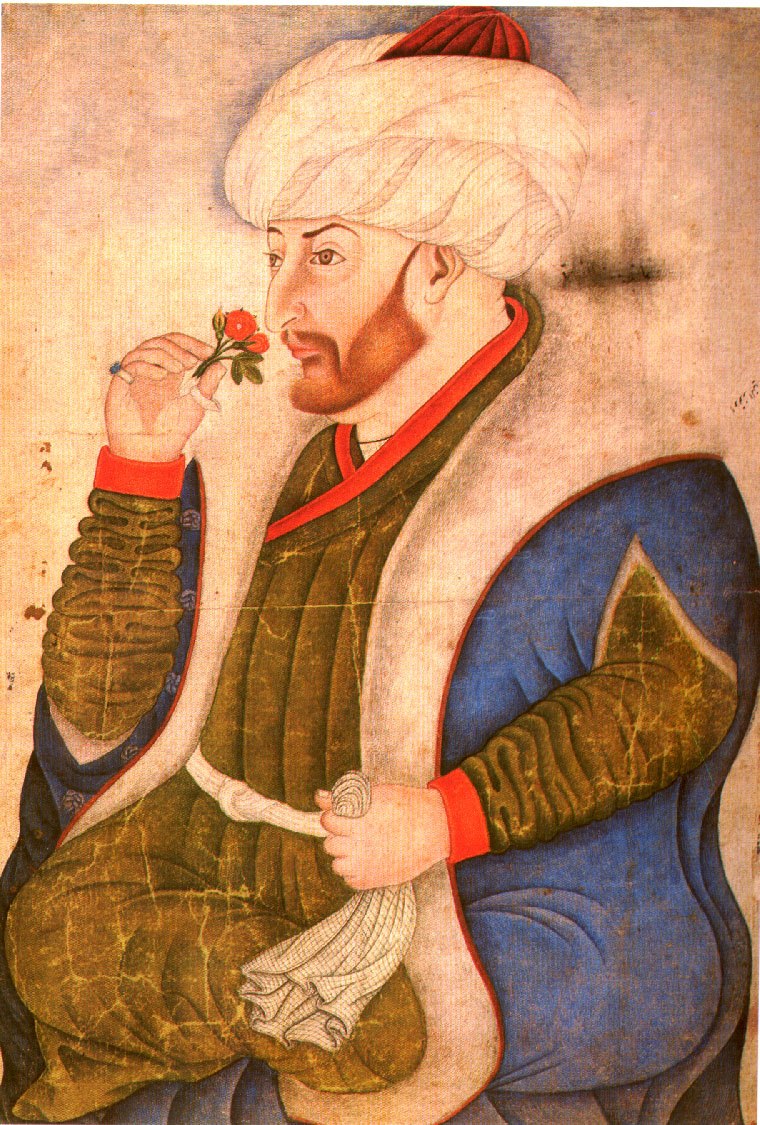
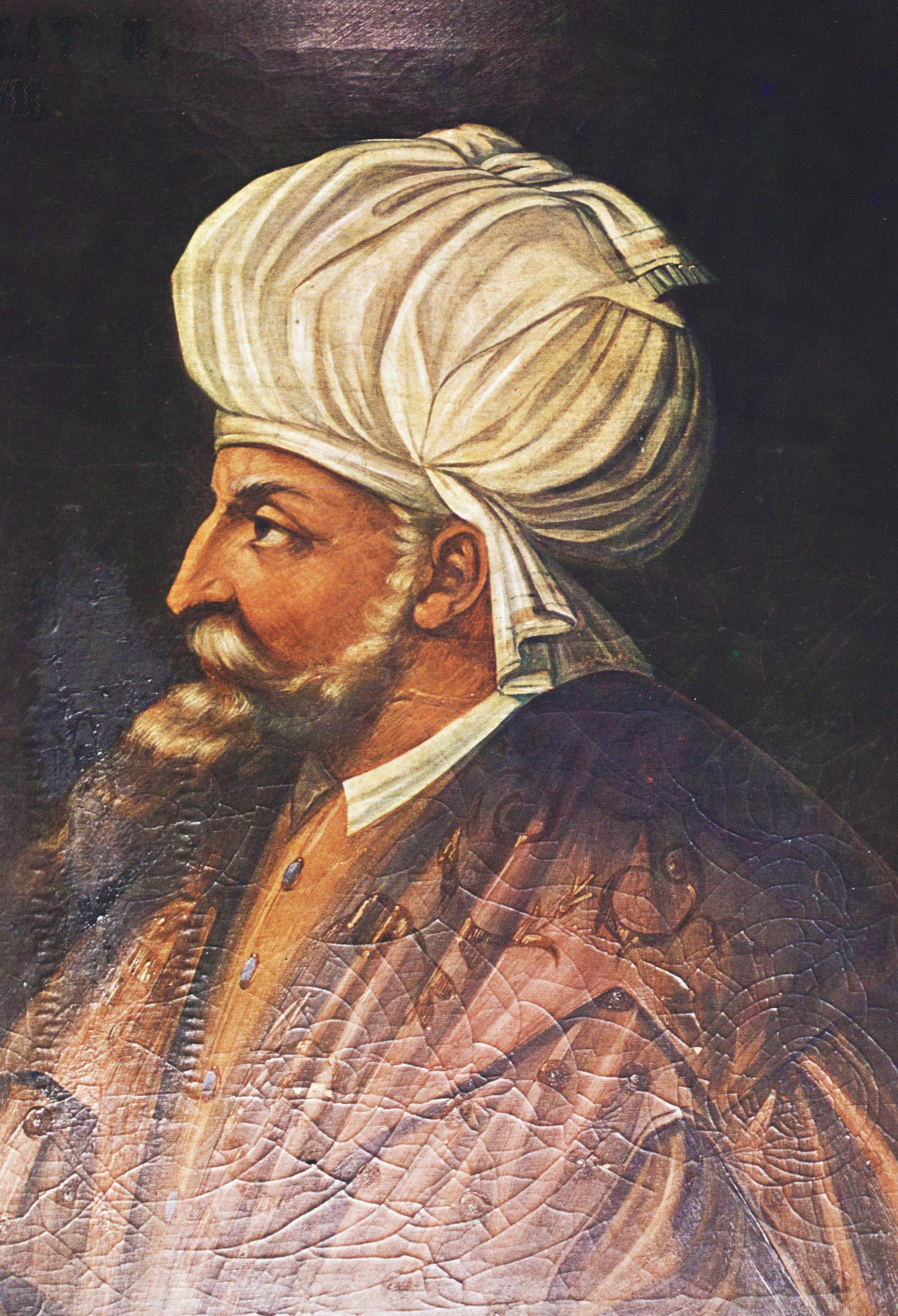
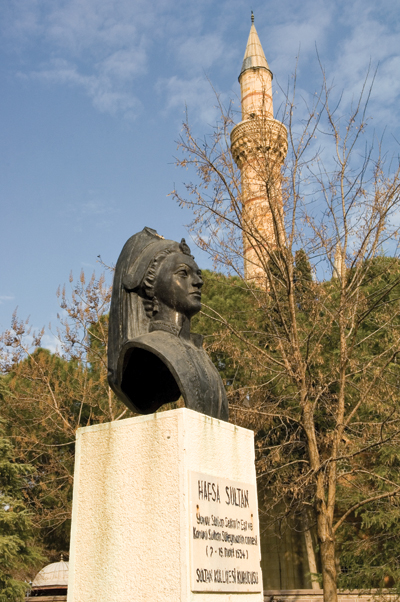
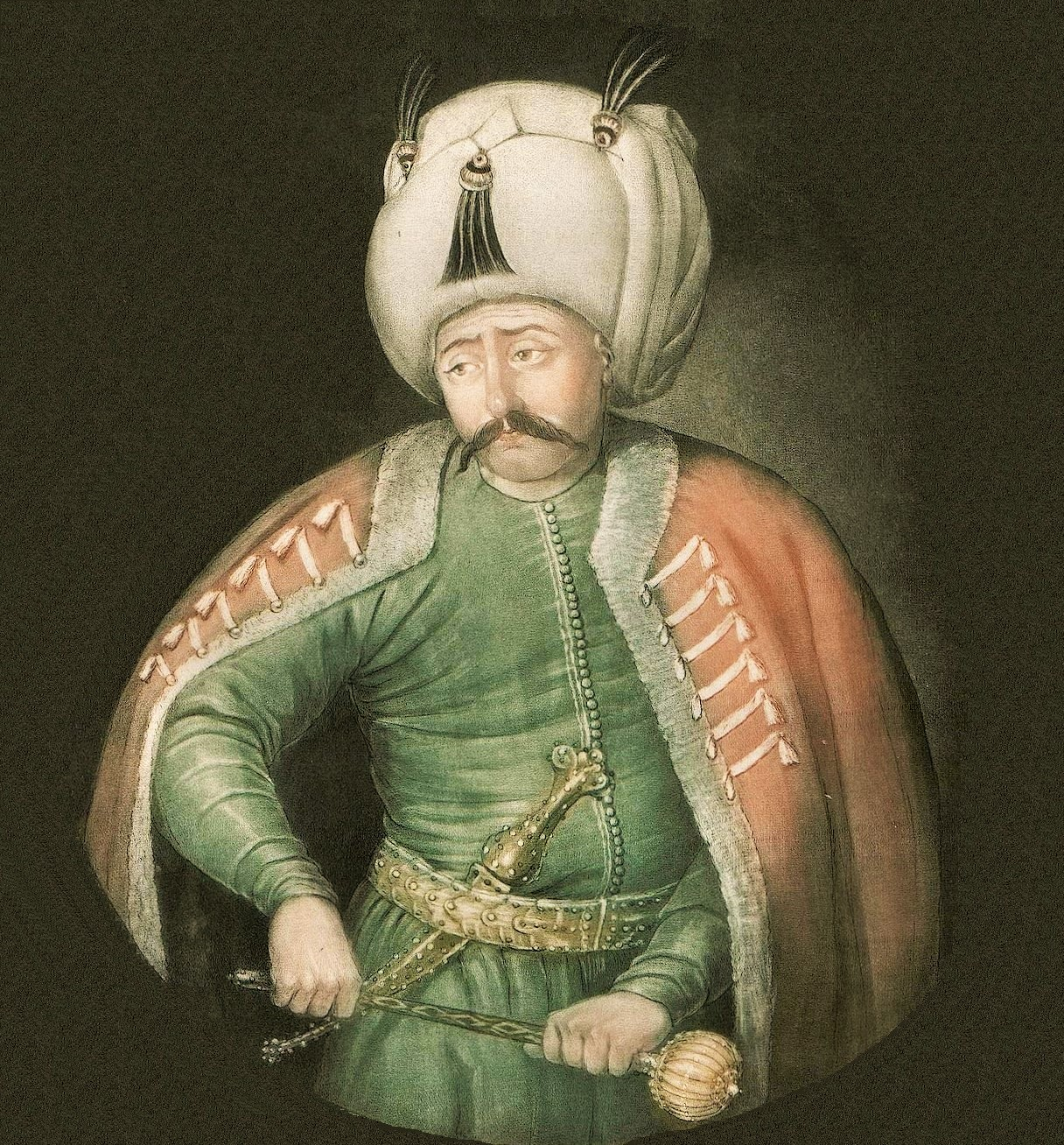
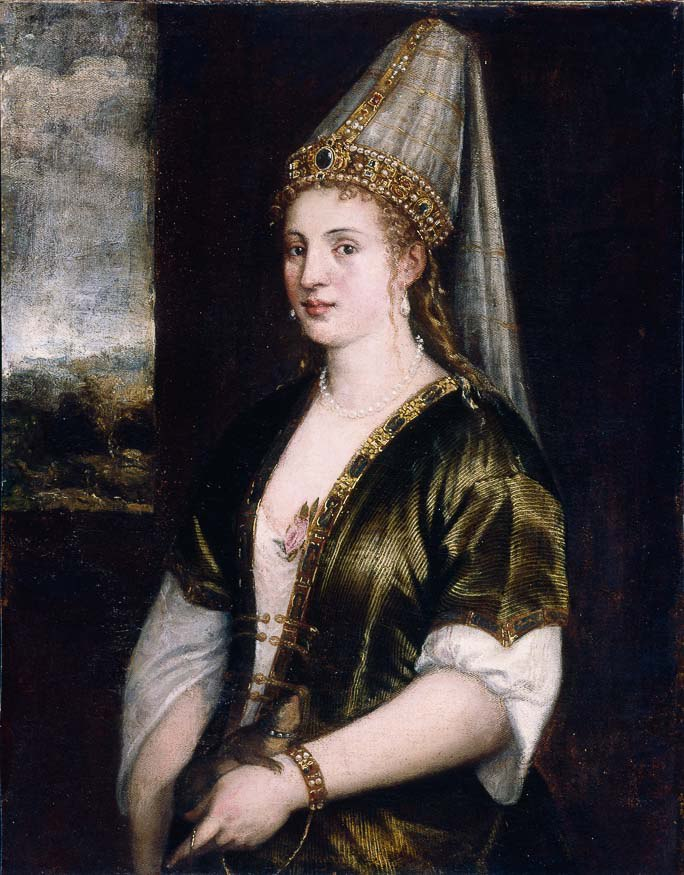
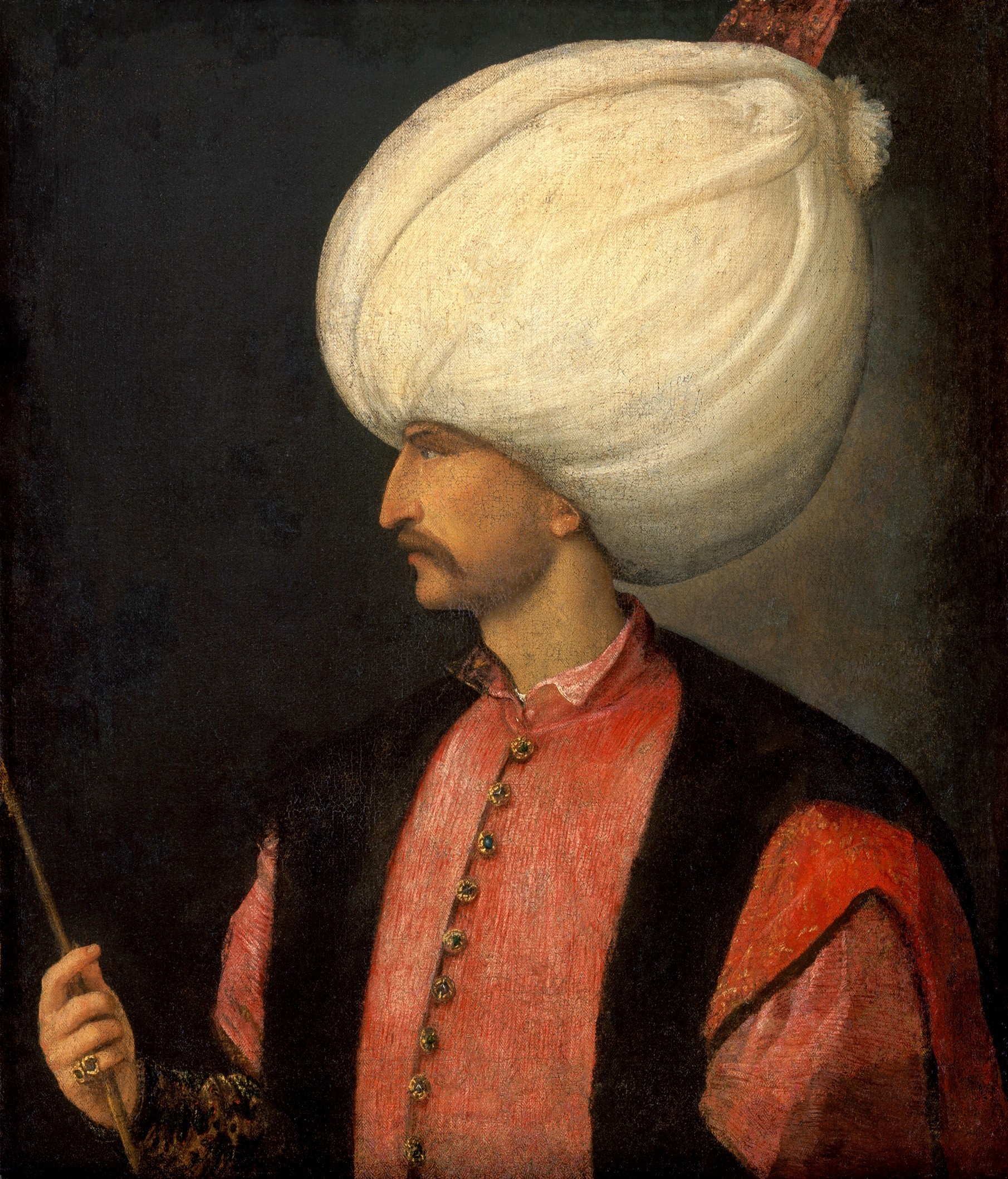
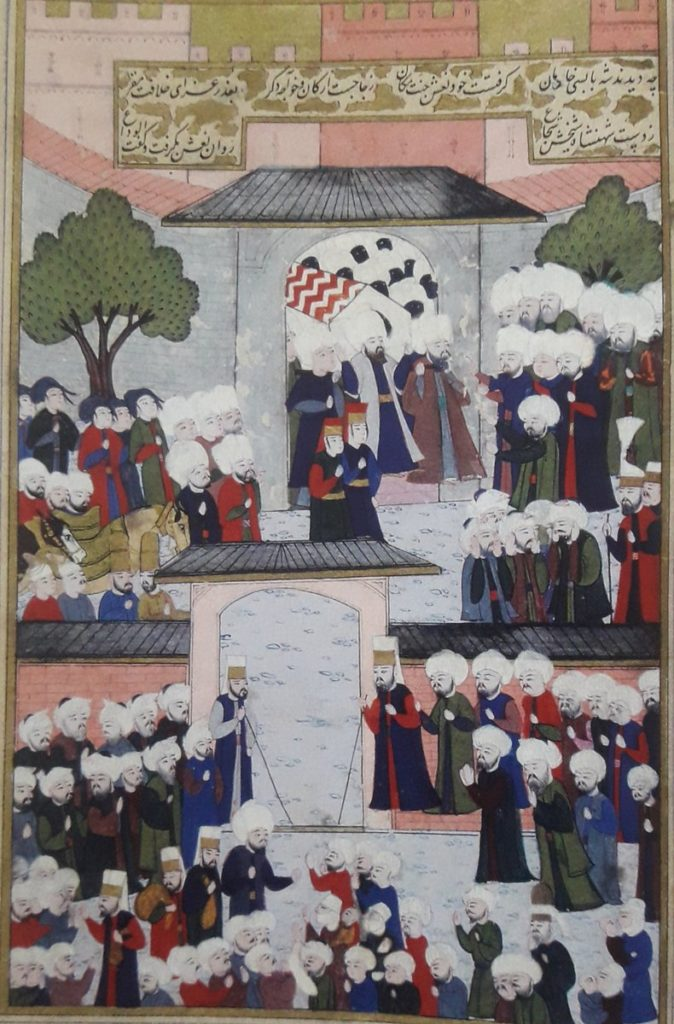
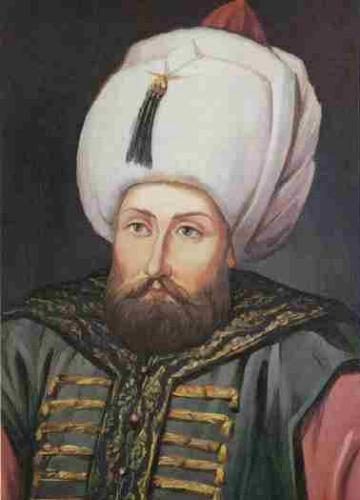
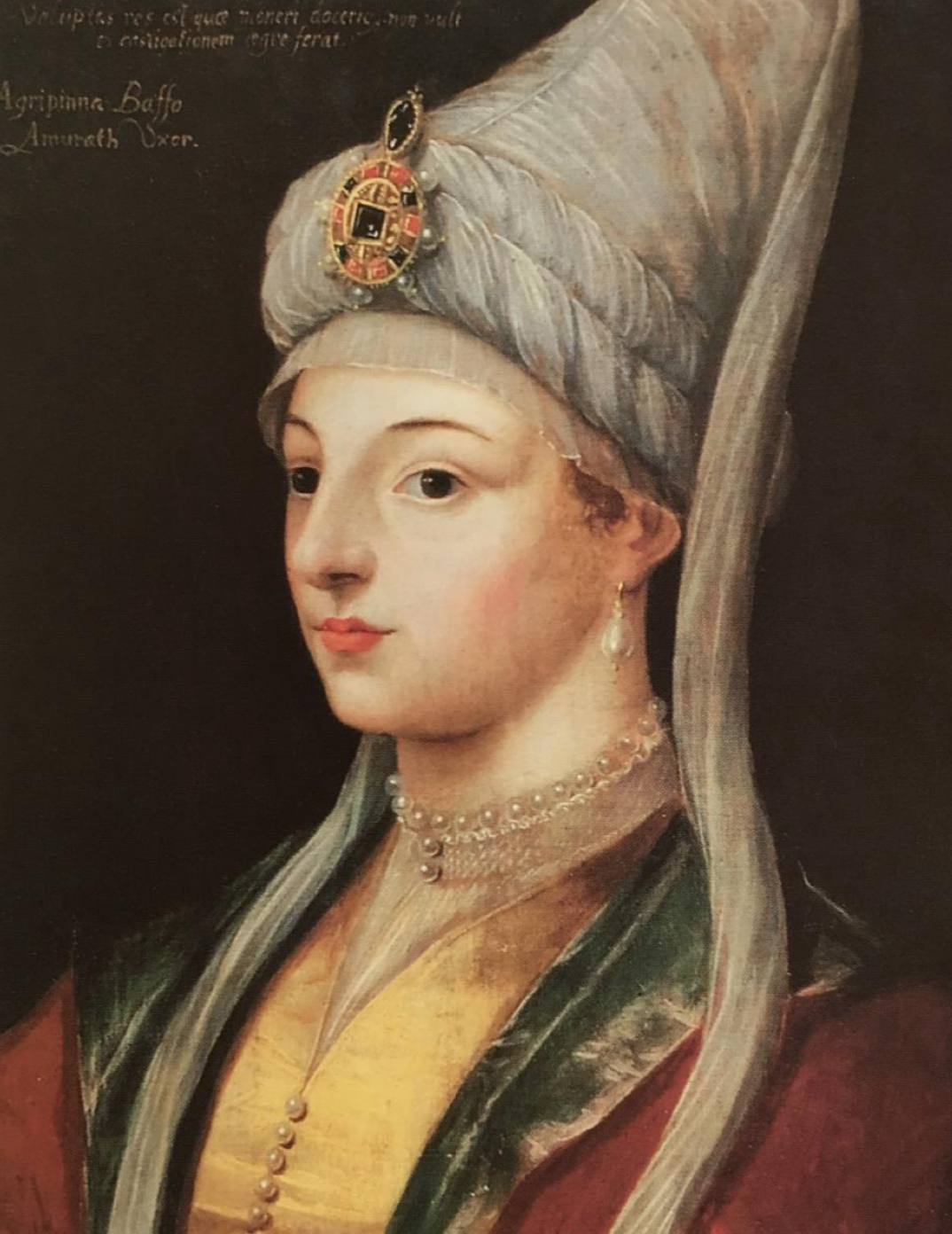
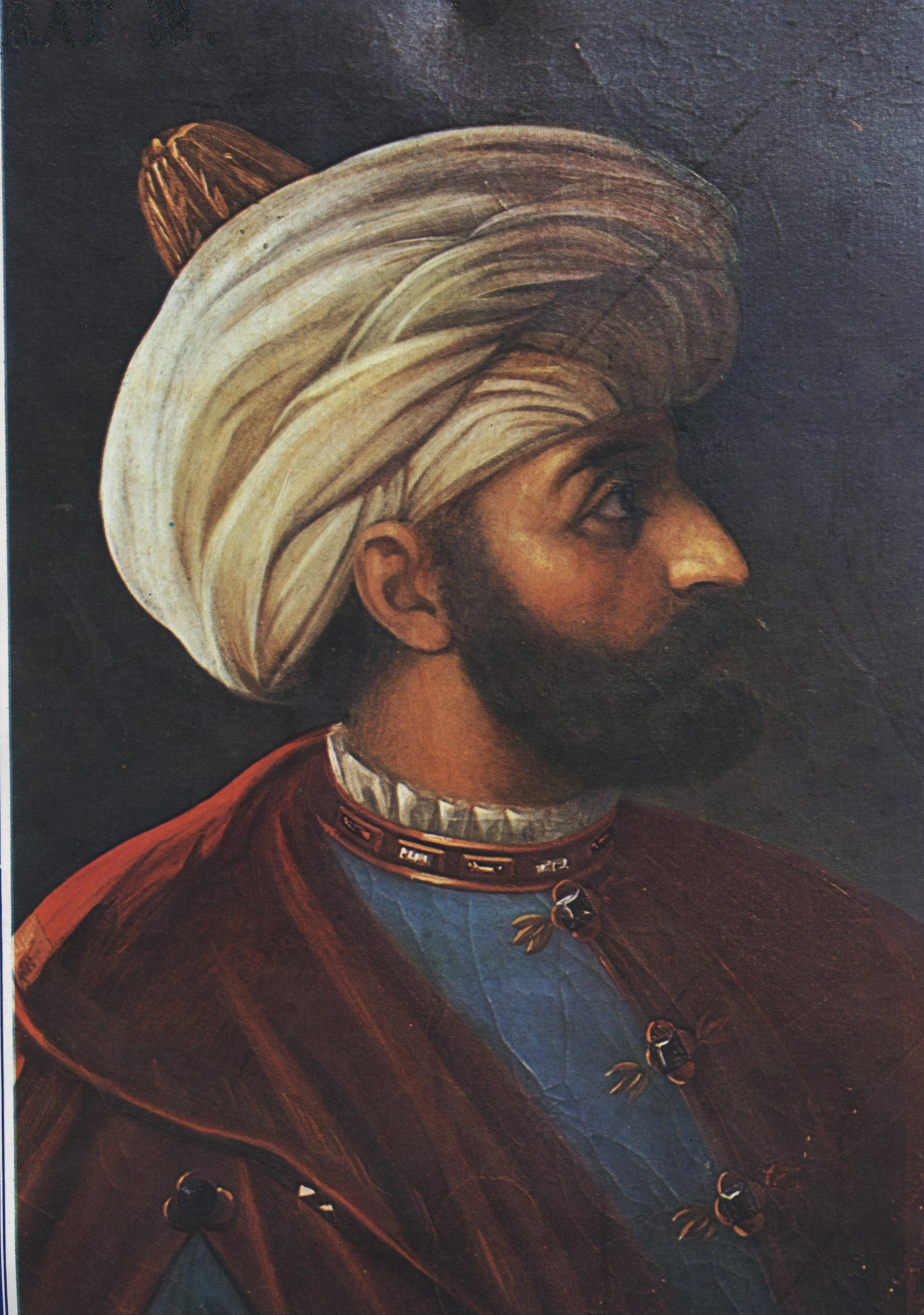
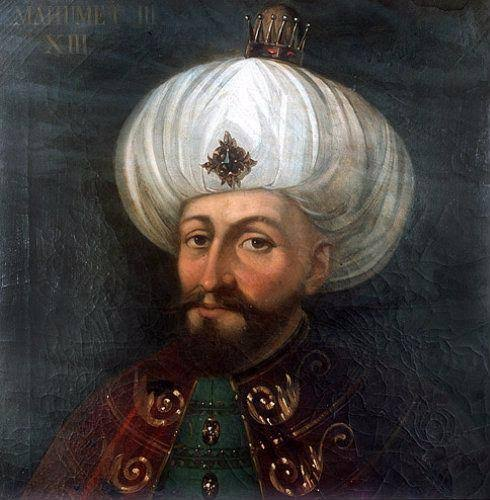
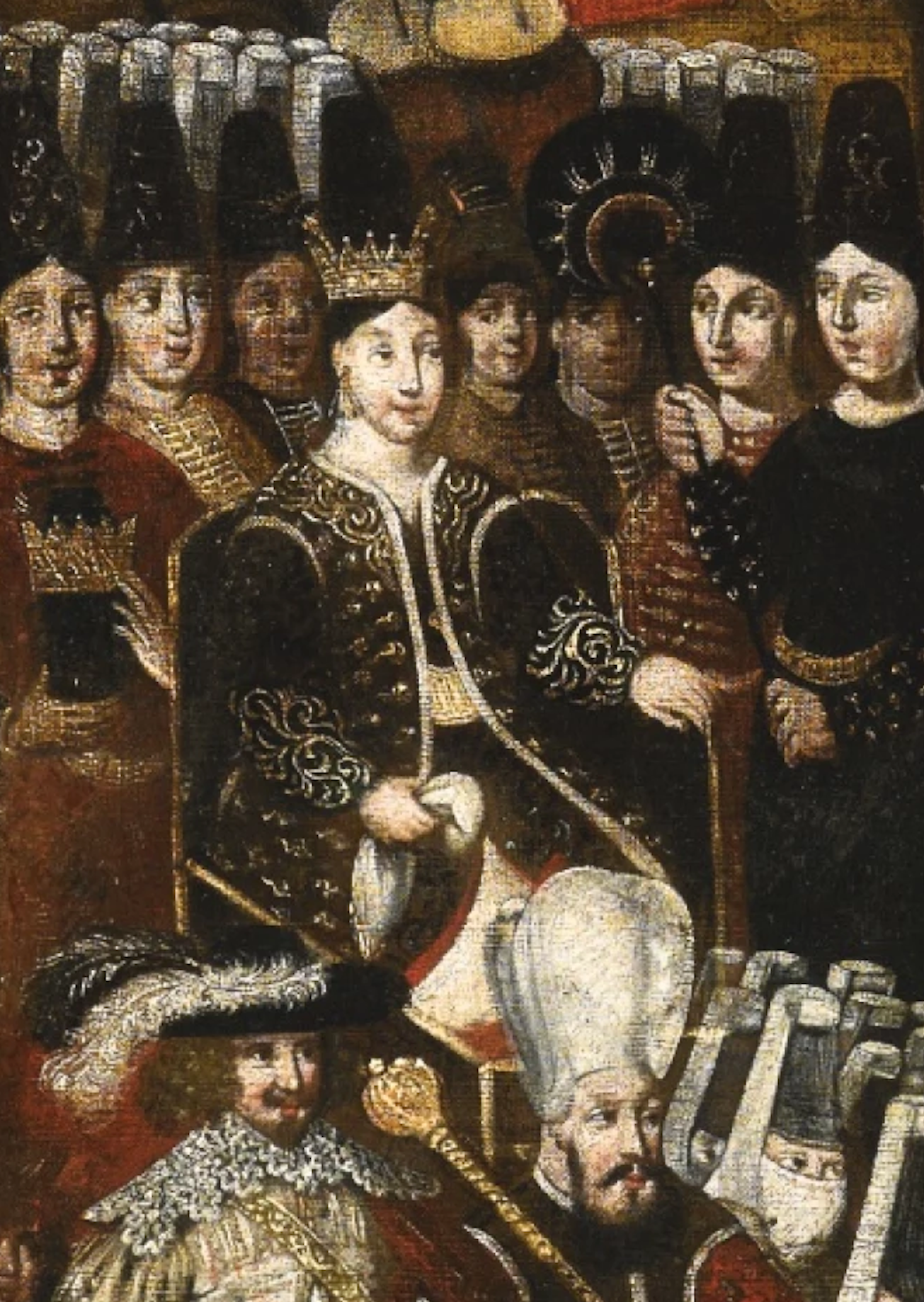
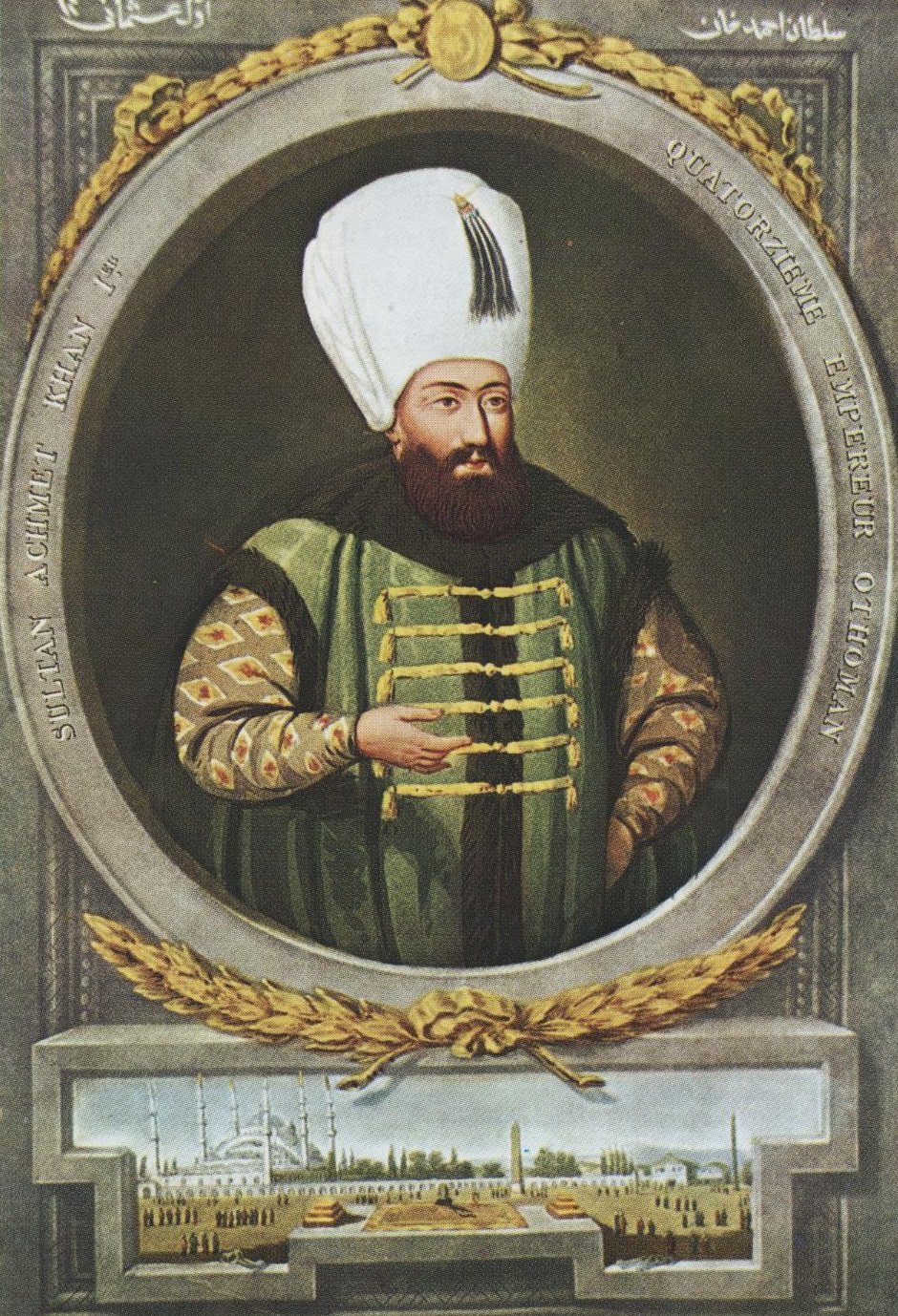
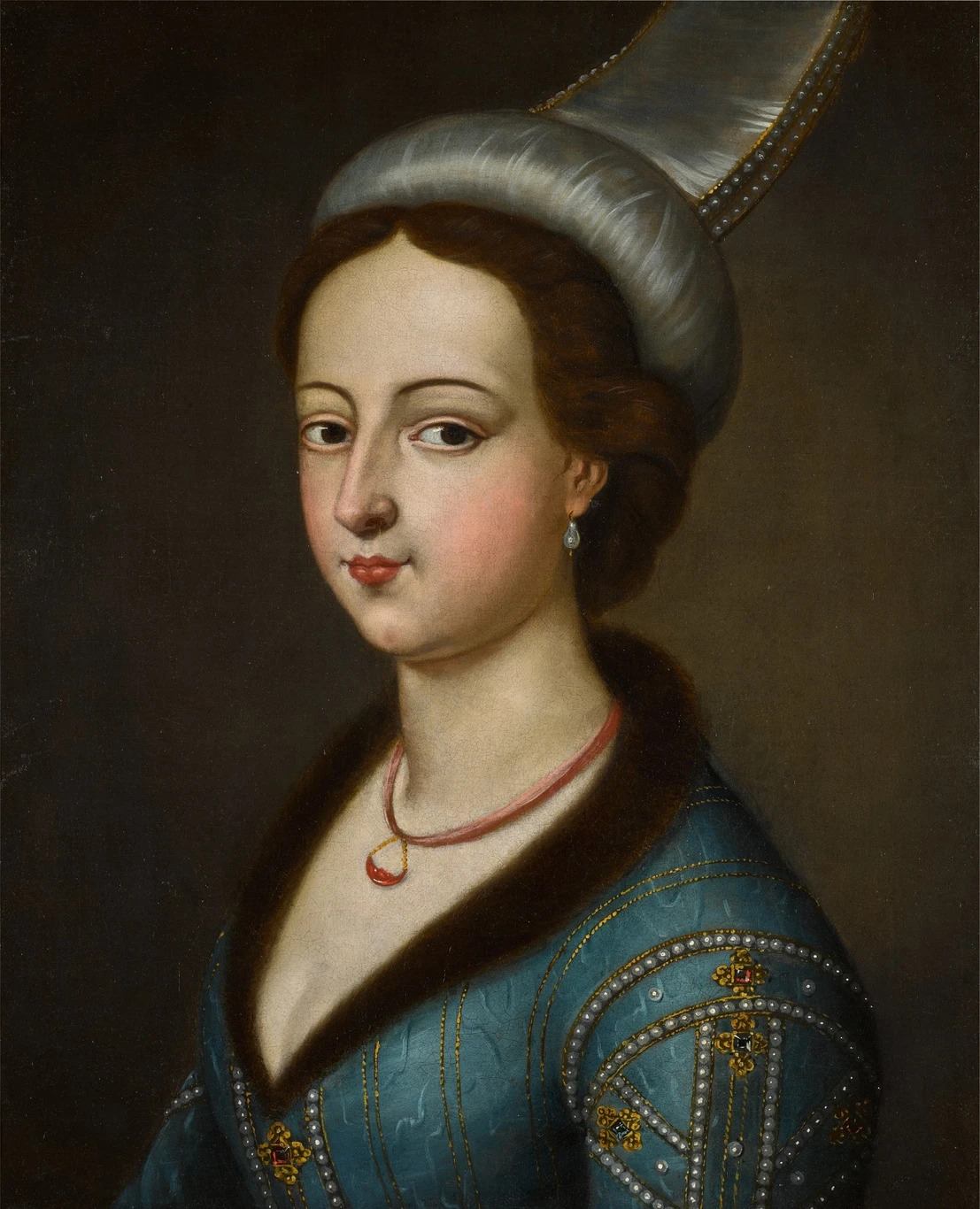
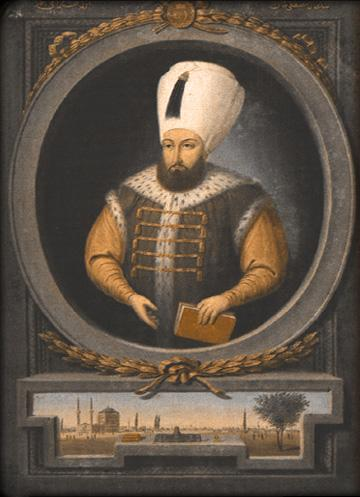
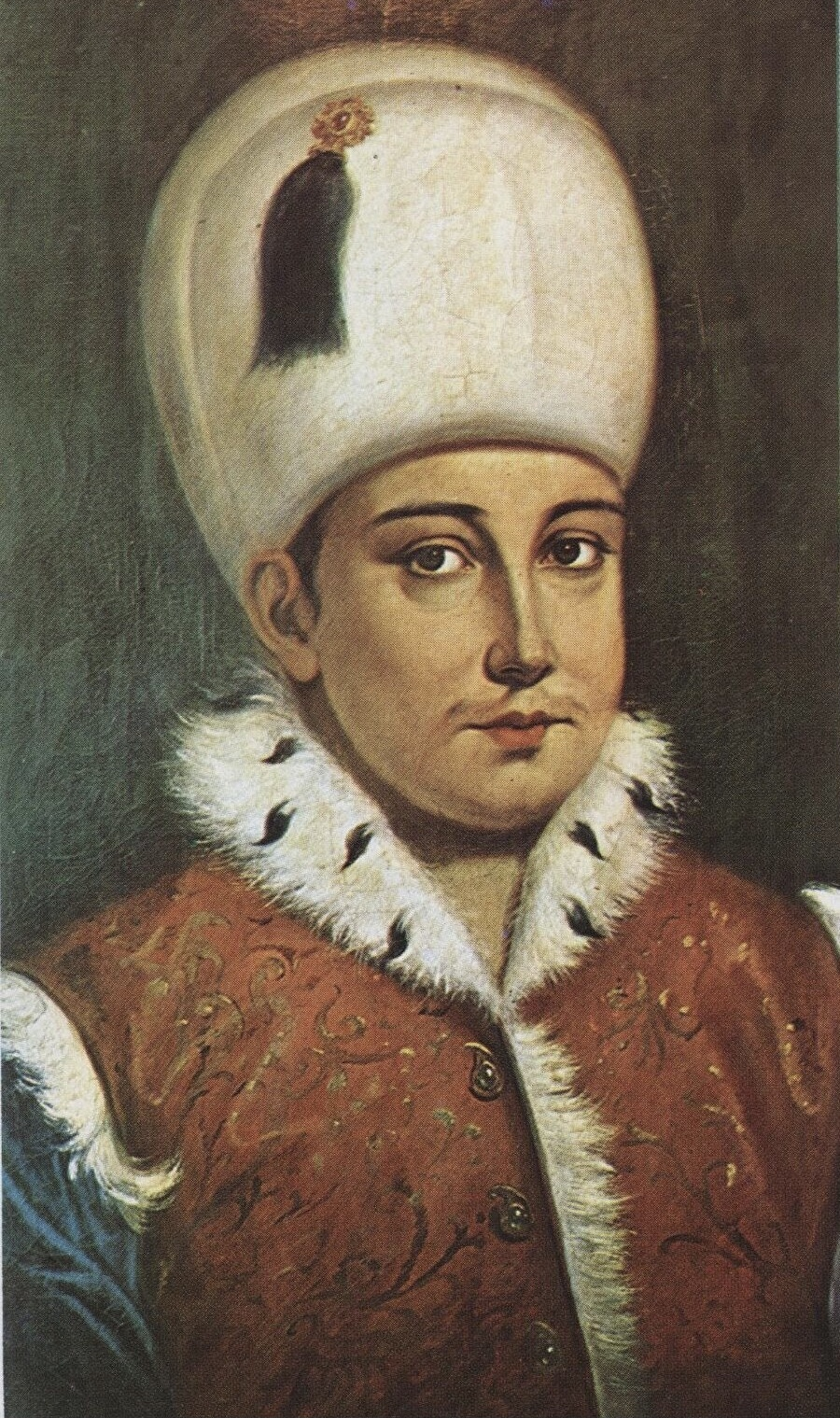
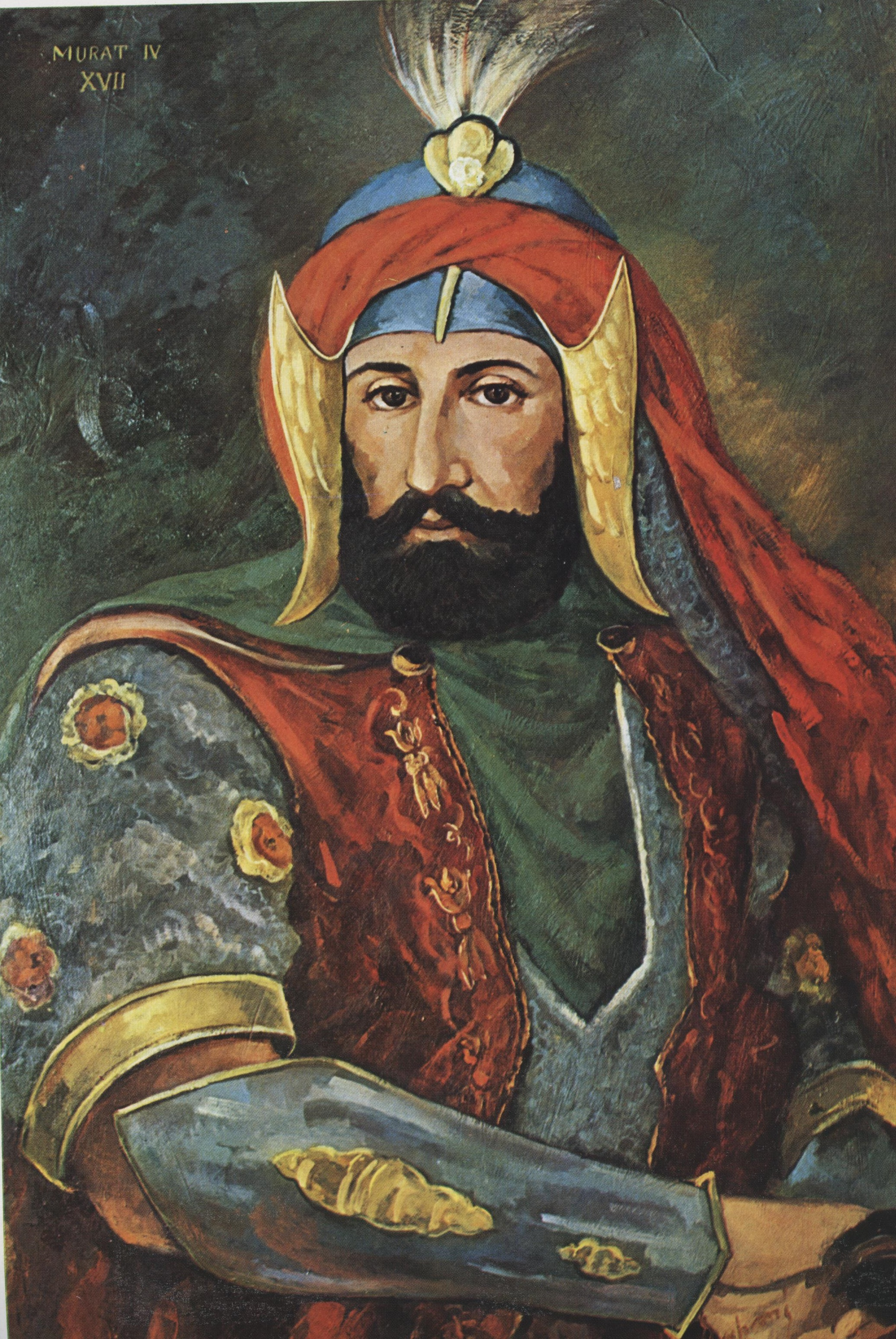
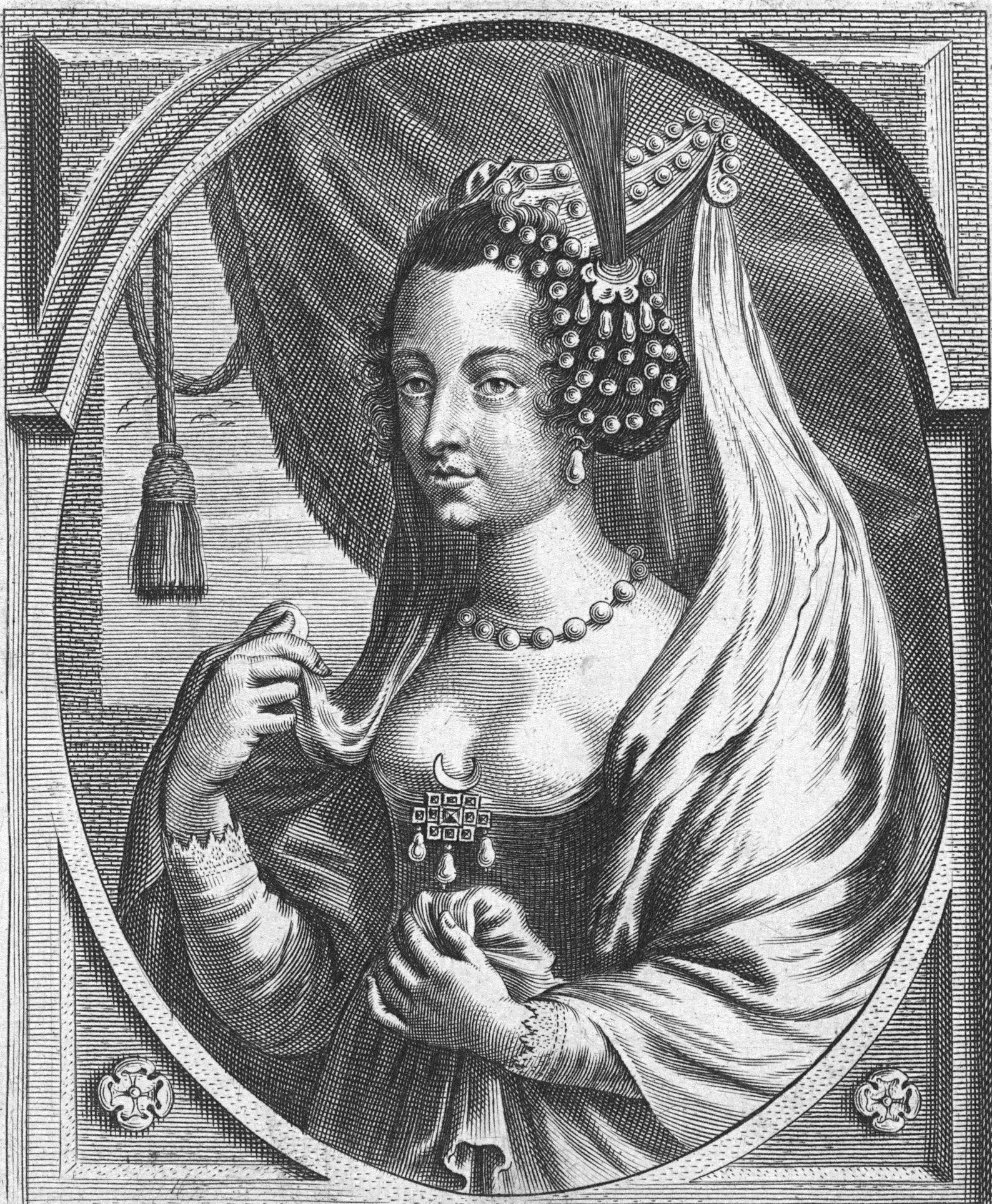
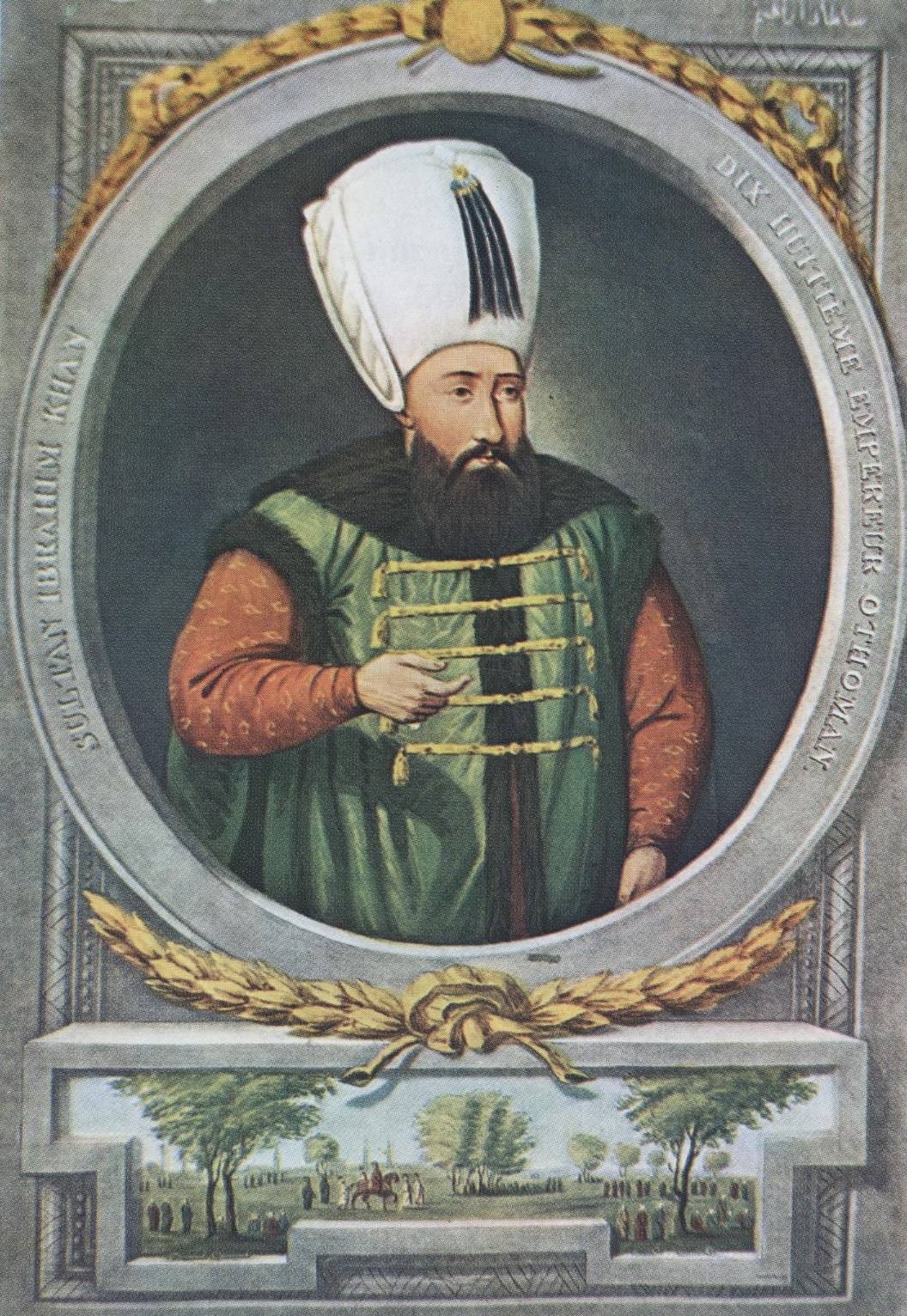
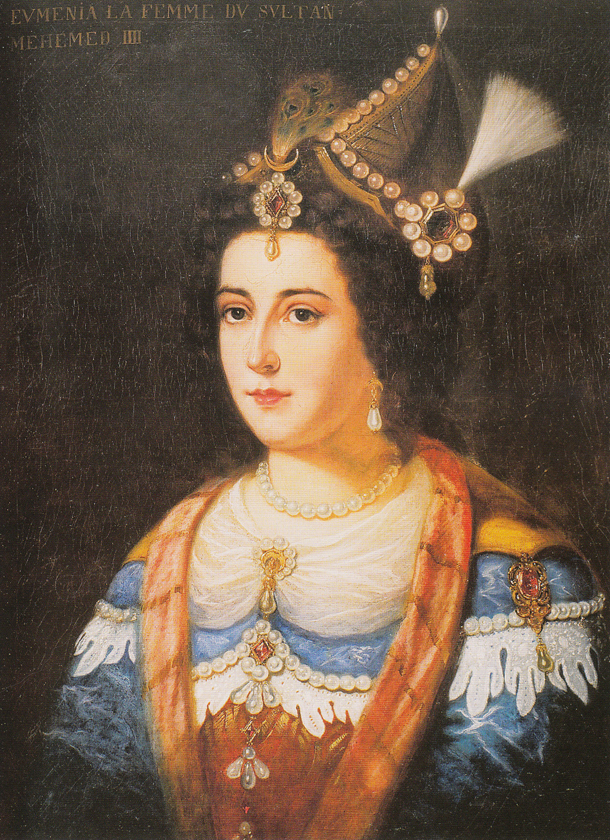
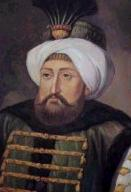
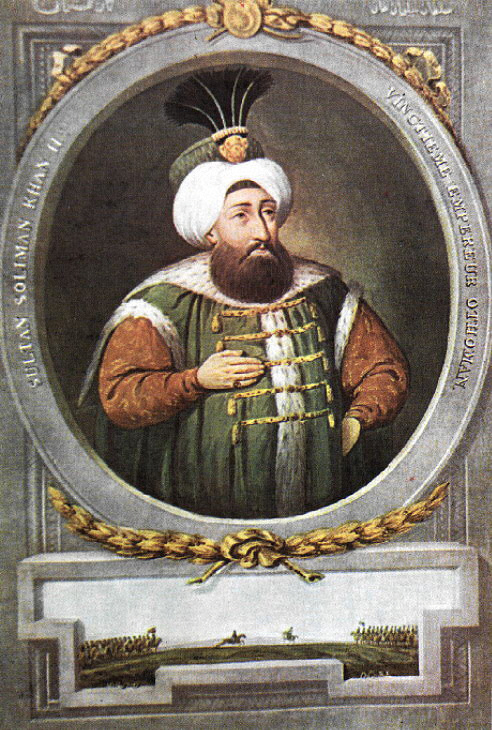
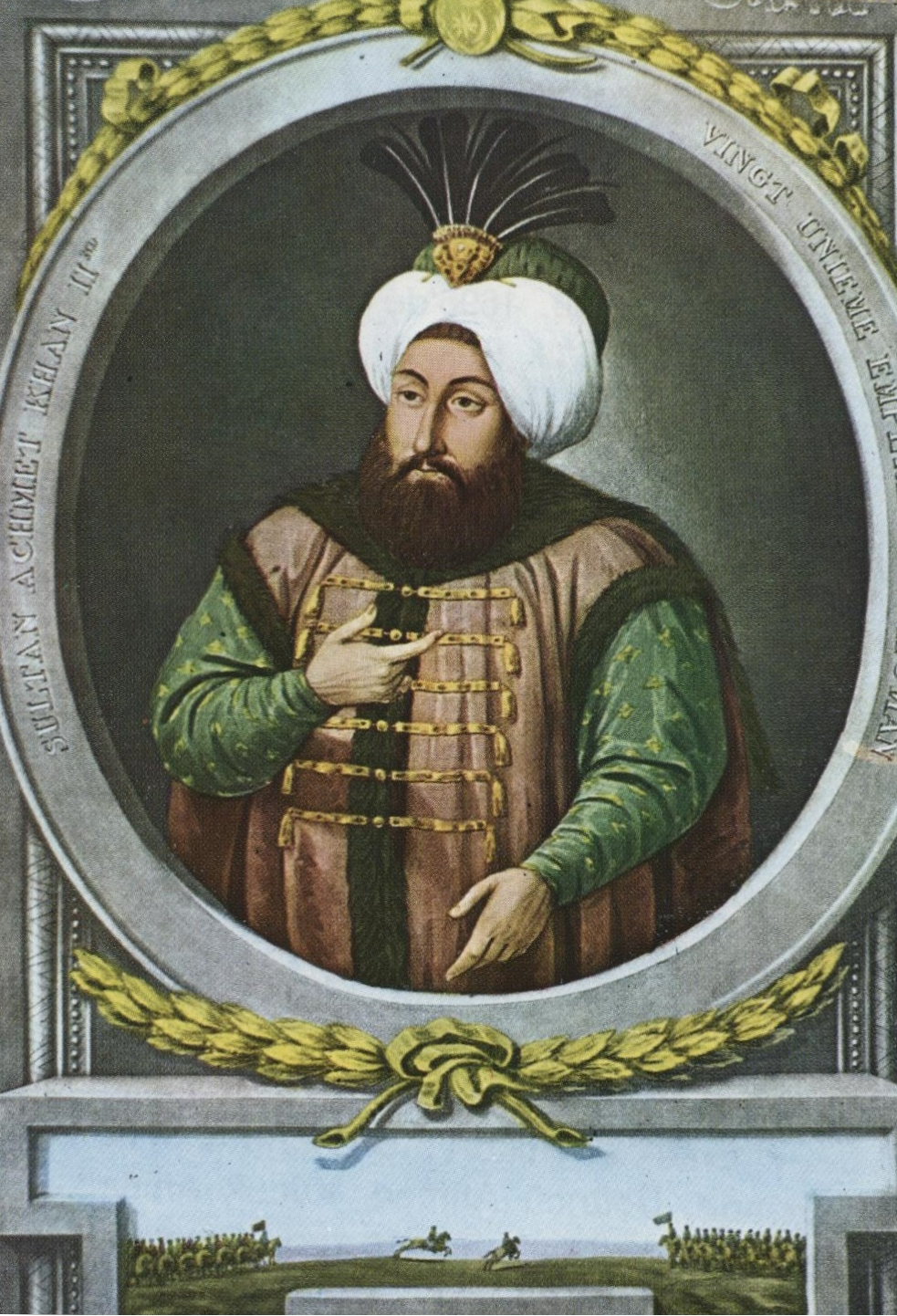
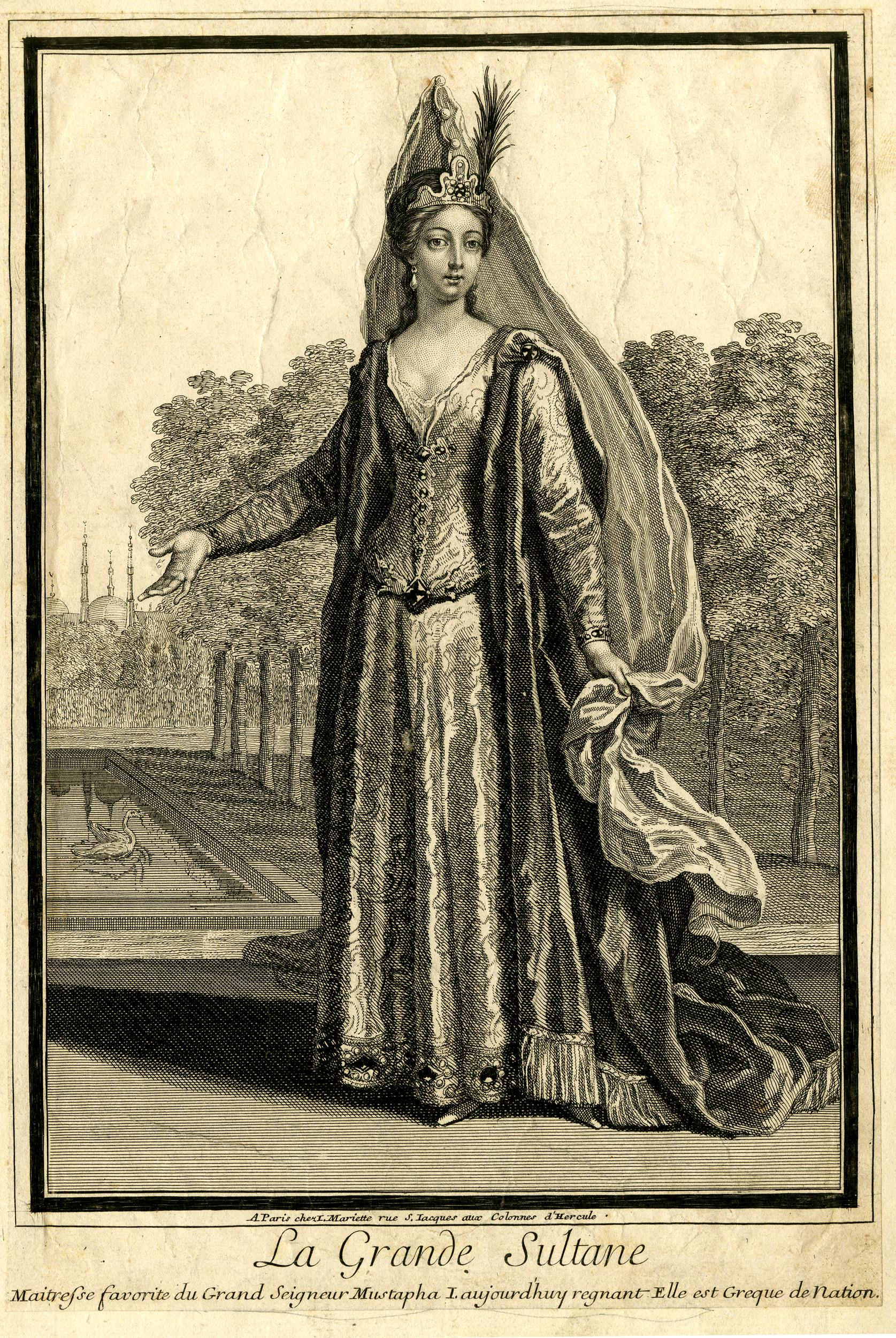
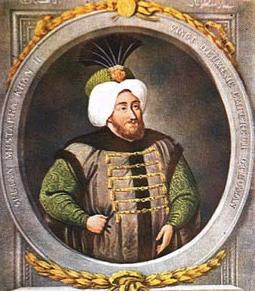
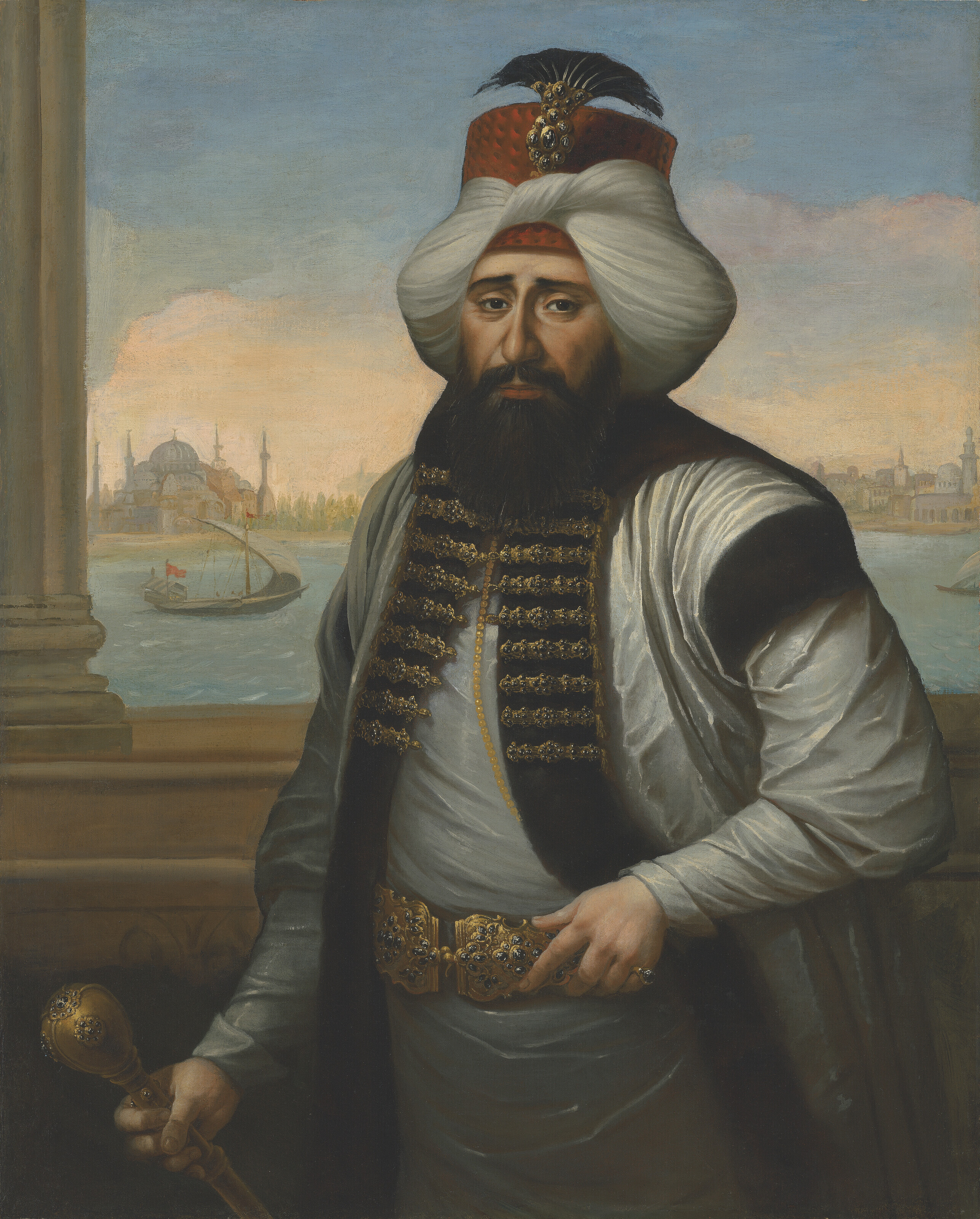
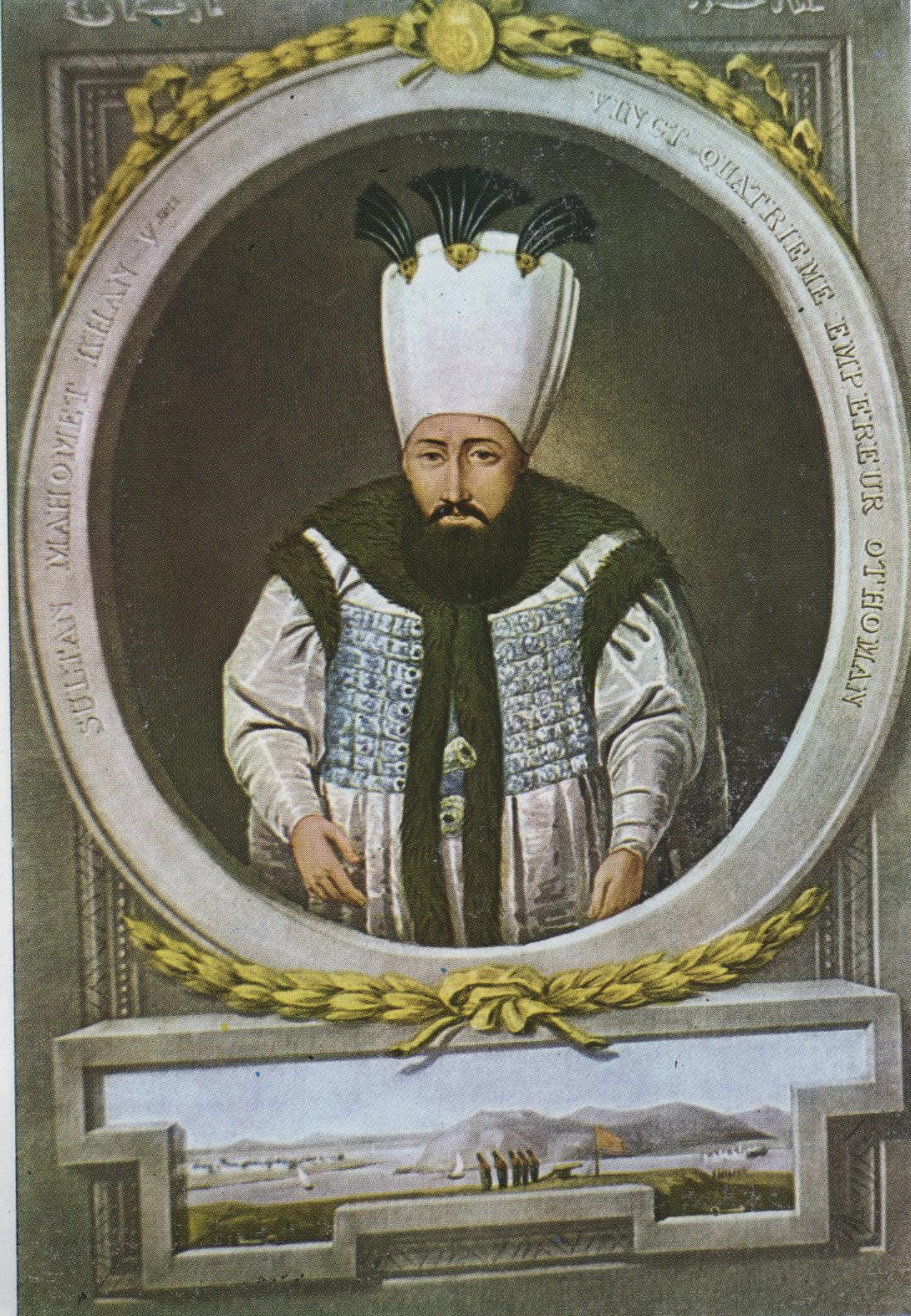
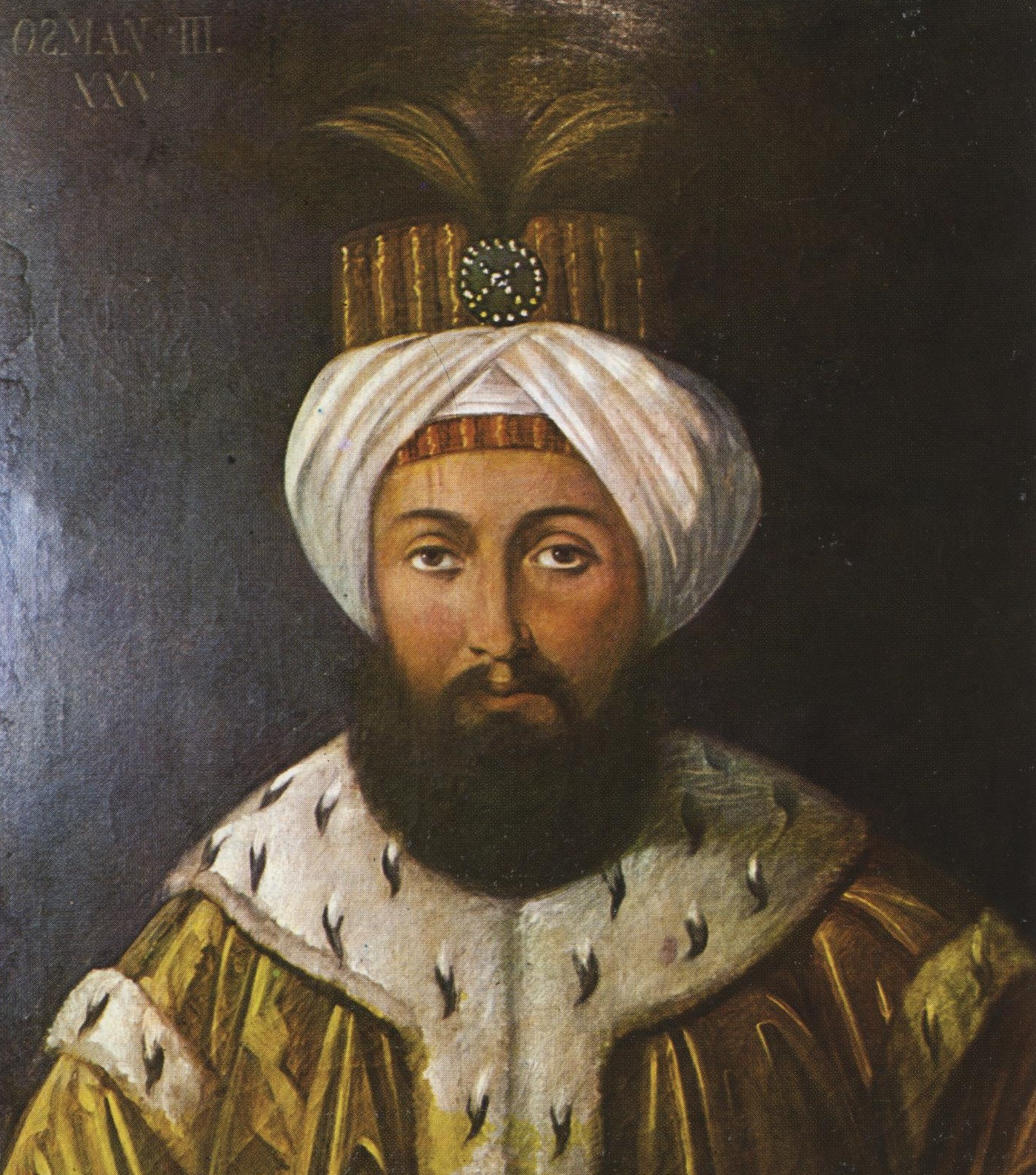
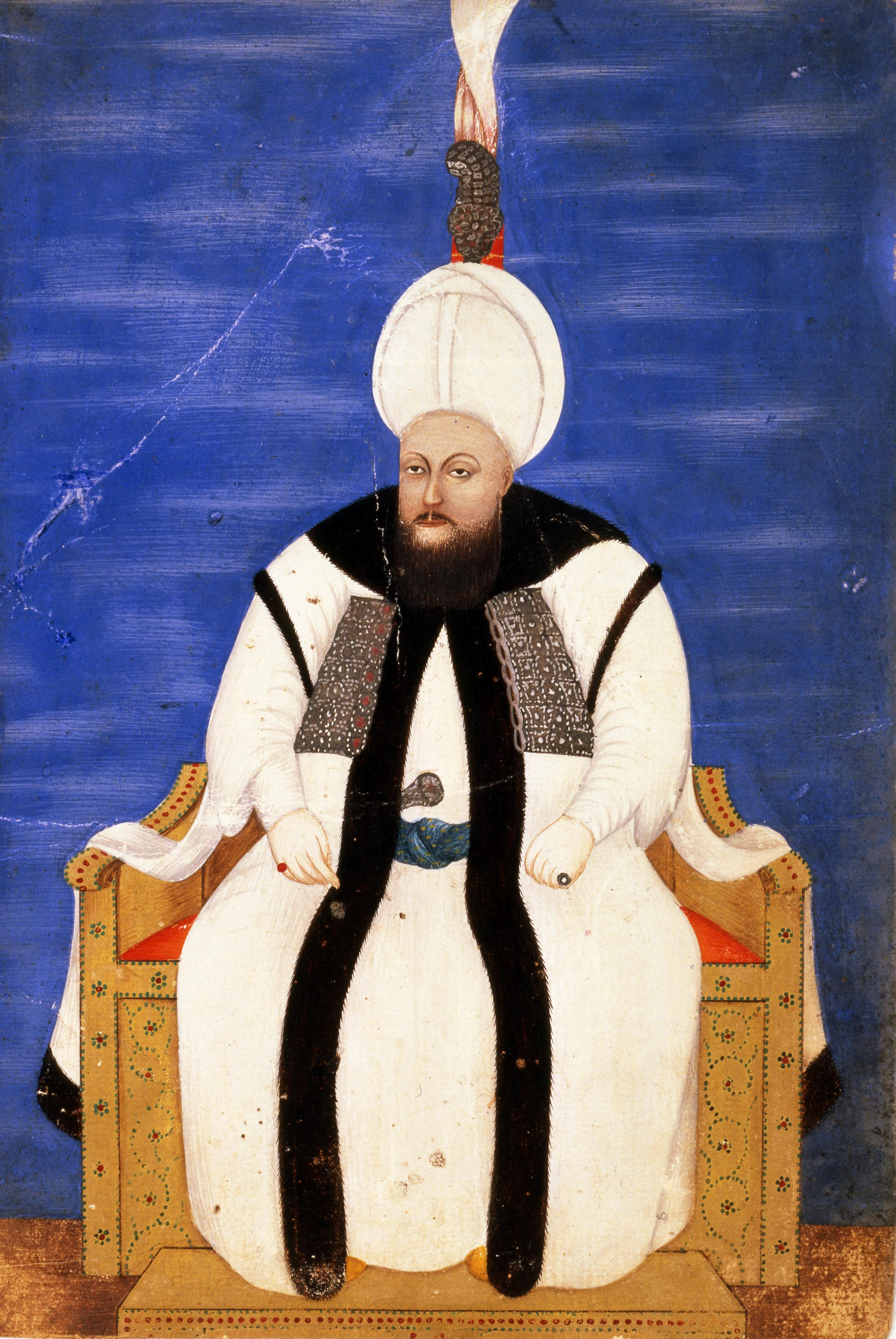
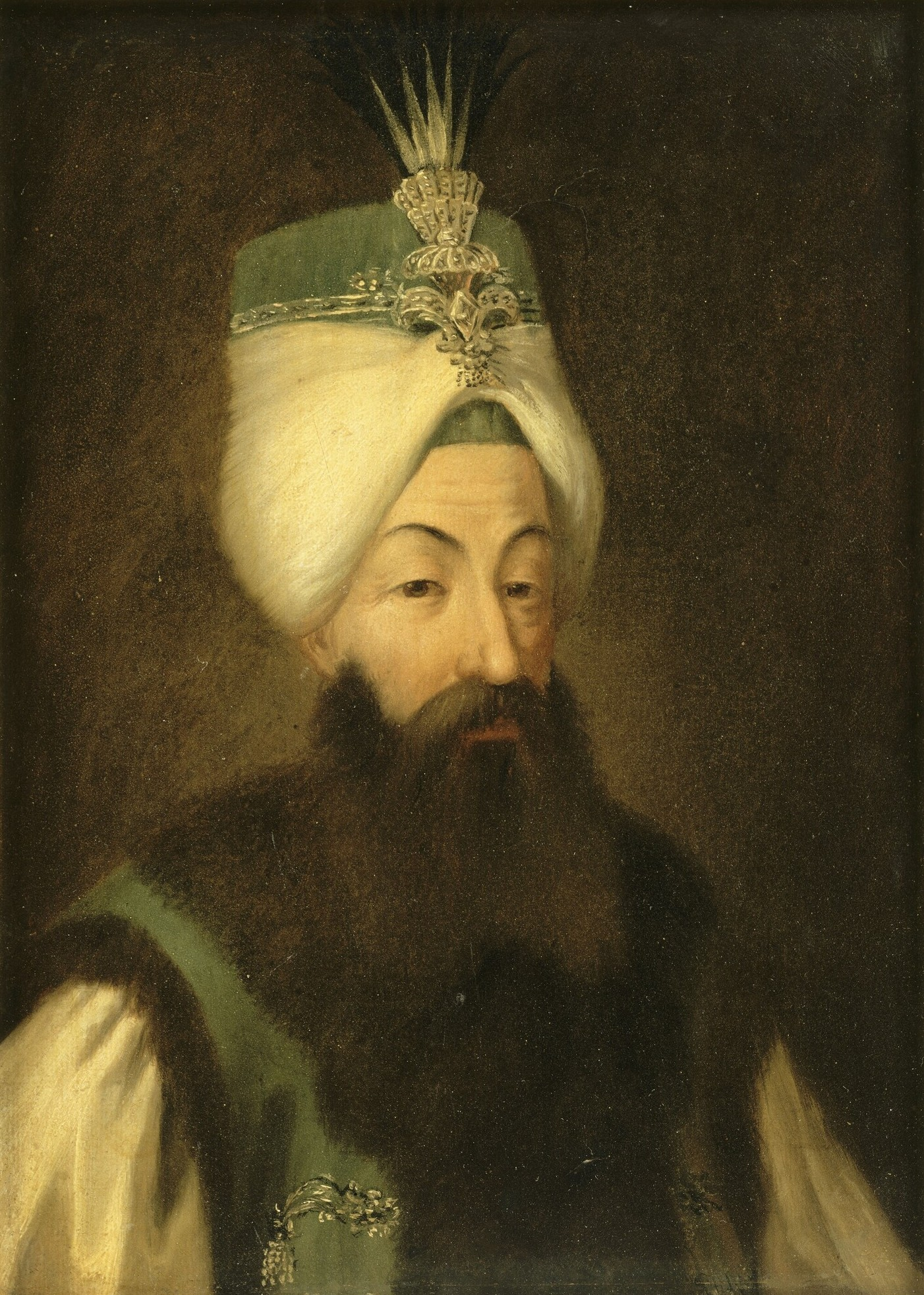
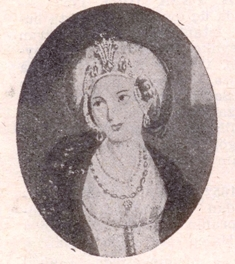
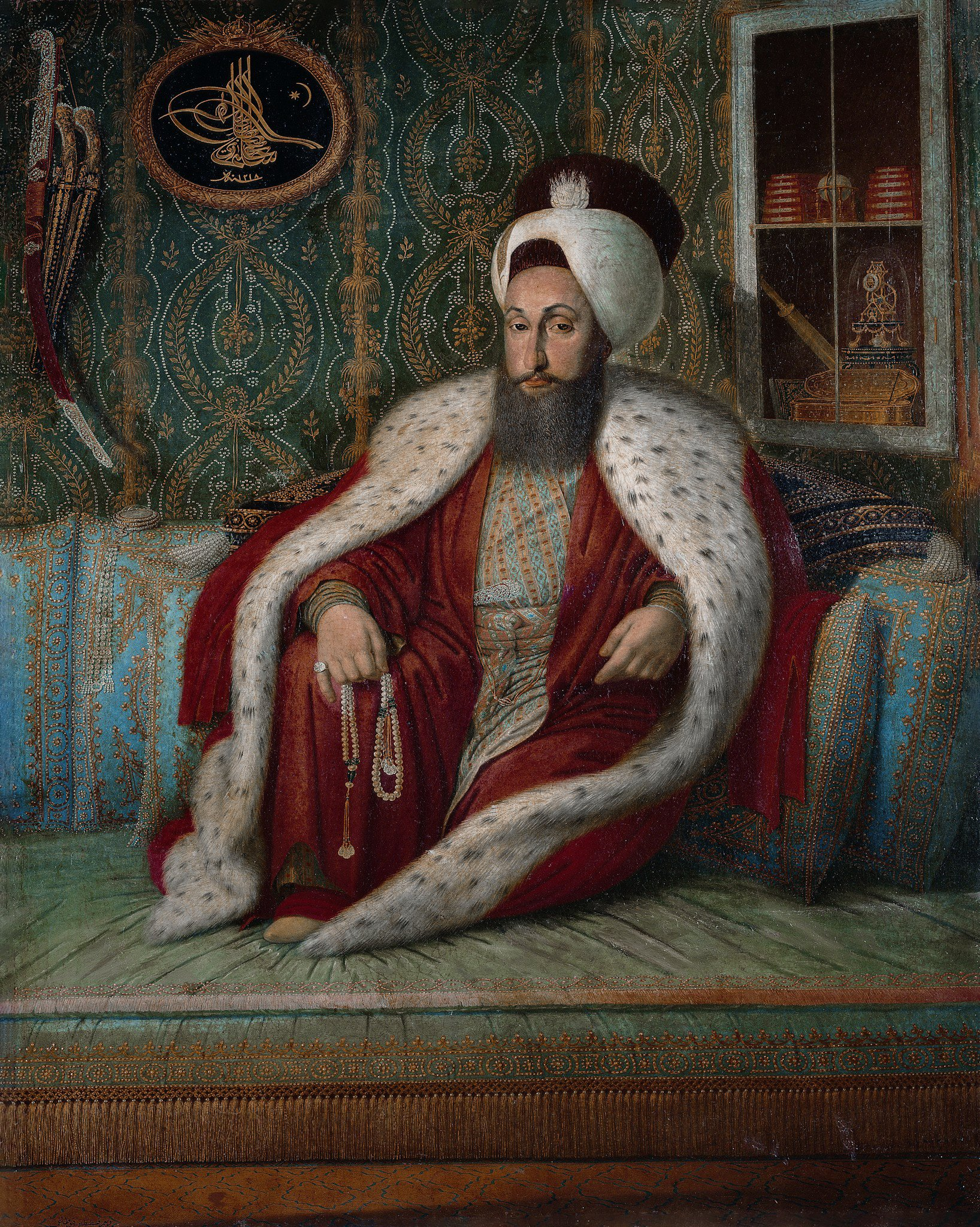
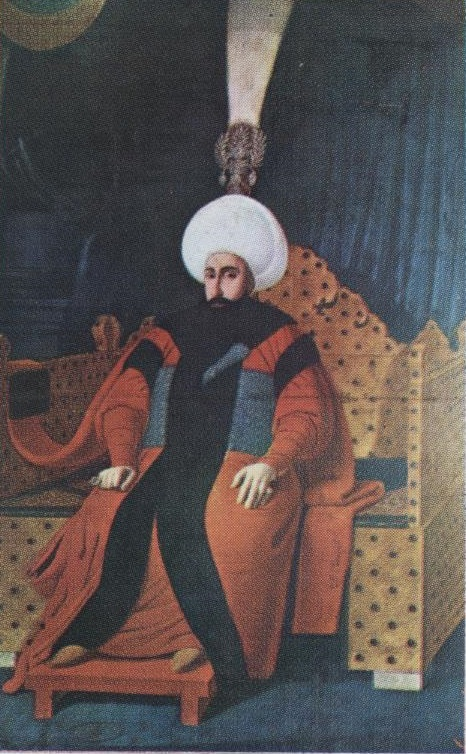
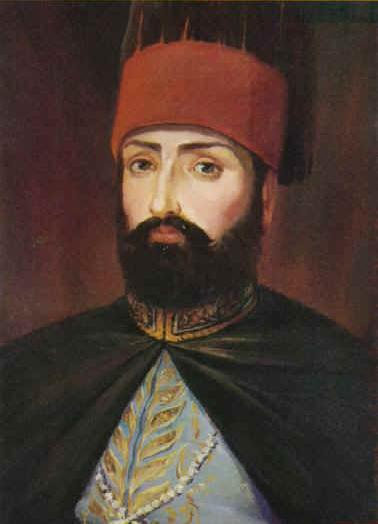
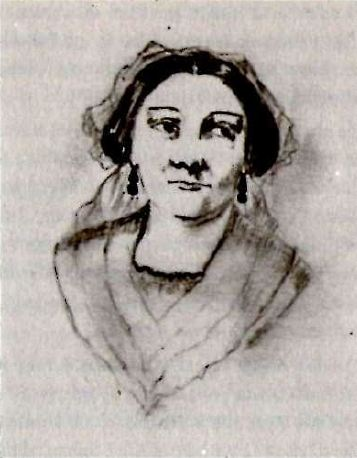
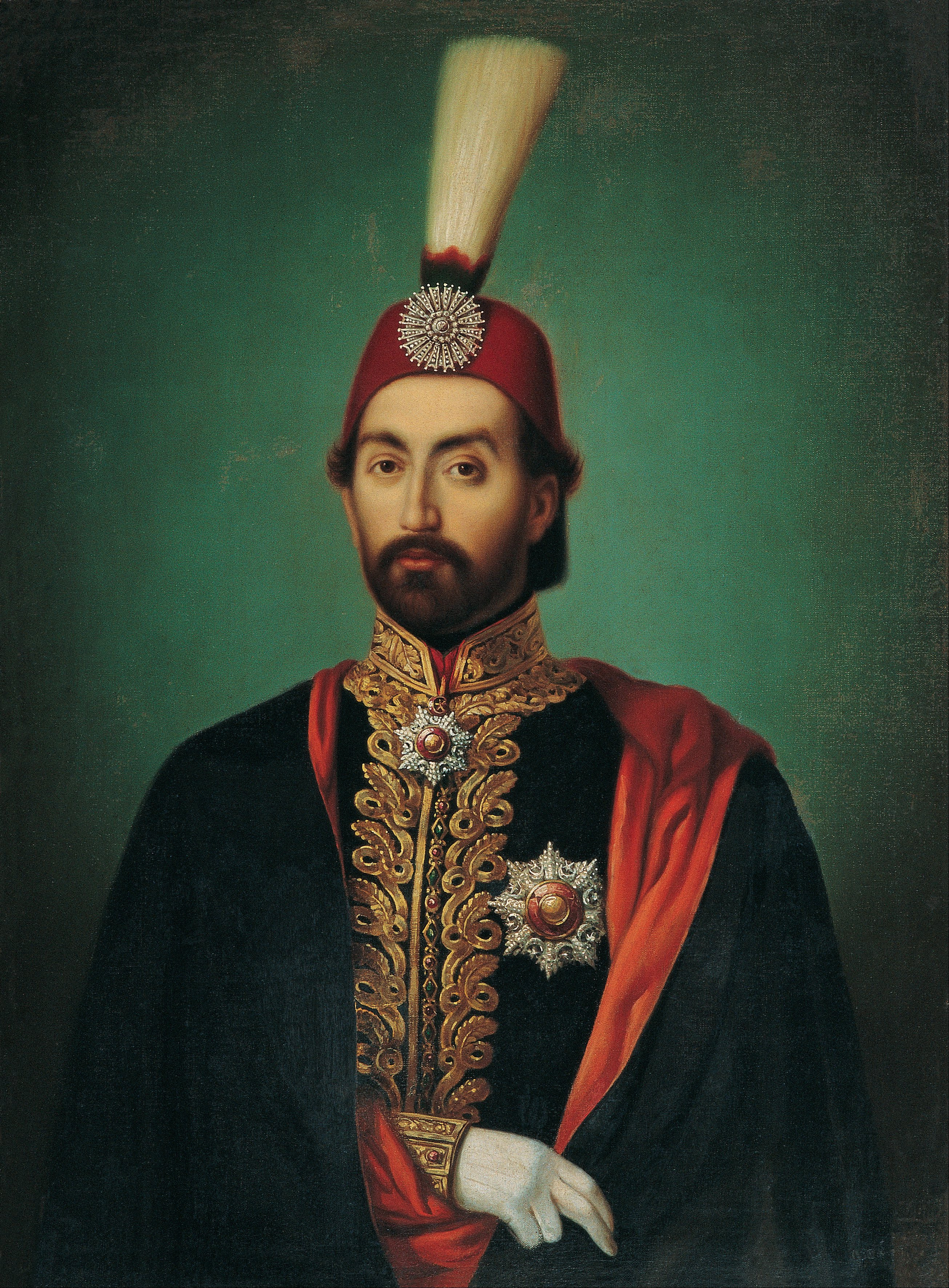
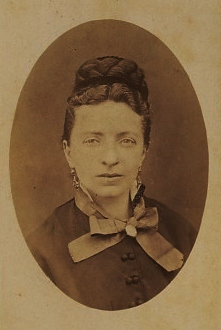
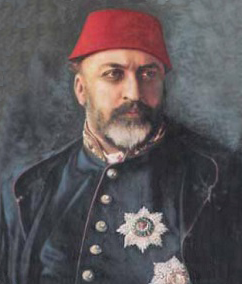
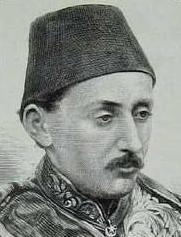
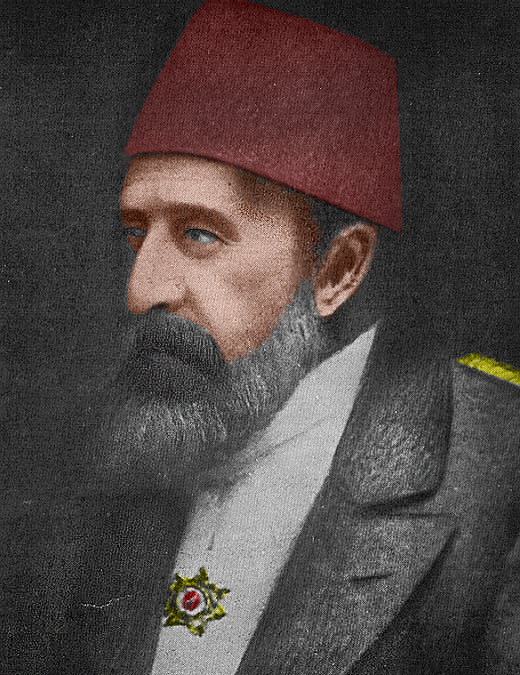
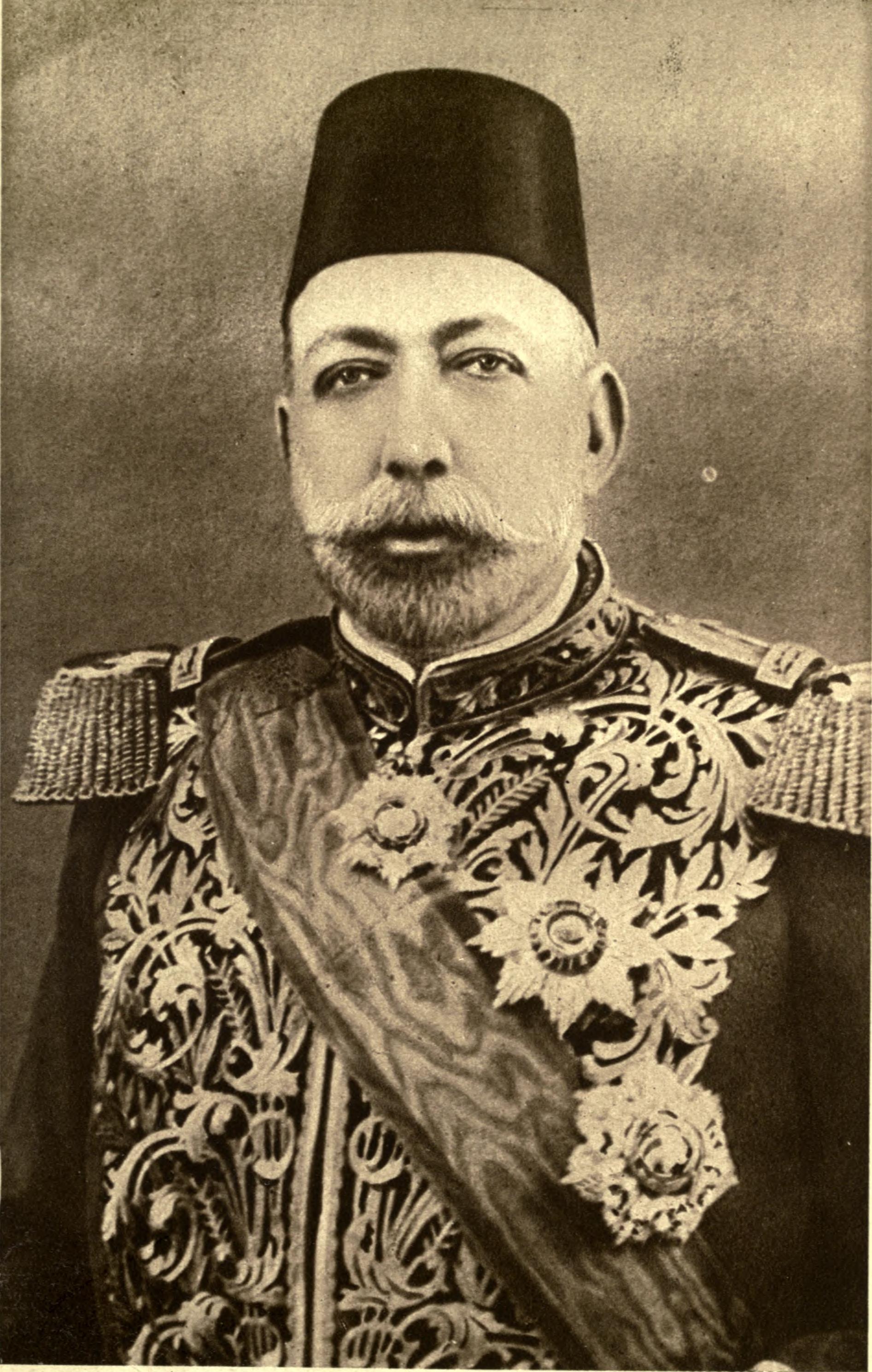
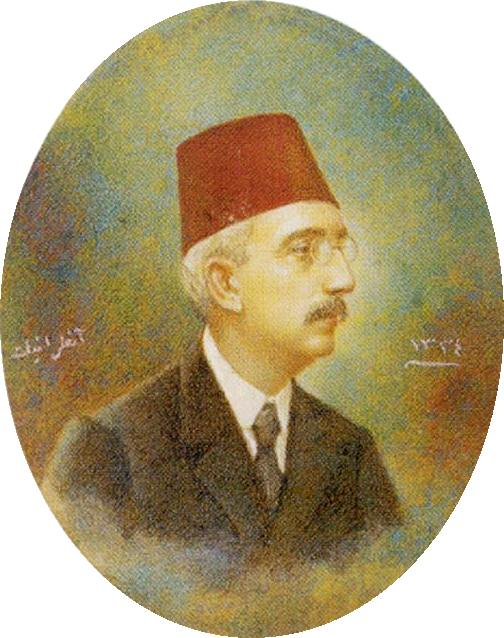
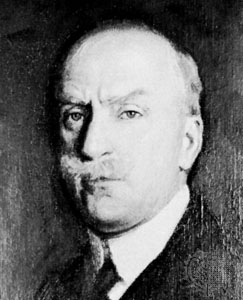
Hayme Hatun	Gündüz Alp
Halime Hatun	Ertuğrul Gazi d. c. 1280; Bey '
Malhun Hatun	Osman Gazi Possibly c. 1254/1255– 1323/1324; Bey r. c. 1280 – c. 1299; Sultan r. 1299–1323/1324
Nilüfer Hatun	Orhan Gazi d. 1362; Sultan r. 1323/1324–1362
Gülçiçek Hatun	Murad I 1326–1389; Sultan r. 1362–1389
Devlet Hatun	Bayezid I c. 1360–1403; Sultan r. 1389–1402
Emine Hatun	Mehmed I c. 1386–1421; Sultan r. 1413–1421
Hüma Hatun	Murad II 1404–1451; Sultan r. 1421–1444 r. 1446–1451
Emine Gülbahar Mükrime Hatun	Mehmed II ("the Conqueror") 1432–1481; Sultan r. 1444–1446 r. 1451–1481
Ayşe Gülbahar Hatun	Bayezid II 1448–1512; Sultan r. 1481–1512
Ayşe Hafsa Sultan	Selim I 1466–1520; Sultan r. 1512–1520; Caliph r. 1517–1520
Hürrem Sultan	Suleiman the Magnificent 1494–1566; Sultan and Caliph r. 1520–1566
Nurbanu Sultan	Selim II 1524–1574; Sultan and Caliph r. 1566–1574
Safiye Sultan	Murad III 1546–1595; Sultan and Caliph r. 1574–1595
Handan Sultan	Mehmed III 1566–1603; Sultan and Caliph r. 1595–1603	Halime Sultan
Mahfiruz Hatun	Ahmed I 1590–1617; Sultan and Caliph r. 1603–1617	Kösem Sultan	Mustafa I 1600-1639; Sultan and Caliph r. 1617–1618 r. 1622–1623
Osman II 1604–1622; Sultan and Caliph r. 1618–1622	Murad IV 1612–1640; Sultan and Caliph r. 1623–1640	Turhan Hatice Sultan	Ibrahim 1615–1648; Sultan and Caliph r. 1640–1648	Saliha Dilaşub Sultan	Hatice Muazzez Sultan
Emetullah Rabia Gülnuş Sultan	Mehmed IV 1642–1693; Sultan and Caliph r. 1648–1687	Suleiman II 1642–1691; Sultan and Caliph r. 1687–1691	Ahmed II 1643–1695; Sultan and Caliph r. 1691–1695
Saliha Sultan	Mustafa II 1664–1703; Sultan and Caliph r. 1695–1703	Şehsuvar Sultan	Mihrişah Kadın	Ahmed III 1673–1736; Sultan and Caliph r. 1703–1730	Şermi Kadın
Mahmud I 1696–1754; Sultan and Caliph r. 1730–1754	Osman III 1699–1757; Sultan and Caliph r. 1754–1757	Mihrişah Sultan	Mustafa III 1717–1757; Sultan and Caliph r. 1757–1774	Sineperver Sultan	Abdul Hamid I 1725–1789; Sultan and Caliph r. 1774–1789	Nakşidil Sultan
Selim III 1761–1808; Sultan and Caliph r. 1789–1807	Mustafa IV 1779–1808; Sultan and Caliph r. 1807–1808	Bezmiâlem Sultan	Mahmud II 1785–1839; Sultan and Caliph r. 1808–1839	Pertevniyal Sultan
Şevkefza	Gülnihal Tirimüjgan Kadın	Abdulmejid I 1823–1861; Sultan and Caliph r. 1839–1861	Gülcemal Kadın	Gülistu Kadın	Abdulaziz 1830–1876; Sultan and Caliph r. 1861–1876	Hayranidil Kadın
Murad V Sultan and Caliph r. 1876	Abdul Hamid II Sultan and Caliph r. 1876–1909	Mehmed V Sultan and Caliph r. 1909–1918	Mehmed VI Sultan and Caliph r. 1918–1922	Abdulmejid II Caliph r. 1922–1924

== See also ==
- Ottoman Empire
  - Ottoman dynasty
  - Ottoman history
- List of sultans of the Ottoman Empire
- Valide sultan, the title for the mother of the ruling Sultan
  - List of mothers of the Ottoman sultans
- Haseki sultan, the title for the wife or chief consort of the ruling Sultan
  - List of Ottoman imperial consorts
- Line of succession to the former Ottoman throne
