= Nazime Sultan =

Ottoman princess, daughter of Sultan Abdülaziz

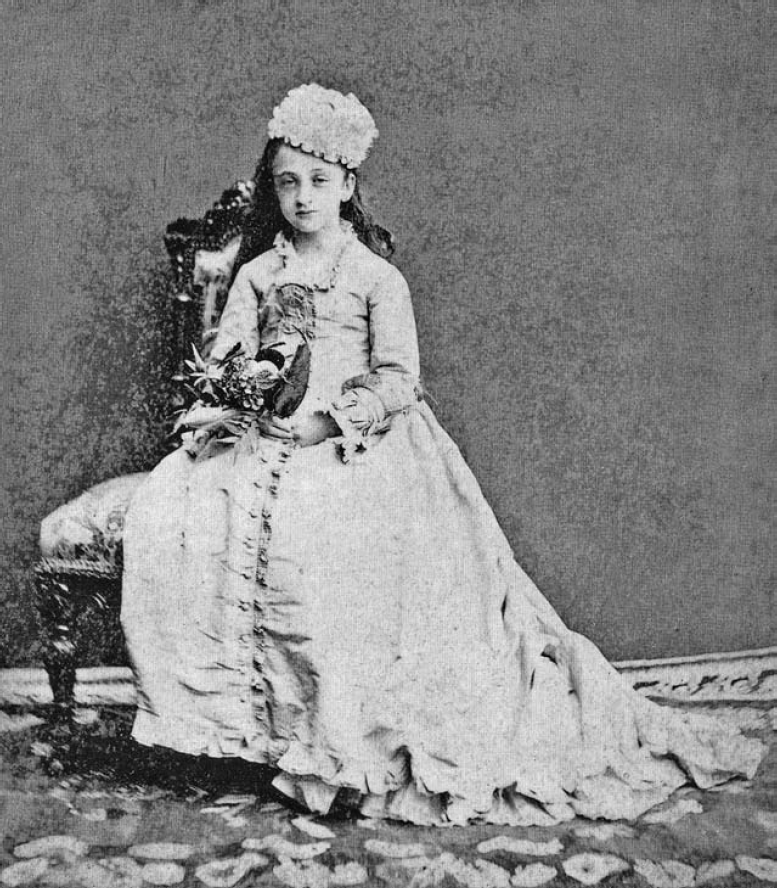
- Born: 25 February 1867; Dolmabahçe Palace, Constantinople, Ottoman Empire
- Died: 9 November 1947 (aged 80); Jounieh, Lebanon
- Burial: Cemetery of the Sulaymaniyya Takiyya, Damascus, Syria
- Spouse: Ali Halid Pasha (m. 1889–1947)
- Dynasty: Ottoman
- Father: Abdulaziz
- Mother: Hayranidil Kadın
- Religion: Sunni Islam

Nazime Sultan (Ottoman Turkish: ناظمه سلطان; 25 February 1867 – 9 November 1947) was an Ottoman princess, the daughter of Ottoman Sultan Abdulaziz and Hayranidil Kadın, and the full-sister of Ottoman Caliph Abdülmecid II.

== Early life ==
Nazime Sultan was born on 25 February 1867 at the Dolmabahçe Palace. Her father was Sultan Abdulaziz, and her mother was Hayranidil Kadın. She was the second daughter of her father and the first child of her mother. She was the elder full sister of the future Caliph Abdulmejid II, and a granddaughter of Mahmud II and Pertevniyal Sultan.

Her father, Abdulaziz, was deposed by his ministers on 30 May 1876, when his nephew Murad V became the Sultan. He was transferred to the Feriye Palace the next day. Her mother and other women of Abdulaziz's entourage didn't want to leave the Dolmabahçe Palace. So they were grabbed by hand and were sent out to the Feriye Palace. In the process, they were searched from head to toe and everything of value was taken from them. On 4 June 1876, Abdulaziz died under mysterious circumstances.

Nazime Sultan, then aged 10, continued to live in the Feriye Palace with her mother and eight-year-old brother. Recounting the event in an interview to Adil Sulh Bey years later, Nazime said:

Any claims that my father committed suicide are deceitful. I saw it with my own eyes that they murdered my father.

== Marriage ==
In 1889 Sultan Abdul Hamid II arranged her trousseaux and marriage together with her two sisters, Princesses Saliha Sultan and Esma Sultan, as well as his own daughter, Princess Zekiye Sultan. She married Ali Halid Pasha, the son of Ibrahim Derviş Pasha, on 20 April 1889 in the Yıldız Palace. He became a Damat. The couple were given a palace located at Kuruçeşme, known as Nazime Sultan Palace, as their residence. Here she had performers of religious music. She did not have any children.

== Philanthropy ==
Müdafaa-i Milliye Hanımlar Cemiyeti (Woman's Chapter of the Society of National Defense), an organization was established in September 1912 and went to Istanbul to take care of people wounded in the Balkan Wars. Upon its establishment in February 1913, the Women's Chapter of the Society of National Defense organized two meetings at the Darülfünun Lecture Hall under the auspices of Nazime and Nimet Mukhtar, daughter of Khedive Isma'il Pasha, which were led by Selma Hanım, sister of Ahmed Rıza Bey, a prominent CUP member and the head of the parliament.

In 1912, the "Hilal-i Ahmer Centre for Women" was organized within the "Ottoman Hilal-i Ahmer Association", a foundation established in 1877 to provide medical care in Istanbul and surrounding communities. In May 1915, during the Gallipoli Campaign, as the member of this organization, Nazime donated 50 Turkish liras to a hospital to purchase beds and other goods for soldiers.

== Exile ==
Upon the exile of the imperial family in 1924, Nazime and her husband settled in Jounieh, Lebanon. Here the two lived in a large mansion surrounded by a garden.

When Dürrüşehvar Sultan married Prince Azam Jah, the eldest son and heir of the last Nizam of Hyderabad, Osman Ali Khan, Asif Jah VII, in 1932, Nazime Sultan gave her a diamond tiara. To Neslişah Sultan, she offered a beautiful bracelet embossed with three diamonds, when she married Prince Mohamed Abdel Moneim, son of Egypt's last Khedive Abbas Hilmi II in 1940.

According to Neslişah Sultan, she was tiny, rather ugly, with large lips like her father's, but quite impressive.

== Death ==
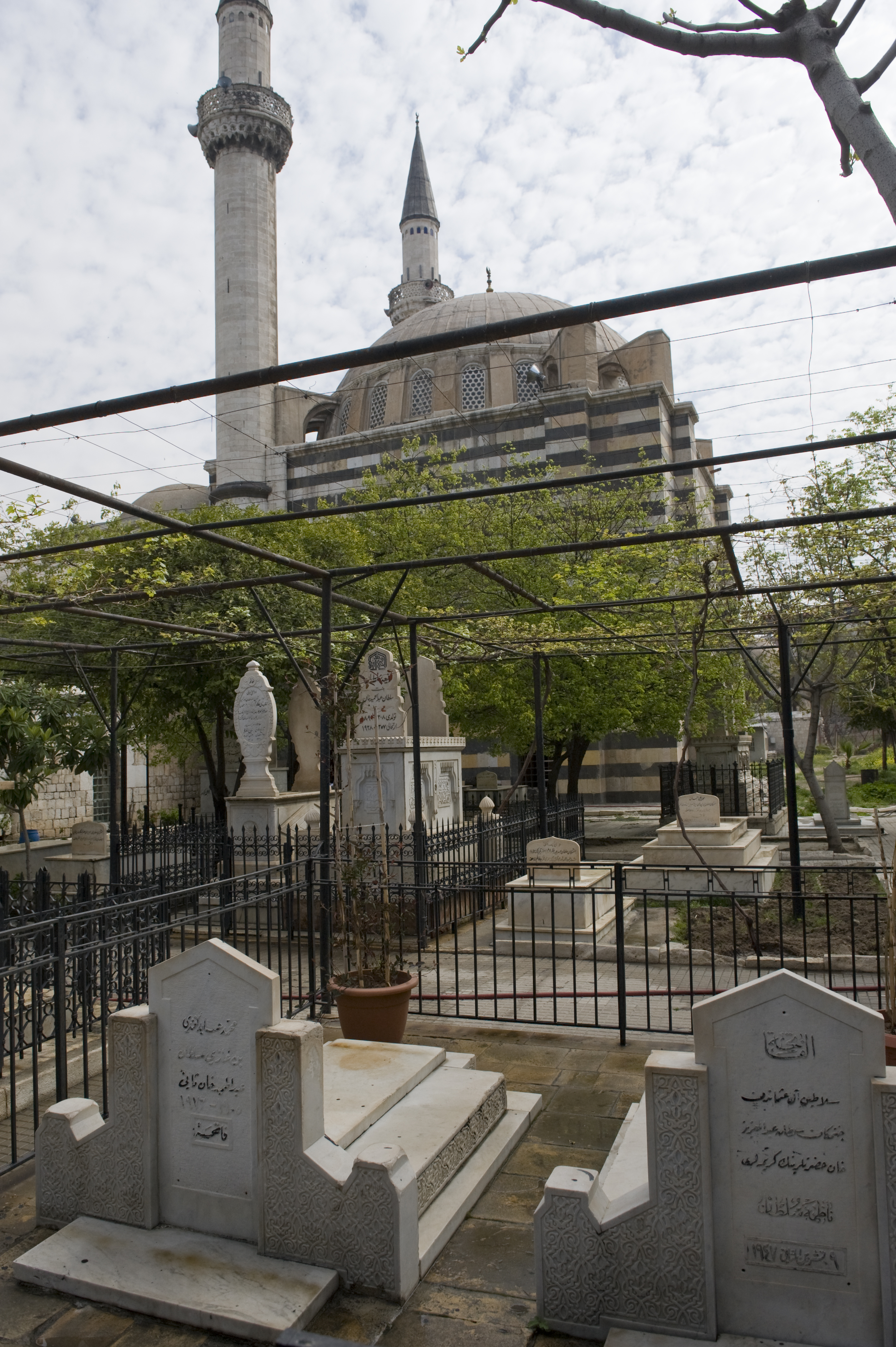
The grave of Nazime Sultan (bottom right)

Nazime died on 9 November 1947 in Jounieh, Lebanon. She was the last surviving child of Abdulaziz. She was buried in the cemetery of the Sulaymaniyya Takiyya, Damascus, Syria. Her husband outlived her by one year and died in 1948 in Mecca, Saudi Arabia.

== Honours ==
Styles of Nazime Sultan
- Reference style: Her Imperial Highness
- Spoken style: Your Imperial Highness

- Order of the House of Osman
- Order of the Medjidie, Jeweled
- Order of Charity, 1st Class

== See also ==
- List of Ottoman princesses

== Sources ==
- Brookes, Douglas Scott (2010). The Concubine, the Princess, and the Teacher: Voices from the Ottoman Harem. University of Texas Press. ISBN 978-0-292-78335-5.
- Sakaoğlu, Necdet (2008). Bu mülkün kadın sultanları: Vâlide sultanlar, hâtunlar, hasekiler, kadınefendiler, sultanefendiler. Oğlak Yayıncılık. ISBN 978-9-753-29623-6.
- Uluçay, Mustafa Çağatay (2011). Padişahların kadınları ve kızları. Ankara: Ötüken. ISBN 978-9-754-37840-5.
