= Circassian beauty =

Ethnic stereotype

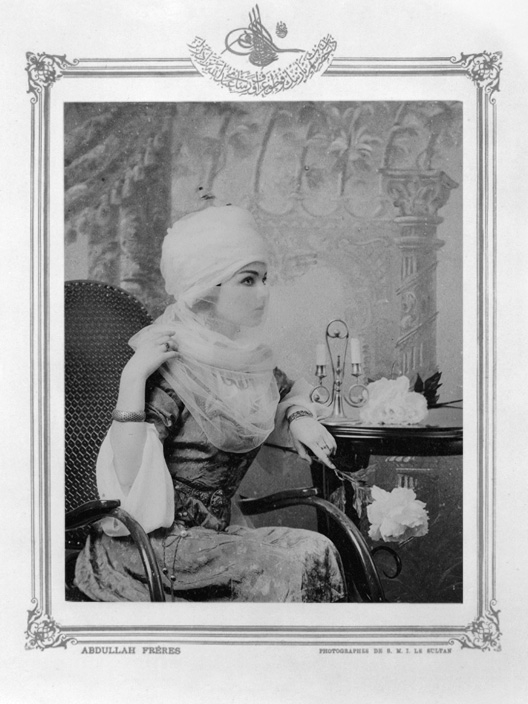
A Circassian noblewoman in the 19th century. Photograph taken by Abdullah Frères.

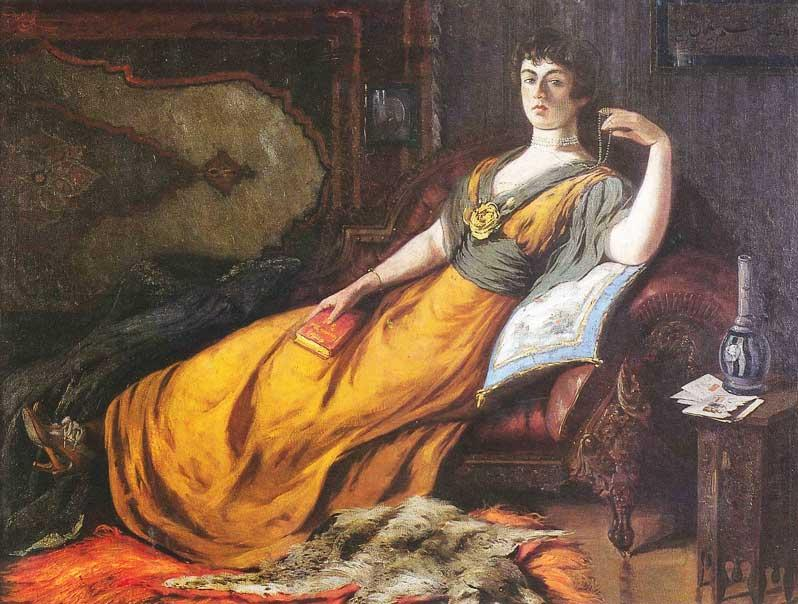
A painting by Ottoman Caliph Abdulmejid II depicting his own Circassian consort Şehsuvar Kadın, 1898

The concept of Circassian beauty is an ethnic stereotype of the Circassian people. A fairly extensive literary history suggests that Circassian women were thought to be unusually attractive, spirited, smart, and elegant. Therefore, they were seen as mentally and physically desirable for men, although most Circassians traditionally refused to marry non-Circassians in accordance with Adyghe Xabze. A smaller but similar literary history also exists for Circassian men, who were thought to be especially handsome.

There are folk songs in various languages all around the Middle East and the Balkans describing the unusual beauty of Circassian women. This trend popularised greatly after the Circassian genocide, although the reputation of Circassian women dates back to the Late Middle Ages, when the Circassian coast was frequented by Italian traders from Genoa. This reputation was further reinforced by the Italian banker and politician Cosimo de' Medici (the founder of the Medici dynasty in the Republic of Florence), who fathered an illegitimate son with his Venice-based Circassian slave Maddalena. Additionally, the Circassian women who lived as slaves in the Ottoman harem, the Safavid harem, and the Qajar harem also developed a reputation as extremely beautiful, which then became a common trope of Orientalism throughout the Western world.

As a result of this reputation, Circassians in Europe and Northern America were often characterised as ideals of feminine beauty in poetry and art. Consequently, from the 18th century onward, cosmetic products were often advertised by using the word "Circassian" in the title or by claiming that the product was based on substances used by women in Circassia.

Many consorts and mothers of the Ottoman Sultans were ethnic Circassians, including, but not limited to: Mahidevran Hatun, Şevkefza Sultan, Rahime Perestu Sultan, Tirimujgan Kadin, Nükhetsezâ Hanim, Hümaşah Sultan, Bedrifelek Kadin, Bidar Kadin, Kamures Kadin, Servetseza Kadin, Bezmiara Kadin, Düzdidil Hanim, Hayranidil Kadin, Meyliservet Kadin, Mihrengiz Kadin, Neşerek Kadin, Nurefsun Kadin, Reftarıdil Kadin, Şayan Kadin, Gevherriz Hanim, Ceylanyar Hanim, Dilfirib Kadin, Nalanıdil Hanim, Nergizev Hanim, and Şehsuvar Kadın. It is likely that many other concubines, whose origin is not recorded, were also of Circassian ethnicity. The "golden age" of Circassian beauty may be considered to be between the 1770s, when the Russian Empire seized the Crimean Khanate and cut off the Black Sea slave trade, which increased the demand for Circassian women in Muslim harems; and the 1860s, when the Russian Empire perpetrated the Circassian genocide and destroyed the Circassians' ancestral homeland during the Russo-Circassian War, creating the modern-day Circassian diaspora. After 1854, almost all concubines in the Ottoman harem were of Circassian origin; the Circassians had been expelled from Russian-controlled lands in the 1860s, and the impoverished refugee parents sold their daughters in a trade that was tolerated despite being formally banned.

"Circassian Beauties" became a mainstay of sideshows until the late 19th century, attracting American audiences fascinated by the "exotic Orient". In the 1860s, the American showman P. T. Barnum exhibited women who he claimed were Circassian beauties. They had a distinctively curly style of big hair, which had no precedent in earlier portrayals of Circassians, but which was soon copied by other female performers, who became known as "moss-haired girls" in the United States. This hairstyle was a sort of exhibit's trademark and was achieved by washing the hair of women in beer, drying it, and then teasing it. It is not clear why Barnum chose this hairstyle; it may have been a reference to the standard Circassian fur hat, rather than the hair.

There were also several classical Turkish music pieces and poems praising the beauty of the Circassian ethnic group, such as "Lepiska Saçlı Çerkes" (transl. "Straight, flaxen-haired Circassian"); the word "Lepiska" refers to long and blonde hair that is straight, as if it was flat-ironed.

== Circassian slave trade ==
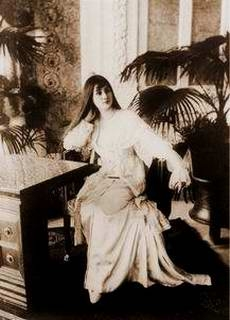
Ikbal Hanim, a Circassian woman who was the first wife of Abbas II of Egypt between 1895 and 1910.

From the Middle Ages until the 20th century, Circassian women were a major target for sexual slavery in the harems of the Islamic Middle East. In the Middle Ages, the Black Sea slave traders bought slaves from a number of different ethnic groups in the Caucasus, such as Abkhazians, Mingrelians and Circassians.

In the context of the Circassian slave trade, the term Circassians did not necessarily refer to ethnic Circassians, but was used as an umbrella term for a number of different ethnicities from the Caucasus region, such as Georgians, Adyge, and Abkhazians, in the same fashion as the term "Abbyssinians" was used as a term also for African slaves who were not from Abyssinia.

The slave trade with Circassians from Caucasus had been a big slave route already during the Italian slave trade period, but during the Crimean slave trade it came to be a permanent luxury slave trade route providing elite slaves to the Ottoman Empire and the Middle East.

During the early modern Crimean slave trade, the trade of Circassians from the Caucasus expanded and developed in to what was termed a luxury slave trade route, providing elite slaves to the Ottoman Empire and the Middle East. The Crimean slave trade was one of the biggest suppliers of concubines (female sex slaves) to the Ottoman Imperial Harem, and virgin slave girls (normally arriving as children) were given to the Sultan from local statesmen, family members, grand dignitaries and provincial governors, and particularly from the Crimean Khan; the Ottoman Sultan Ahmed III received one hundred Circassian virgin girl slaves as presents upon his accession to the throne. When the Crimean slave trade was ended with the Annexation of the Crimean Khanate by the Russian Empire in the 18th century, the trade of Circassians was redirected from Crimea and went directly from the Caucasus to the Ottoman Empire, developing in to a separate slave trade which continued until the 20th century.

The Circassian slave trade was heavily (though not entirely) focused on slave-girls. In the Islamic empires of the Middle East, enslaved African black women – trafficked via the Trans-Saharan slave trade, the Red Sea slave trade and the Indian Ocean slave trade – were primarily used as domestic house slaves and not exclusively for sexual slavery. Conversely, white women, trafficked via the Black Sea slave trade, were highly sought after by Middle Eastern Muslim slave traders to be used as concubines (sex slaves) or wives for wealthy elites. It was commonly known that Circassian girls were mainly bought to become wives or concubines to rich men, which made the Circassian slave trade to be viewed as a form of marriage market, and it was commonly claimed in these regions that the Circassian girls were in fact eager to be enslaved by the Muslims and asked their parents to sell them to the traders because it was the only way for them to enhance their class status.

There was a tendency of apologetism by the Ottomans to claim that slavery was beneficial to the Circassians, since it delivered them from "primitivism to civilisation, from poverty and need to prosperity and happiness", and that they became slaves willingly: "Circassians came to Istanbul willingly 'to become wives of the Sultan and the Pachas, and the young men to become Beys and Pachas'".

The New York Daily Times reported on August 6, 1856:

"There has been lately an unusually large number of Circassians going about the streets of Constantinople. [...] They are here as slave dealers, charged with the disposal of the numerous parcels of Circassian girls that have been for some time pouring into this market. [...] ...never, perhaps, at any former period, was white human flesh so cheap as it is at this moment.In former times a “good middling” Circassian girl was thought very cheap at 100 pounds, but at the present moment the same description of goods may be had for 5 pounds! [...] Formerly a Circassian slave girl was pretty sure of being bought into a good family, where not only good treatment, but often rank and fortune awaited her; but at present low rates she may be taken by any huxter who never thought of keeping a slave before. Another evil is that the temptation to possess a Circassian girl at such low prices is so great in the minds of the Turks that many who cannot afford to keep several slaves have been sending their blacks to market, in order to make room for a newly-purchased white girl."

There was a greater reluctance from Ottoman authorities to prohibit the Circassian slave trade than the African slave trade, because the Circassian slave trade was regarded as in effect a marriage market, and it continued until the end of the Ottoman Empire after World War I.

Girls from Caucasus and the Circassian colonies in Anatolia were still trafficked to other parts of the Middle East, especially the Arab world, in the 1920s; in 1928, at least 60 white slave girls were discovered for sexual purposes in Kuwait. In the 1940s, it was reported that Baluchi girls were shipped via Oman to the rest of the Arabian Peninsula, where they were popular as concubines since Caucasian girls were no longer available, and were sold for $350–450 in Mecca. The legal sex slave trade to the Middle East was ended with the abolition of slavery in Saudi Arabia, slavery in Dubai and slavery in Oman in the 1960s.

== Literary allusions ==
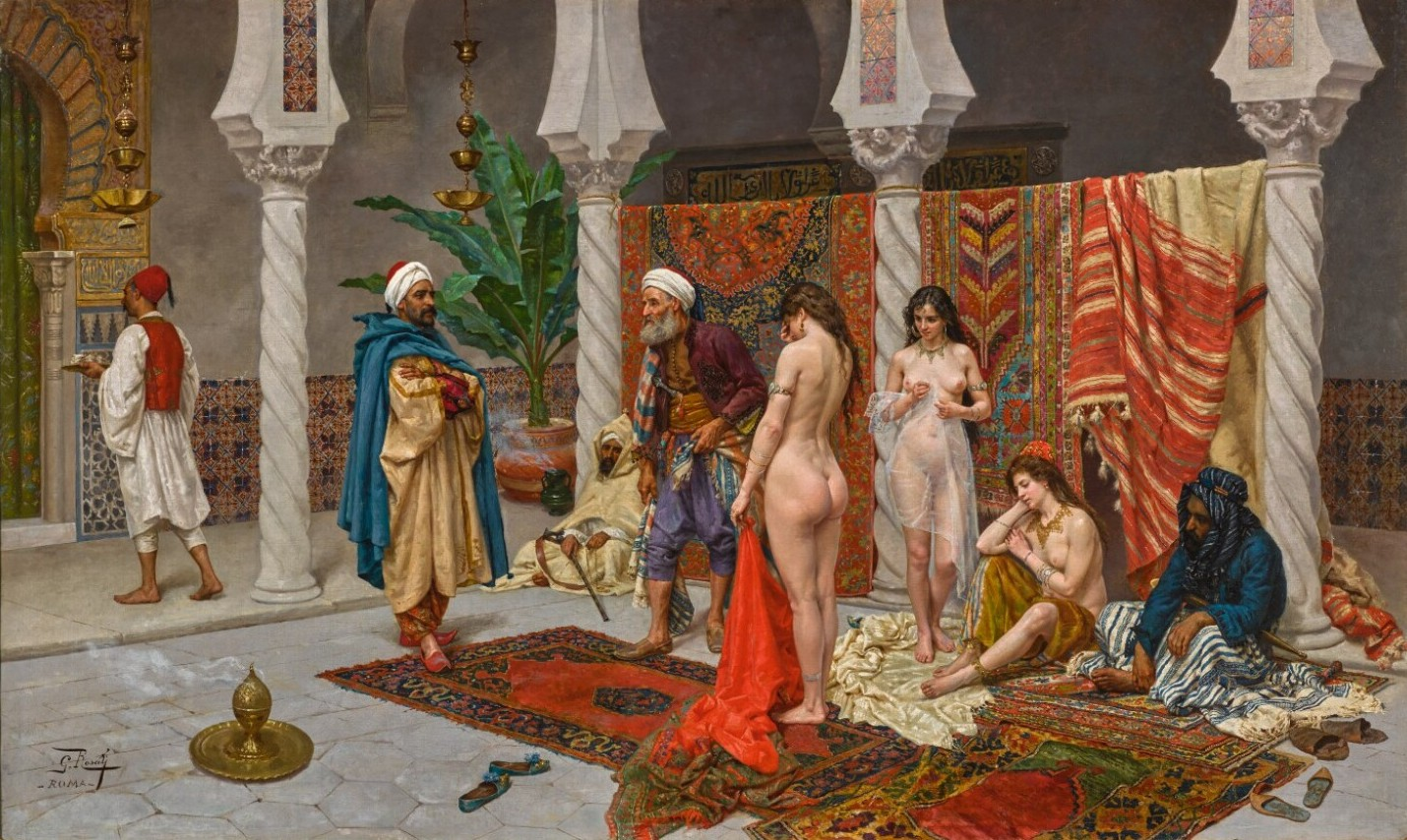
Inspection of New Arrivals, painted by Giulio Rosati (c. 1857–1917)

The legend of Circassian women in the western world was enhanced in 1734, when, in his Letters on the English, Voltaire alludes to the beauty of Circassian women:

The Circassians are poor, and their daughters are beautiful, and indeed it is in them they chiefly trade. They furnish with those beauties the seraglio of the Turkish Sultan, of the Persian Sophy, and of all of those who are wealthy enough to purchase and maintain such precious merchandise. These maidens are very honourably and virtuously instructed how to fondle and caress men; are taught dances of a very polite and effeminate kind; and how to heighten by the most voluptuous artifices the pleasures of their disdainful masters for whom they are designed.

— Letter XI, On Inoculation.

Their beauty is mentioned in Henry Fielding's Tom Jones (1749), in which Fielding remarked, "How contemptible would the brightest Circassian beauty, drest in all the jewels of the Indies, appear to my eyes!"

Similar claims about Circassian women appear in Lord Byron's Don Juan (1818–1824), in which the tale of a slave auction is told:

Some went off dearly; fifteen hundred dollars
For one Circassian, a sweet girl, were given,
Warranted virgin. Beauty's brightest colours
Had decked her out in all the hues of heaven.
Her sale sent home some disappointed bawlers,
Who bade on till the hundreds reached the eleven,
But when the offer went beyond, they knew
'Twas for the Sultan, and at once withdrew.

— Don Juan, canto IV, verse 114

The legend of Circassian women was also repeated by legal theorist Gustav Hugo, who wrote that "Even beauty is more likely to be found in a Circassian slave girl than in a beggar girl", referring to the fact that even a slave has some security and safety, but a "free" beggar has none. Hugo's comment was later condemned by Karl Marx in The Philosophical Manifesto of the Historical School of Law (1842) on the grounds that it excused slavery. Mark Twain reported in The Innocents Abroad (1869) that "Circassian and Georgian girls are still sold in Constantinople, but not publicly."

American travel author and diplomat Bayard Taylor in 1862 claimed that, "So far as female beauty is concerned, the Circassian women have no superiors. They have preserved in their mountain home the purity of the Grecian models, and still display the perfect physical loveliness, whose type has descended to us in the Venus de' Medici."

== Circassian features ==
=== Circassian women ===
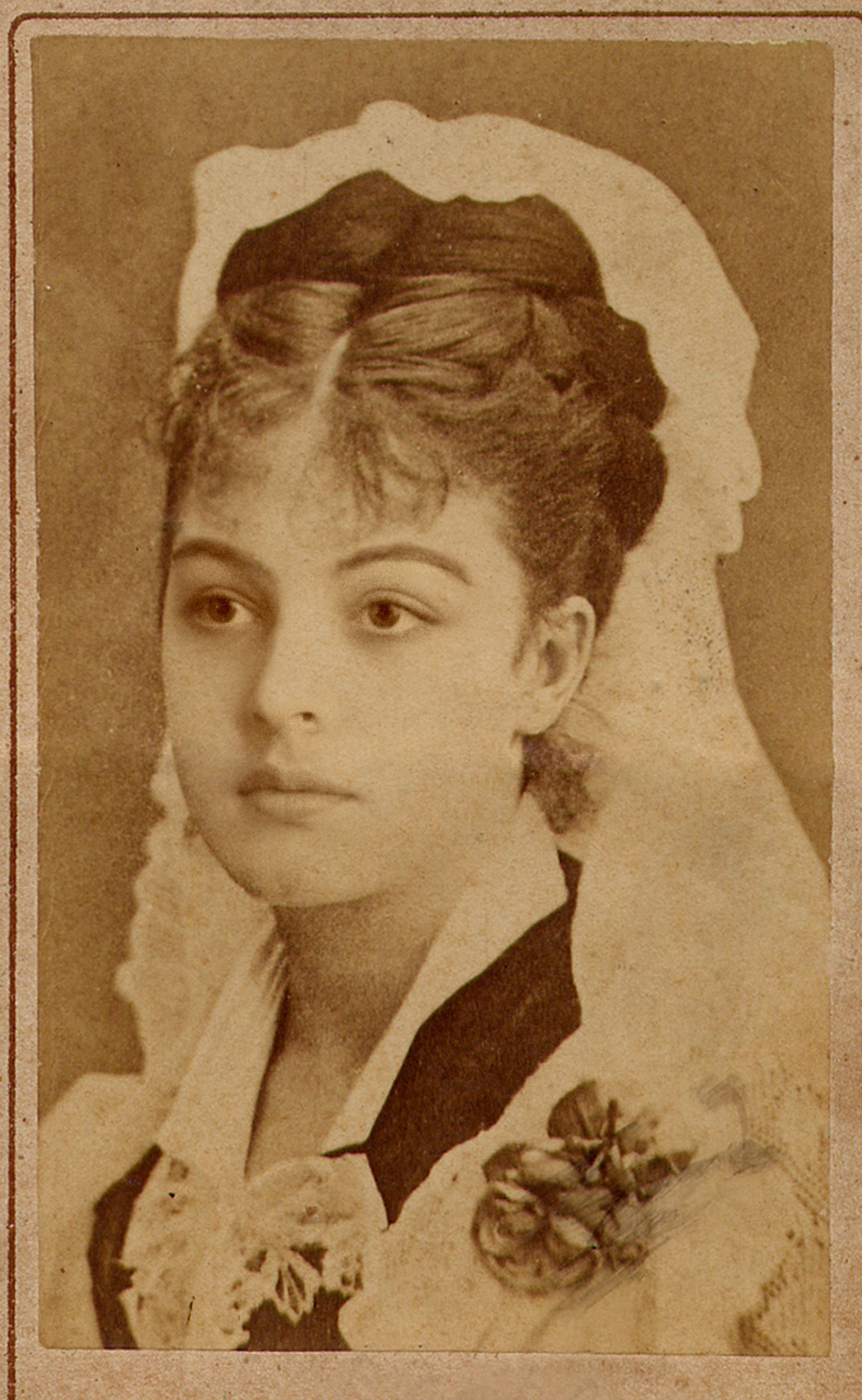
A Circassian woman, date unknown

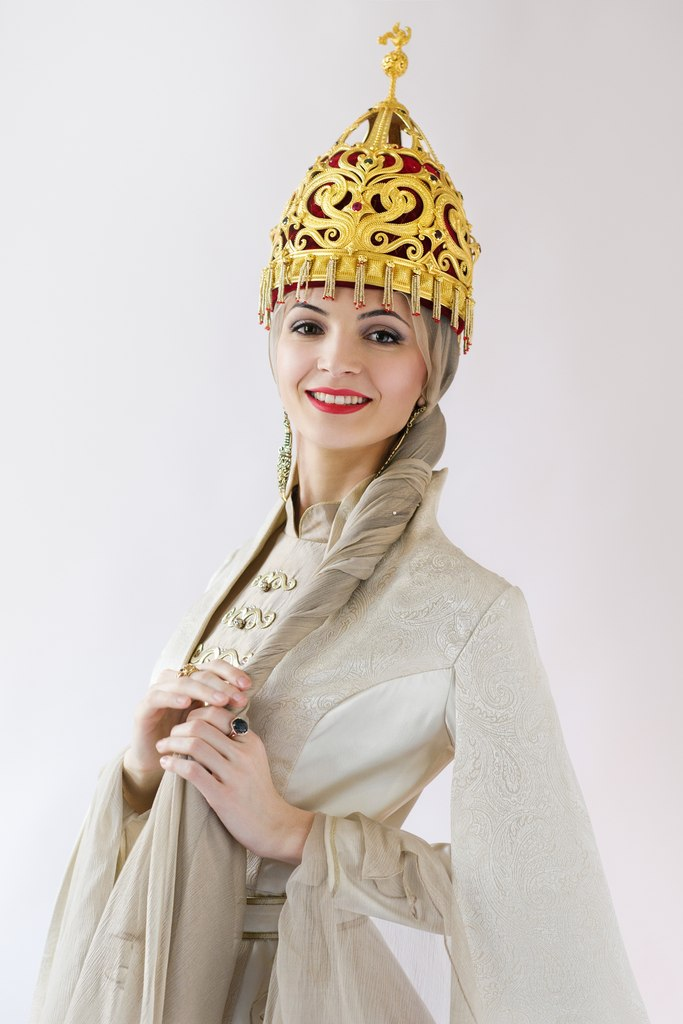
Bella Kukan, who won Miss Circassia 2013 in Maykop, Russia.

An anthropological literary suggests that Circassians were best characterized by what was called "rosy pale" or "translucent white skin". While most Circassian tribes were famous for abundance of fair or dark blond and red hair combined with greyish-blue or green eyes, many also had the pairing of very dark hair with very light complexions, a typical feature of peoples of the Caucasus. Many of the Circassian women in the Ottoman harem were described as having "green eyes and long, dark blond hair, pale skin of translucent white colour, thin waist, slender body structure, and very good-looking hands and feet". The fact that Circassian women were traditionally encouraged to wear corsets in order to keep their posture straight might have shaped their wasp waist as a result. In the late 18th century, it was claimed by Western European couturiers that "the Circassian Corset is the only one which displays, without indelicacy, the shape of the bosom to the greatest possible advantage; gives a width to the chest which is equally conducive to health and elegance of appearance".

It has also been suggested that a lithe and erect physique were favored for Circassians, and many villages had large numbers of healthy elderly people, many over a hundred years of age.

Maturin Murray Ballou described Circassians as being of the "fair and rosy-cheeked race", and "with a form of ravishing loveliness, large and lustrous eyes, and every belonging that might go to make up a Venus".

In Henry Lindlahr's words in the early 20th century, "Blue-eyed Caucasian regiments today form the cream of the Sultan's army. Circassian beauties are admired for their abundant and luxuriant yellow hair and blue eyes."

In his book A Year Among the Circassians, John Augustus Longworth describes a Circassian girl of typical Circassian features as the following:

She had regular and pretty features, blue eyes, and fair complexion; her hair was of a light auburn colour, and hung in a profusion of braided tresses over her shoulders, from a bonnet of scarlet cloth, trimmed and crossed with broad silver lace, not unlike the Albanian skull-cap. She was tall, and well, though slightly, shaped; and held herself, like all Circassians, men or women, very erect.

It is also understood from the memoirs of Princess Emily Ruete, a half-Circassian and half-Omani herself, that Circassian women, who were bought in Constantinople and brought via the Circassian slave trade to slavery in Zanzibar for the harem of Zanzibari Said bin Sultan, Sultan of Muscat and Oman, were envied by their rivals who considered Circassians to be of the "hateful race of blue-eyed cats".

At Bet il Sahel there was much more luxury and grand style than at Bet il Mtoni. The handsome and graceful Circassian women were much more numerous than at Bet il Mtoni, where my mother and her lady friend Medîne were the only members of this race. Here the majority of the women were Circassian, who without any doubt are much more distinguished in appearance. ... This natural superiority was the cause of a good deal of ill-will and envy. One Circassian woman, favoured with an aristocratic appearance, was avoided and even hated by the chocolate-coloured African women through no fault of hers, but simply because she looked majestic. Under these circumstances it was bound to happen that occasionally a kind of ridiculous "racism" broke out among my brothers and sisters. ... We, the children of Circassian women, were usually called "cats" by those of our brothers and sisters who had African blood in their veins, because some of us had the misfortune of possessing: blue eyes. Derisively they called us "Highness", a proof of how annoyed they were about us having been born with lighter skin. My father was of course never forgiven the fact that he had chosen his favourite children Sharîfe and Chole—both by Circassian mothers, Sharîfe even being blue-eyed—from the hateful race of "cats".

Regarding one of her half-sisters who was also from a Circassian mother, Princess Ruete of Zanzibar mentions that "The daughter of a Circassian was a dazzling beauty with the complexion of a German blonde. Besides, she possessed a sharp intellect, which made her into a faithful advisor of my father's."

The characteristics of Circassian and Georgian women were further articulated in 1839 by the author Emma Reeve who, as stated by Joan DelPlato, differentiated "between 'the blond Circassians' who are 'indolent and graceful, their voices low and sweet' and what she calls the slightly darker-skinned Georgians who are 'more animated' and have more 'intelligence and vivacity than their delicate rivals'".

Similar descriptions of the Circassian women appear in Florence Nightingale's travel journal where Nightingale called Circassians "the most graceful and the most sensual-looking creatures I ever saw".

According to the feminist Harriet Martineau, Circassians trafficked to slavery in Egypt were the only saving virtue of the Egyptian harem where these Circassian mothers produced the finest children and if they were to be excluded from the harem, the upper class in Egypt would be doomed. The sex slave trade of "white women" (normally Circassians) to the Egyptian harems was explicitly banned after pressure by the British in the Anglo-Egyptian Slave Trade Convention of 1884.

In parts of Europe and North America where blond hair was more common, the pairing of extremely white skin with very dark hair also present among some Circassians was exalted, even in Russia which was at war with the Circassians; Semyon Bronevskii exalted Circassian women for having light skin, dark brown hair, dark eyes and "the lineaments of the face of the Ancient Greek". In the United States, the girls disguised as "Circassians" exhibited by Phineas T. Barnum were in fact Catholic Irish girls from Lower Manhattan.

=== Circassian men ===
Circassian men were also exalted for their beauty, manliness, and bravery in Western Europe, in a way Caucasus historian Charles King calls "homoerotic". In Scotland, in 1862, Circassian chiefs arrived to advocate their cause against Russia and to persuade Britain to stop the actions of the Russian army at that time, and upon the arrival of two Circassian leaders, Hadji Hayder Hassan and Kustan Ogli Ismael, the Dundee Advertiser reported that

the Chiefs are two remarkable looking men. Their imposing bearing, their romantic dress ... and their natural dignity of mien, stamp them as very superior ... Raven haired, black-bearded, broad-browed, with wide springing eyebrows of sooty black ... these bronzed and armed children of the mountains tend to put us out of love with our own specimens of men, and suggests thoughts not complementary to the types of manhood which, in this country, they are surrounded.

=== Pseudoscientific explanations for fair skin ===
During the 19th century, various Western intellectuals offered pseudoscientific explanations for the light complexion present among Circassians. The doctor of medicine Hugh Williamson, a signatory to the United States Constitution, argued that the reason for the extreme whiteness of the Circassian and coastal Celto-Germanic peoples can be explained by the geographical location of these people's ancestral homelands which lie in high latitudes ranging from 45° to 55° N near a sea or ocean where westerlies prevail from the west towards the east.

There are not any people, on the old continent, perfectly fair, except those who live in high latitudes, where the westerly winds come from the sea, at no great distance, so tempered as not to be very sharp nor very dry. This rule applies to Great Britain and Ireland, to the Germans, Danes, Swedes, and Circassians; but going to the eastward in the same latitude, as we depart from the ocean or the Black Sea, having more dry land to the windward, by which the air is charged with sun-dry exhalations, the skin changes its colour; it ceases to be perfectly fair.

According to Voltaire, the practice of inoculation (see also variolation, an early form of vaccination) resulted in the Circassians having skin clean of smallpox scars:

The Circassian women have, from time immemorial, communicated the small-pox to their children when not above six months old by making an incision in the arm, and by putting into this incision a pustule, taken carefully from the body of another child. This pustule produces the same effect in the arm it is laid in as yeast in a piece of dough; it ferments, and diffuses through the whole mass of blood the qualities with which it is impregnated. The pustules of the child in whom the artificial small-pox has been thus inoculated are employed to communicate the same distemper to others.

— Voltaire, On Inoculation

== Pseudoscientific racialist theories ==
By the early 19th century, Circassians were associated with theories of racial hierarchy, which elevated the Caucasus region as the source of the purest examples of the "white race", which was named the Caucasian race after the area by German physiologist and anthropologist Johann Friedrich Blumenbach. Blumenbach theorised that the Circassians were the closest to God's original model of humanity, and thus "the purest and most beautiful whites were the Circassians". This fuelled the idea of female Circassian beauty.

In 1873, the decade after the expulsion of Circassians from the Caucasus where only a minority of them live today, it was argued that "the Caucasian Race receives its name from the Caucasus, the abode of the Circassians who are said to be the handsomest and best-formed nation, not only of this race, but of the whole human family." Another anthropologist, William Guthrie, distinguished the Caucasian race and the "Circassians who are admired for their beauty" in particular by their oval form of their head, straight nose, thin lips, vertically-placed teeth, facial angle from 80 to 90 degrees that he calls the most developed one, and their regular features overall, which "causes them to be considered as the most handsome and agreeable".

American travel writer Bayard Taylor observed Circassian women during his trip to the Ottoman Empire and argued that "the Circassian face is a pure oval; the forehead is low and fair, an excellent thing in woman, and the skin of an ivory whiteness, except the faint pink of the cheeks and the ripe, roseate stain of the lips."

Circassians are depicted in images of harems at this time through these ideologies of racial hierarchy. English painter John Frederick Lewis's The Harem portrays Circassians as the dominant mistresses of the harem, who look down on other women, as implied in the review of the painting in The Art Journal, which described it as follows:

It represents the interior of a harem and slaves at Cairo, wherein is seated in luxurious ease a young man, attired in the excess of Moslem fashion. Near him, and reclining upon cushions, are two European Circassian women, whom also dressed in the extremity of Egyptian Oriental taste of Cairo ... On the right is seen a tall Nubian eunuch, who removes from the shoulders of an African Black slave the shawl by which she had been covered, in order to show her to the master of the harem; this figure with her high shoulders and the characteristics of her features, is a most successful national impersonation. The Circassian women look languidly to the African with an expression of supreme contempt, which is responded to by a sneer on the face of the Nubian eunuch.

Orientalizing paintings of nudes were also sometimes exhibited as "Circassians".

The Circassians became major news during the Caucasian War, in which Russia conquered the North Caucasus, displacing large numbers of Circassians southwards. In 1856 The New York Times published a report entitled "Horrible Traffic in Circassian Women – Infanticide in Turkey", asserting that a consequence of the Russian conquest of the Caucasus was an excess of beautiful Circassian women on the Constantinople slave market, and that this was causing prices of slaves in general to plummet. The story drew on ideas of racial hierarchy, stating that:

The temptation to possess a Circassian girl at such low prices is so great in the minds of the Turks that many who cannot afford to keep several slaves have been sending their blacks to market, in order to make room for a newly purchased white girl.

The article also claimed that children born to the "inferior" black concubines were being killed. This story drew widespread attention to the area, as did later conflicts.

At the same time writers and illustrators were also creating images depicting the authentic costumes and people of the Caucasus. Francis Davis Millet depicted Circassian women during his 1877 coverage of the Russo-Turkish war, specifying local costume and hairstyle.

== Advertising of beauty products ==
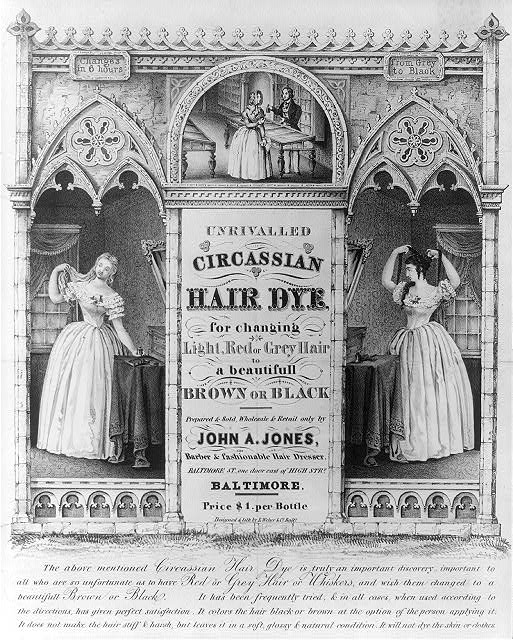
A poster in Baltimore advertising hair dye using the Circassian beauty stereotype in the United States. Each bottle sold for $1 in 1843, which is equivalent to about $40 in 2022.

An advertisement from 1782 titled "Bloom of Circassia" makes clear that it was by then well established "that the Circassians are the most beautiful Women in the World", but goes on to reveal that they "derive not all their Charms from Nature". They used a concoction supposedly extracted from a vegetable native to Circassia. Knowledge of this "Liquid Bloom" had been brought back by a "well-regarded gentleman" who had traveled and lived in the region. It "instantly gives a Rosy Hue to the Cheeks", a "lively and animated Bloom of Rural Beauty" that would not disappear in perspiration or handkerchiefs.

In 1802 "the Balm of Mecca" was also marketed as being used by Circassians: "This delicate as well as fragrant composition has been long celebrated as the summit of cosmetics by all the Circassian and Georgian women in the seraglio of the Grand Sultan". It claims that the product was endorsed by Lady Mary Wortley Montague, who stated that it was very helpful "for removing those sebacious impurities so noxious to beauty". The article continues:

Any lady must be as great an Infidel as the Grand Sultan himself, who, after receiving such authority can doubt that her skin will become as superlatively smooth, soft, white and delicate, as that of the lovely Fatima, whatever may have been its feel or its appearance before. What fair one but must yield implicit faith, when she has the honour of the Countess De —— fairly pledged, that all sepacious [sic] impurities will be at once removed by this wonder-working nostrum. And above all, who but must long for an article, from the seraglio of the Grand Turk, which produces a near resemblance to the Georgian and Circassian beauties?

— "To the Ladies", New-York Herald, 14 July 1802

"Circassian Lotion" was sold in 1806 for the skin, at fifty cents the bottle.

A sovereign remedy for surfeits, scorching from the heat of the sun, freckles, blights from cold and chills of winter, scorbutic, pimples or eruptions of the face and skin, however violent or disfigured, animalcula generated under the cuticle or outer skin, prickley heat, shingles, ring worms, redness of the nose and chin, obstinate cutaneous diseases, and for every impurity or unnatural appearance with which the skin may be affected; to be used as a common wash for clearing and improving the complexion, and in a superior degree to preserve, soften, cleanse and beautify the skin.

— Morning Chronicle (New York City), 20 September 1806

"Circassian Eye-Water" was marketed as "a sovereign remedy for all diseases of the eyes", and in the 1840s "Circassian hair dye" was marketed to create a rich dark lustrous effect.

== Nineteenth-century sideshow attraction ==
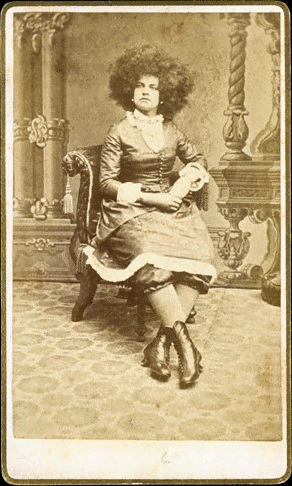
As a sideshow attraction, Circassian beauties were women with big hair, a reference to the teased hair they wore, held in place by beer. Circassian ancestry was not required, as in this example of a Black woman.

The combination of the popular issues of slavery, the Orient, racial ideology, and sexual titillation gave the reports of Circassian women sufficient notoriety at the time that the circus leader P. T. Barnum decided to capitalize on this interest. He displayed a "Circassian Beauty" at his American Museum in 1865. Barnum's Circassian beauties were young women with tall, teased hairstyles, rather like the Afro style of the 1970s. Actual Circassian hairstyles bore no resemblance to Barnum's fantasy. Barnum's first "Circassian" was marketed under the name "Zalumma Agra" and was exhibited at his American Museum in New York from 1864. Barnum had written to John Greenwood, his agent in Europe, asking him to purchase a beautiful Circassian girl to exhibit, or at least to hire a girl who could "pass for" one. However, it seems that "Zalumma Agra" was probably a local girl hired by the show, as were later "Circassians". Barnum also produced a booklet about another of his Circassians, Zoe Meleke, who was portrayed as an ideally beautiful and refined woman who had escaped a life of sexual slavery.

The portrayal of a white woman as a rescued slave at the time of the American Civil War played on the racial connotations of slavery at the time. It has been argued that the distinctive hairstyle affiliates the side-show Circassian with African identity, and thus,

resonates oddly yet resoundingly with the rest of her identifying significations: her racial purity, her sexual enslavement, her position as colonial subject; her beauty. The Circassian blended elements of white Victorian True Womanhood with traits of the enslaved African American woman in one curiosity.

The trend spread, with supposedly Circassian women featured in dime museums and travelling medicine shows, sometimes known as "Moss-haired girls". They were typically identified by the distinctive hairstyle, which was held in place by the use of beer. They also often performed in pseudo-oriental costume. Many postcards of Circassians also circulated. Though Barnum's original women were portrayed as proud and genteel, later images of Circassians often emphasised erotic poses and revealing costumes. As the original fad faded, the "Circassians" started to add to their appeal by performing traditional circus tricks such as sword swallowing.

== In popular culture ==
- The Safety Fire, British progressive metal band, released their song "Circassian Beauties" in 2012.
- The American alternative rock band Monks of Doom released another song with the title "Circassian Beauty" in their 1991 album Meridian.

== See also ==
- White slave trade
- Barbary slave trade
- Ottoman Imperial Harem
- La Circassienne au Bain, 1814 painting by Merry-Joseph Blondel; famously lost with the Titanic
