= List of Ottoman imperial consorts =

This is a list of consorts of the Ottoman sultans, the wives and concubines of the monarchs of the Ottoman Empire who ruled over the transcontinental empire from its inception in 1299 to its dissolution in 1922.

== Honorific and titles ==
=== Hatun ===
Hatun (Ottoman Turkish: خاتون) was used as an honorific for women in the Ottoman period, roughly equivalent to the English term Lady. The term was being used for the Ottoman sultan's consorts. When the son of one of the consorts ascended the throne she became Valide Hatun (Mother of Sultan).

=== Sultan ===
Sultan (سلطان) is a word of Arabic origin, originally meaning "authority" or "dominion". By the beginning of the 16th century, the title of sultan, carried by both men and women of the Ottoman dynasty, was replacing other titles by which prominent members of the imperial family had been known (notably hatun for women and bey for men), with imperial women carrying the title of "Sultan" after their given names. Consequently, the title "Valide Hatun" also turned into "Valide Sultan". In this time, the title "Haseki Sultan" was created and used for the legal wife or Chief Consort of the Ottoman Sultan. For example, Hafsa Sultan, Suleiman's mother and first valide sultan, and Hürrem Sultan, Suleiman's legal wife and first haseki sultan. This usage underlines the Ottoman conception of sovereign power as family prerogative. Towards the end of the seventeenth century the title hatun and sultan for imperial consorts was replaced by Kadın and Ikbal.

=== Kadın ===
Kadın (Ottoman Turkish: قادين) was the title given to the consorts of the Sultan of the Ottoman Empire. The title officially first came in use during the reign of Sultan Suleiman II. The Sultan could have up to four and some times five women with the imperial rank of Kadın and unlimited number of women with the rank of Ikbal.

=== Ikbal ===
Ikbal (Ottoman Turkish: اقبال) was the title given to the official consorts of the Sultan of the Ottoman Empire, who came below the rank of Kadın. Their honorific was "Hanim".

== Consorts of the Ottoman sultans ==
Portrait	Name	Birth name	Origin	Place of Origin	Marriage	Spouse
	Rabia Bala Hatun	Rabia	Turkish	Turkey	Legal wife	Osman I
	Kameriye Malhun Hatun	Mal	Turkish	Turkey	Legal wife	
	Bayalun Hatun			Anatolian beyliks		Orhan I
	Eftendize Hatun	Eftendize	Turkish	Turkey	13th century	Orhan I
	Asporça Hatun		Byzantine Greek	Byzantine Empire		Orhan I
	Valide Nilüfer Hatun		Byzantine Greek	Byzantine Empire		Orhan I
	Theodora Hatun	Theodora Kantakouzene	Byzantine Greek	Byzantine Empire	1347 (legal marriage)	Orhan I
	Theodora Uroš	Theodora Nemanjić	Serbian	Serbian Empire	c. 1351	Orhan I
	Valide Gülçiçek Hatun	unknown	Byzantine Greek	Bithynia	1359 (disputed)	Murad I
	Fülane Hatun	unknown	Turkish		1366	Murad I
	Paşa Melek Hatun		Turkish		(legal marriage)	Murad I
	Fülane Hatun	unknown			after 1372	Murad I
	Kera Thamara Hatun	Kera Tamara	Bulgarian	Bulgarian Empire	1376/1378 (legal marriage)	Murad I
	Fülane Hatun	unknown			c. 1383	Murad I
	Maria Hatun	Maria Paleologa	Byzantine Greek	Byzantine Empire	1389	Murad I
	Fülane Hatun	Olga Dejanovic Dragas	Serbian, daughter of Konstantin of Kostendil'	Serbian Empire	1372 (legal marriage)	Bayezid I
	Devletşah Sultan Hatun		Turkish	Kütahya, Germinayid Principality	1378 (legal marriage)	Bayezid I
	Angelina Hatun	Angelina	Greek	Greece		Bayezid I
	Hafsa Hatun	Hâfize	Turkish	Birgi, Aydinid Principality	1390 (legal marriage)	Bayezid I
	Olivera Despina	Mileva Olivera Lazarević	Serbian	Kruševac, Serbia	1390 (legal marriage)	Bayezid I
	Marija Hatun	Maria	Daughter of the Hungarian count Janos, she was freed by Timur and handed over to Henry III of Castile. She later married Payo Gomez de Soto Mayor.	Hungary		Bayezid I
	Karamanoğlu Hatun		Turkish			Bayezid I
	Valide Devlet Hatun	?	unknown	unknown		Bayezid I
	Valide Emine Hatun	Emine	Turkish	Elbistan, Dulkadirid Principality		Mehmed I
	Şahzade Hatun		Turkish	Amasya, Kutluşah Principality		Mehmed I
	Kumru Hatun		?			Mehmed I
	Halime Hatice Hatun		Turkish			Murad II
	Valide Hüma Hatun		Slavic, Italian, Jewish or Greek			Murad II
	Mara Despina Hatun	Mara Branković	Serb	Serbian Despotate	1435 (legal marriage)	Murad II
	Yeni Hatun		Turkish	Turkey		Murad II
	Valide Gülbahar Hatun		Albanian, Slavic, Pontic Greek or Turkish	Unknown		Mehmed II
	Gülşah Hatun		?	?		Mehmed II
	Sittişah Hatun	Mükrime	Turkish	Elbistan, Dulkadirid Principality	1449 (legal marriage)	Mehmed II
	Çiçek Hatun		Serb , Greek, Hungarian or Turkish			Mehmed II
	Hatice Hatun	Hatice	Greek, Albanian or Turkish			Mehmed II
	Şirin Hatun					Bayezid II
	Hüsnüşah Hatun					Bayezid II
	Bülbül Hatun					Bayezid II
	Nigar Hatun					Bayezid II
	Gülruh Hatun					Bayezid II
	Ayşe Hatun	Ayşe	Turkish	Elbistan, Dulkadirid Principality		Bayezid II
	Muhtereme Ferahşad Hatun					Bayezid II
	Gülbahar Hatun					Bayezid II
	Gülfem Hatun					Bayezid II
	Mühurnaz Hatun					Bayezid II
	Ayşe Hatun	Ayşe	Crimean	Crimean Khanate		Selim I
	Valide Ayşe Hafsa Sultan	unknown	unknown	Europe		Selim I
	Yasemin Hatun	unknown	unknown	unknown		Suleiman I
	Server Hatun	unknown	unknown	unknown		Suleiman I
	Hubeh Hatun	unknown	unknown	unknown		Suleiman I
	Mahidevran Gülbahar Hatun	unknown	Albanian, Circassian, Montenegrin or Crimean	Albania, Circassia, Montenegro or Crimea		Suleiman I
	Haseki Hürrem Sultan		Ruthenian	Kingdom of Poland	early May 1534 (legal marriage)	Suleiman I
Πορτρέτο Νουρμπανου Σουλτάν	Valide Afife Nurbanu Sultan	Cecilia Venier-Baffo or Rachel Marié Nassi or Kalē Karatanou	Venetian or Greek or Jewish	Paros, Republic of Venice or Corfu, Republic of Venice	1571 (legal marriage)	Selim II
	Fülane Hatun	unknown	unknown	unknown		Selim II
	Fülane Hatun	unknown	unknown	unknown		Selim II
	Fülane Hatun	unknown	unknown	unknown		Selim II
	Other four concubines	unknown	unknown	unknown		Selim II
	Valide Safiye Sultan	unknown	Albanian	Albania, Dukagjin Highlands		Murad III
	Şemsiruhsar Hatun	unknown	unknown	unknown		Murad III
	Mihriban Hatun	unknown	unknown	unknown		Murad III
	Şahıhuban Hatun	unknown	unknown	unknown		Murad III
	Nazperver Hatun	unknown	unknown	unknown		Murad III
	Zerefşan Hatun	unknown	unknown	unknown		Murad III
	Fakriye Hatun	unknown	unknown	unknown		Murad III
	Fülane Hatun	unknown	unknown	unknown		Murad III
	Fifteen pregnant concubines	unknown	unknown	unknown		Murad III
	Fülane Hatun	unknown	unknown	unknown		Murad III
	A daughter of Lady Chiajna	unknown	Romanian	Principality of Wallachia		Murad III
	Valide Handan Sultan	unknown	Bosnian or Greek	Ottoman Bosnia or Ottoman Greece		Mehmed III
	Valide Halime Sultan	unknown	Abkhaz	Abkhazia		Mehmed III
	Fülane Hatun	unknown	unknown	unknown		Mehmed III
	Hatice Mahfiruz Hatun	unknown	unknown	unknown		Ahmed I
	Fatma Hatun	unknown	unknown	unknown		Ahmed I
	Valide Mahpeyker Kösem Sultan		Greek. Born on Tinos, Republic of Venice (?)	Greece or Tinos, Republic of Venice (?)		Ahmed I
	Haseki Ayşe Sultan					Osman II
	Meylișah Meleksima Hatun	unknown	Serbian	Serbia		Osman II
	Fülane Hatun	unknown	unknown	unknown	7 February 1622 (legal marriage)	Osman II
	Rukiye Akile Hatun	Akile	Turkish	Istanbul, Ottoman Empire	1622 (legal marriage)	Osman II
	Ayşe Sultan	unknown	unknown	unknown		Murad IV
	Fülane Sultan	unknown	unknown	unknown		Murad IV
	Sanavber Hatun	unknown	unknown	unknown		Murad IV
	Safiye Hatun	unknown	unknown	unknown		Murad IV
	Emirgün's sister (disputed)	unknown				Murad IV
	Zafire Hatun	unknown, possibly Sciabas (Slava) or unlikely Giacoma Beccarini	Georgian, Russian or unlikely Italian	unknown, possibly but unlikely Siena, Grand Duchy of Tuscany		Ibrahim I
	Valide Turhan Hatice Sultan	unknown	Russian, Circassian or Ukrainian	Russia, Circassia or Ukraine		Ibrahim I
	Haseki Hatice Muazzez Sultan	unknown	unknown			Ibrahim I
	Haseki Saliha Dilaşub Sultan	unknown	unknown	unknown		Ibrahim I
	Haseki Ayșe Sultan	unknown	Tatar origins			Ibrahim I
	Haseki Mahienver Sultan	unknown	Circassian	Circassia		Ibrahim I
	Haseki Saçbağlı Sultan	unknown	Circassian	Circassia		Ibrahim I
	Haseki Şivekar Sultan	unknown	Armenian	Armenia		Ibrahim I
	Haseki Hümaşah Sultan	unknown	Georgian or Circassian	Georgia or Circassia	1647 (legal marriage)	Ibrahim I
	Hubyar Hatun					Ibrahim I
	Şekerpare Hatun					Ibrahim I
	Șakizula Hatun					Ibrahim I
	Şekerbanu Hatun					Ibrahim I
	Fülane Hatun					Ibrahim I
	Fülane Hatun					Ibrahim I
	Emetullah Rabia Gülnüş Sultan	Evmania Voria Verzini	From the Greek or Venetian Verzini family from the island of Crete	Rethymno, Crete, Republic of Venice		Mehmed IV
	Afife Kadın	unknown	unknown	unknown		Mehmed IV
	Gülnar Kadın (Her existence is controversial)	unknown	unknown	unknown		Mehmed IV
	Nevruz Hatun	unknown	unknown	unknown		Mehmed IV
	Güneş Hatun (Her existence is controversial)	unknown	unknown	unknown		Mehmed IV
	Gülbeyaz Hatun (Her existence is controversial)	unknown	unknown	unknown		Mehmed IV
	Hatice Hatun (Her existence is controversial)	unknown	unknown	unknown		Mehmed IV
	Cihanșah Hatun	unknown	unknown	unknown		Mehmed IV
	Dürriye Hatun	unknown	unknown	unknown		Mehmed IV
	Kaniye Hatun	unknown	unknown	unknown		Mehmed IV
	Rukiye Hatun	unknown	unknown	unknown		Mehmed IV
	Siyavuș Hatun	unknown	unknown	unknown		Mehmed IV
	Rabia Kadın (Uncertain existence)	unknown	unknown	unknown		
	Hatice Baş Kadın					Suleiman II
	Behzad Kadın					Suleiman II
	Süğlün Kadın					Suleiman II
	Şehsuvar Kadın					Suleiman II
	Zeyneb Kadın					Suleiman II
	İvaz Kadın					Suleiman II
	Haseki Rabia Sultan					Ahmed II
	Şayeste Hatun					Ahmed II
	Alicenab Baş Kadın	unknown	unknown	unknown		Mustafa II
	Afife Baş Kadın	unknown	unknown	unknown		Mustafa II
	Valide Sebkati Saliha Sultan	unknown	unknown, Serbian or Greek	unknown, Serbia or Greece		Mustafa II
	Valide Şehsuvar Sultan	unknown	Ukrainian, Russian or Serbian	Ukraine, Russia or Serbia		Mustafa II
	Bahtiyar Kadın	unknown	unknown	unknown		Mustafa II
	Ivaz Kadın	unknown	unknown	unknown		Mustafa II
	Hatice Kadın	unknown	Bosnian	Bosnia		Mustafa II
	Hüsnuşah Kadın	unknown	unknown	unknown		Mustafa II
	Fatma Şahin Baş Ikbal	unknown	unknown	unknown		
	Hanife Hatun	unknown	unknown	unknown		
	Emetullah Banu Baş Kadın	unknown	unknown	unknown		Ahmed III
	Emine Mihrișah Kadın	unknown	unknown	unknown		Ahmed III
	Rabia Șermi Kadın	unknown	unknown	unknown		Ahmed III
	Ayşe Mihri Behri Kadın	unknown	unknown	unknown		Ahmed III
	Hatem Kadın	unknown	unknown	unknown		Ahmed III
	Emine Muslı Kadın	unknown	Russian	Sochi, Russia		Ahmed III
	Rukiye Kadın	unknown	unknown	unknown		Ahmed III
	Fatma Hümaşah Kadın	unknown	unknown	unknown		Ahmed III
	Gülneş Kadın	unknown	unknown	unknown		Ahmed III
	Hürrem Kadın	unknown	unknown	unknown		Ahmed III
	Meyli Kadın	unknown	unknown	unknown		Ahmed III
	Hatice Kadın	unknown	unknown	unknown		Ahmed III
	Nazife Kadın	unknown	unknown	unknown		Ahmed III
	Nejat Kadın	unknown	unknown	unknown		Ahmed III
	Sadıka Kadın	unknown	unknown	unknown		Ahmed III
	Hüsnüşah Kadın	unknown	unknown	unknown		Ahmed III
	Şahin Kadın	unknown	unknown	unknown		Ahmed III
	Ümmügülsüm Kadın	unknown	unknown	unknown		Ahmed III
	Zeyneb Kadın	unknown	unknown	unknown		Ahmed III
	Hanife Hatun	unknown	unknown	unknown		Ahmed III
	Şayeste Baş Ikbal	unknown	unknown	unknown		
	Hace Ayşe Baş Kadın	unknown	unknown	unknown		Mahmud I
	Hatem Baş Kadın	unknown	unknown	unknown		Mahmud I
	Hace Alicenab Kadın	unknown	unknown	unknown		Mahmud I
	Hace Verdinaz Kadın	unknown	unknown	unknown		Mahmud I
	Hatice Rami Kadın	unknown	unknown	unknown		Mahmud I
	Tiryal Kadın	unknown	unknown	unknown		Mahmud I
	Raziye Kadın	unknown	unknown	unknown		Mahmud I
	Meyyase Hanım	unknown	unknown	unknown		Mahmud I
	Fehmi Hanın	unknown	unknown	unknown		Mahmud I
	Sirri Hanın	unknown	unknown	unknown		Mahmud I
	Habbabe Hanın	unknown	unknown	unknown		Mahmud I
	Leyla Baş Kadın	unknown	unknown	unknown		Osman III
	Fülane Kadın	unknown	unknown	unknown		Osman III
	Zevki Kadın	unknown	unknown	unknown		Osman III
	Emine Ferhunde Kadın	unknown	unknown	unknown		Osman III
	Aynülhayat Baş Kadın	unknown	unknown	unknown	Sometimes considered Mustafa's legal wife.	Mustafa III
	Valide Mihrişah Sultan	unknown	Daughter of Georgian Orthodox priest	Georgia		Mustafa III
	Fehime Kadın	unknown	unknown	unknown		Mustafa III
	Rifat Kadın	unknown	unknown	unknown		Mustafa III
	Ayşe Adilşah Kadın	unknown	Circassian	Circassia		Mustafa III
	Binnaz Kadın	unknown	unknown	unknown		Mustafa III
	Gülman Baş Ikbal	unknown	unknown	unknown		Mustafa III
	Ayşe Baş Kadın	unknown	unknown	unknown		Abdul Hamid I
	Hace Hatice Ruhşah Baş Kadın	unknown	unknown	unknown		Abdul Hamid I
	Binnaz Kadın	unknown	unknown	unknown		Abdul Hamid I
	Nevres Kadın	unknown	unknown	unknown		Abdul Hamid I
	Valide Ayşe Sineperver Sultan	unknown	Bulgarian, Circassian or Georgian	Bulgaria, Circassia or Georgia		Abdul Hamid I
	Mehtabe Kadın	unknown	unknown	unknown		Abdul Hamid I
	Muteber Kadın	unknown	unknown	unknown		Abdul Hamid I
	Fatma Şebsefa Kadın	unknown	unknown	unknown		Abdul Hamid I
	Valide Nakşidil Sultan	unknown	Georgian or Circassian	Georgia or Circassia		Abdul Hamid I
	Hümaşah Kadın	unknown	unknown	unknown		Abdul Hamid I
	Dilpezir Kadın	unknown	unknown	unknown		Abdul Hamid I
	Mislinayab Kadın	unknown	unknown	unknown		Abdul Hamid I
	Mihriban Kadın	unknown	unknown	unknown		Abdul Hamid I
	Nükhetseza Baş Ikbal	unknown	unknown	unknown		Abdul Hamid I
	Nefizar Baş Kadın	unknown	unknown	unknown		Selim III
	Afitab Baş Kadın	unknown	unknown	unknown		Selim III
	Zibifer Kadın	unknown	unknown	unknown		Selim III
	Tabisefa Kadın	unknown	unknown	unknown		Selim III
	Refet Kadın	unknown	unknown	unknown		Selim III
	Nüruşems Kadın	unknown	unknown	unknown		Selim III
	Hüsnümah Kadın	unknown	unknown	unknown		Selim III
	Demhoş Kadın	unknown	unknown	unknown		Selim III
	Goçenigar Kadın	unknown	unknown	unknown		Selim III
	Mahbube Kadın	unknown	unknown	unknown		Selim III
	Aynısefa Kadın	unknown	unknown	unknown		Selim III
	Pakize Baş Ikbal	unknown	unknown	unknown		Selim III
	Meryem Hanım	unknown	unknown	unknown		Selim III
	Şevkinür Baş Kadın	unknown	unknown	unknown		Mustafa IV
	Peykidil Kadın	unknown	unknown	unknown		Mustafa IV
	Dilpezir Kadın	unknown	unknown	unknown		Mustafa IV
	Seyare Kadın	unknown	unknown	unknown		Mustafa IV
	Fatma Baş Kadın	unknown	unknown	unknown		Mahmud II
	Alicenab Baş Kadın	unknown	unknown	unknown		Mahmud II
	Haciye Pertevpiyale Nevfidan Kadın	unknown	unknown	unknown	1823	Mahmud II
	Dilseza Kadın	unknown	unknown	unknown		Mahmud II
	Mislinayab Kadın	unknown	unknown	unknown		Mahmud II
	Kameri Kadın	unknown	unknown	unknown		Mahmud II
	Ebrireftar Kadın	unknown	unknown	unknown		Mahmud II
	Valide Bezmiâlem Sultan	unknown	Georgian or Circassian	Georgia or Circassia	1822	Mahmud II
	Aşubcan Kadın	unknown	Circassian	Circassia	1808	Mahmud II
	Vüslat Kadın	unknown	unknown	unknown		Mahmud II
	Zernigar Kadın	unknown	unknown	unknown	1825	Mahmud II
	Nurtab Kadın	unknown	unknown	unknown		Mahmud II
	Haciye Hoşyar Kadın	unknown	unknown	unknown	1811	Mahmud II
	Pertizfekek Kadın	unknown	unknown	unknown		Mahmud II
	Valide Pertevniyal Sultan	Besime	Kurd, Romanian or Circassian	Romania	1830	Mahmud II
	Hüsnimelek Baş Ikbal	unknown	unknown	unknown		Mahmud II
	Tiryal Hanım	unknown	unknown	unknown	1826	Mahmud II
	Lebrizifelek Hanım	unknown	unknown	unknown		Mahmud II
	Verdicenan Hanım	unknown	unknown	unknown		Mahmud II
	Servetseza Kadın		Circassian	Maykop, Russia	1837	Abdulmejid I
	Tirimüjgan Kadın		Circassian	North Caucasus	1840	Abdulmejid I
	Düzdidil Kadın	Ayşe Dişan	Ubykh	North Caucasus	2 October 1842	Abdulmejid I
	Valide Şevkefza Sultan		Mingrelian and Circassian	Gagra or Circassia	1 August 1839	Abdulmejid I
	Zeynifelek Hanım				1841	Abdulmejid I
	Gülcemal Kadin		Bosnian	Sarajevo, Bosnia and Herzegovina	1840	Abdulmejid I
	Verdicenan Kadın	Saliha Açba		Sukhum, Georgia	17 December 1840	Abdulmejid I
	Nükhetsezâ Hanım	Hatice Baras			21 October 1841	Abdulmejid I
	Mahitab Kadın	Nuriye	Chechen	Makhachkala, Russia	1845	Abdulmejid I
	Nesrin Hanım	Adile Asemiani			1842	Abdulmejid I
	Ceylanyar Hanım	Nafiye Berzeg	Ubykh	Sochi, Russia	1847	Abdulmejid I
	Nergizev Hanım		Natukhai	Anapa, Russia	1847	Abdulmejid I
	Navekmisal Hanım	Biberd			1848	Abdulmejid I
	Bezmiara Kadın		Circassian	Circassia	1849 - 1852 (Legal marriage)	Abdulmejid I
	Nalandil Hanım	Çıpakue	Natukhai	Anapa, Russia	1850	Abdulmejid I
	Şayeste Hanım	İnalipa		Sukhum, Georgia	1851	Abdulmejid I
	Serfiraz Hanım	Ayşe Liah			1852	Abdulmejid I
	Gülüstü Hanım	Fatma Çaçba		Sukhum, Abkhazia	August 1854	Abdulmejid I
	Valide Rahıme Perestu Sultan	Rahime Gogen	Ubykh	Sochi, Russia	20 January 1856 (Legal marriage)	Abdulmejid I
	Dürrünev Kadın	Melek Dziapş-İpa		Batumi, Georgia	20 May 1856	Abdülaziz
	Edadil Kadın	Aredba		Adlersky, Sochi,	1861	Abdülaziz
	Hayranidil Kadın			Kars, Ottoman Empire	21 September 1865	Abdülaziz
	Nesrin Kadın	Nesrin Zevş-Barakay	Ubykh	North Caucasus	1868	Abdülaziz
	Gevheri Kadın	Emine Svatnba		Gudauta, Georgia	1872	Abdülaziz
	Mevhibe Kadın	Mevhibe Tarkanişvili		Tbilisi, Georgia	21 January 1857	Murad V
	Reftarıdil Kadın	Hatko			4 February 1859	Murad V
	Şayan Kadın	Safiye Zan	Natukhai	Anapa, Russia	5 February 1869	Murad V
	Meyliservet Kadın		Circassian	Batumi, Georgia	8 June 1874	Murad V
	Resan Hanım	Ayşe		Artvin, Ottoman Empire	2 November 1877	Murad V
	Nazikeda Kadın	Tsanba			1863	Abdul Hamid II
	Nurefsun Kadın		Circassian	North Caucasus	October 1868 - 26 June 1879	Abdul Hamid II
	Bedrifelek Kadın	Karzeg	Natukhai	Anapa, Russia	15 November 1868	Abdul Hamid II
	Bidar Kadın	Talustan	Circassian	Kobuleti, Adjara, Georgia	2 September 1875	Abdul Hamid II
	Dilpesend Kadın	Azize	Abkhazia	Tbilisi, Georgia	10 April 1884	Abdul Hamid II
	Mezidimestan Kadın	Kadriye Mikanba		Gagra, Georgia	2 February 1885	Abdul Hamid II
	Emsalinur Kadın	Kaya			20 November 1885	Abdul Hamid II
	Müşfika Kadın	Ayşe Ağırba		Hopa, Caucasus	12 February 1886	Abdul Hamid II
	Sazkar Hanım	Atiye Maan		Ayvacık, Çanakkale, Ottoman Empire	31 August 1890	Abdul Hamid II
	Peyveste Hanım	Rabia Emuhvari		Pitsunda,	24 January 1893	Abdul Hamid II
	Fatma Pesend Hanım	Fatma Kadriye Açba		Istanbul, Ottoman Empire	20 July 1896	Abdul Hamid II
	Behice Hanım	Behiye Maan		Beynevi, Adapazarı, Ottoman Empire	10 May 1900	Abdul Hamid II
	Saliha Naciye Hanım	Zeliha Ankuap	Georgian	Yukarı Ihsaniye, Bartın, Ottoman Empire	4 November 1904	Abdul Hamid II
	Kamures Kadın		Ubykh		30 September 1872	Mehmed V
	Dürrüaden Kadın	Hatice Voçibe	Circassian	Caucasus	10 October 1876	Mehmed V
	Mihrengiz Kadın	Fatma	Ubykh	Sochi, Russia	4 April 1887	Mehmed V
	Nazperver Kadın	Rukiye Hanım Çikotua	Ottoman Turk	Istanbul, Ottoman Empire	1888	Mehmed V
	Dilfirib Kadın		Circassian	Istanbul, Ottoman Empire	1907	Mehmed V
	Nazikeda Kadın	Emine Marşan	Abkhazians		8 June 1885	Mehmed VI
	Inşirah Hanım	Seniye Voçibe	Ubykh	Maşukiye, Ottoman Empire	8 July 1905	Mehmed VI
	Müveddet Kadın	Şadiye Çıhcı	Abkhazians	Derbent, Russia	24 April 1911	Mehmed VI
	Nevvare Hanım	Ayşe Çıhcı	Abkhazians	Derbent, Russia	20 June 1918 - 20 May 1924	Mehmed VI
	Nevzad Hanım	Nimet Bargu	Albanian or Turkish	Istanbul, Ottoman Empire	1 September 1921	Mehmed VI

== See also ==
- Ottoman dynasty
- Ottoman Empire
- List of mothers of the Ottoman sultans
- List of Valide Sultans
- List of Ottoman Sultans

== Sources ==
- Akyıldız, Ali (2009). "Saliha Sultan" (PDF). Islam Ansiklopedisi. Vol. 36. Istanbul: İslâm Araştırmaları Merkezi. p. 45.
- Alderson, Anthony Dolphin (1956). The Structure of the Ottoman Dynasty. Clarendon Press.
- Avtorkhanov, Abdurahman (1996). Marie Bennigsen Broxup (ed.). The North Caucasus Barrier: The Russian Advance Towards the Muslim World. Hurst. ISBN 9781850653059.
- Babinger, Franz (1992) [1978]. Mehmed the Conqueror and His Time. Bollingen Series 96. Translated from the German by Ralph Manheim. Edited, with a preface, by William C. Hickman (1992 ed.). Princeton, New Jersey: Princeton University Press. ISBN 0-691-09900-6.
- Baer, Marc David (2011). Honored by the Glory of Islam: Conversion and Conquest in Ottoman Europe. Oxford University Press. ISBN 9780199797837.
- Barzilai-Lumbroso, Ruth (2008). Turkish Men, Ottoman Women: Popular Turkish Historians and the Writing of Ottoman Women's History. University of California. ISBN 978-0-549-48355-7.
- Carsten, F. L. (1961). The New Cambridge Modern History. Vol. V. The Ascendancy of France, 1648–88. Cambridge University Press. pp. 505–506.
- Cooke, Miriam; Göknar, Erdağ M.; Parker, Grant Richard (2008). Mediterranean passages: readings from Dido to Derrida. University of North Carolina Press. ISBN 9780807831830.
- Davis, Fanny (1970). The Palace of Topkapi in Istanbul. Scribner. OCLC 636864790.
- Emecen, Feridun (1996). "Gülbahar Hatun". TDV İslâm Ansiklopedisi.
- Freely, John (1999). Inside the Seraglio: Private Lives of the Sultans in Istanbul. Viking. ISBN 978-0-670-87839-0.
- İlgürel, M. (2002). "Kösem Sultan" ( (PDF)). Islamansiklopedisi. Vol. 26. pp. 273–275. Archived from the original on 2015-06-24.
- Iorga, Nicolae (1909). Geschichte des Osmanischen Reiches. Vol. 2. Gotha F.A. Perthes.
- İpşirli, Mehmet (1996). Gülnûş Emetullah Sultan (PDF). Vol. 14. İstanbul: İslâm Araştırmaları Merkezi. pp. 248–249.
- Karaca, Filiz (2012). "Turhan Sultan". Islam Ansiklopedisi (in Turkish). Vol. 41. İslâm Araştırmaları Merkezi. pp. 423–425.
- Kemal, Meram, Ali (1977). Padişah anaları : resimli, belgesel tarih romanı. Öz Yayınları. OCLC 23697956.
- Lowry, Heath W. (2012). The Nature of the Early Ottoman State. SUNY Press. ISBN 978-0-7914-8726-6.
- Peirce, Leslie (2017). Empress of the East: How a European Slave Girl Became Queen of the Ottoman Empire. New York Basic Books. ISBN 978-0-4650-3251-8.
- Sakaoğlu, Necdet (2015). Bu mülkün kadın sultanları (in Turkish). İstanbul: ALFA Basım Yayım Dağıtım San. ve T ic. Ltd. Şti. pp. 279–291. ISBN 978-605-171-079-2.
- Sakaoğlu, Necdet (2008). Bu mülkün kadın sultanları: Vâlide sultanlar, hâtunlar, hasekiler, kadınefendiler, sultanefendiler. Oğlak Yayıncılık. ISBN 9789753296236.
- Somel, Selcuk Aksin (2003). Historical Dictionary of the Ottoman Empire (2nd ed.). Scarecrow Press. ISBN 978-0810866065.
- Süreyya Mehmed Bey (1996). Nuri Akbayar (ed.). Sicill-i Osmani. Vol. 1. Istanbul: Tarih Vakfi Yurt Yayınlar. ISBN 975-333-039-1.
- Tezcan, Baki (2008). "The Debut of Kösem Sultan's Political Career". Turcica. 40 (40): 347–359. doi:10.2143/TURC.40.0.2037143.
- Uluçay, M. Çağatay (2011). Padişahların Kadınları ve Kızları (in Turkish). Is.: Ötüken. pp. 105–107. ISBN 978-9754378405.
- Yermolenko, Galina I (2013). Roxolana in European Literature, History and Culturea. Ashgate. ISBN 978-1-409-47611-5. Archived from the original on 14 January 2017.
