= Zeynifelek Hanım =

Consort of Ottoman Sultan Abdulmejid I

- Born: 1824; Abkhazia
- Died: 20 December 1842 (aged 17–18); Constantinople, Ottoman Empire (modern-day Istanbul, Turkey)
- Burial: Nakşidil Sultan Mausoleum, Fatih Mosque, Istanbul
- Spouse: Abdulmejid I (m. 1839)
- Issue: Behiye Sultan
Names
- Turkish: Zeynifelek Hanım; Ottoman Turkish: زین فلک خانم
- House: Ottoman (by marriage)
- Religion: Sunni Islam

Zeynifelek Hanım (Ottoman Turkish: زین فلك خانم; 1824 - 20 December 1842; meaning "Ornament from heaven") was a consort of Sultan Abdulmejid I of the Ottoman Empire.

Zeynifelek was Abkhaz, and hailed from the Klıç princely family. She was educated at court with her sister and cousins and Bezmiâlem Sultan, Abdülmejid's mother, introduced her to the sultan. Known for her beauty and skill as a painter, Abdülmejid asked her for a portrait of himself and then fell in love with her.

Zeynifelek married Abdulmejid in 1840. She was given the title of "Second Ikbal". On 22 February 1841, she gave birth to her only child, a daughter, Behiye Sultan (called also Behi Sultan) in the Old Beşiktaş Palace. The princess died at the age of six in 1847.

Zeynifelek Hanım died of tuberculosis on 20 December 1842, and was buried in the mausoleum of Nakşidil Sultan, in Fatih Mosque, Istanbul. Charles White, who visited Istanbul in 1843, said the following about her:

...Zinet or Zihem Felik [Zeynifelek]...died in 1842....The deceased...is said to have been of most intractable temper, and most jealous and fretful disposition. This eventually lead to the pulmonary complaint of which she died.

== Issue ==
Name	Birth	Death	Notes
Behiye Sultan	22 February 1841	3 June 1847	Called also Behi Sultan, born in Beşiktaş Palace; buried in New Mosque

== In literature ==
- Zeynifelek is a character in Hıfzı Topuz's historical novel Abdülmecit: İmparatorluk Çökerken Sarayda 22 Yıl: Roman (2009).

== See also ==
- Ikbal (title)
- Ottoman Imperial Harem
- List of consorts of the Ottoman sultans

== Annotations ==
1. She is also called Zeynimelek (ornated angel), and Zerrinmelek (golden angel).

== Sources ==
- Paşa, Ahmed Cevdet (1960). Tezâkir. [2]. 13 - 20, Volume 2. Türk Tarih Kurumu Basımevi.
- Sakaoğlu, Necdet (2008). Bu Mülkün Kadın Sultanları: Vâlide Sultanlar, Hâtunlar, Hasekiler, Kadınefendiler, Sultanefendiler. Oğlak Yayıncılık. ISBN 978-6-051-71079-2.
- Uluçay, M. Çağatay (2011). Padişahların kadınları ve kızları. Ötüken. ISBN 978-9-754-37840-5.
- White, Charles (1846). Three years in Constantinople; or, Domestic manners of the Turks in 1844. London, H. Colburn.
