= Nergizev Hanım =

Consort of Ottoman Sultan Abdulmejid I

- Born: 1830; Anapa, Circassia
- Died: 26 October 1848 (aged 17–18) or 26 October 1858 (aged 27–28); Constantinople, Ottoman Empire (present day Istanbul, Turkey)
- Burial: Refia Sultan Mausoleum, New Mosque, Istanbul
- Spouse: Abdulmejid I (m. 1847)
- Issue: Şehzade Mehmed Fuad
Names
- Turkish: Nergizev Hanım; Ottoman Turkish: نرکزو خانم
- House: Ottoman (by marriage)
- Father: Albor Bey
- Mother: Daduse Hanım
- Religion: Sunni Islam

Nergizev Hanım (Ottoman Turkish: نرکزو خانم; "daffodil"; 1830 – 26 October 1848 or 1858), called also Nergizu Hanim or Nergis Hanim, was a consort of Sultan Abdulmejid I of the Ottoman Empire.

She was Circassian, by the Natuhay tribe. She had two brothers, Ibrahim Bey and Hüseyn Bey, and two sisters, Mihrinur Hanım and Münevver Hanım, who lived with her in Istanbul. Her brothers became Kaymakam.

Nergizev married Abdulmejid in 1847, and was given the title of "Fourth Ikbal". On 7 July 1848, a year after the marriage, she gave birth to her only child, a son, Şehzade Mehmed Fuad in the Old Çırağan Palace. The prince died at the age of two months on 28 September 1848.

She died of tuberculosis a month after the death of her son, on 26 October 1848, but other source says that she died on 26 October 1858. She was buried in the mausoleum of Refia Sultan in New Mosque, Istanbul.

== Issue ==
Name	Birth	Death	Notes
Şehzade Mehmed Fuad	7 July 1848	28 September 1848	born in Çırağan Palace; buried in New Mosque

== In literature ==
- Nergizev is a character in Hıfzı Topuz's historical novel Abdülmecit: İmparatorluk Çökerken Sarayda 22 Yıl: Roman (2009).

== See also ==
- Ikbal (title)
- Ottoman Imperial Harem
- List of consorts of the Ottoman sultans

== Sources ==
- Paşa, Ahmed Cevdet (1960). Tezâkir. [2]. 13 - 20, Volume 2. Türk Tarih Kurumu Basımevi.
- Sakaoğlu, Necdet (2008). Bu Mülkün Kadın Sultanları: Vâlide Sultanlar, Hâtunlar, Hasekiler, Kandınefendiler, Sultanefendiler. Oğlak Yayıncılık. ISBN 978-6-051-71079-2.
- Uluçay, Mustafa Çağatay (2011). Padişahların kadınları ve kızları. Ankara: Ötüken. ISBN 978-9-754-37840-5.
- Bey, Mehmet Süreyya; Akbayar, Nuri (1996). Sicill-i Osmanî (in Turkish). ISBN 978-975-333-038-1.
- Alderson, Anthony Dolphin (1956). The Structure of the Ottoman Dynasty. Greenwood Publishing Group. ISBN 978-0-313-22522-2.
- Açba, Harun (2007). Kadın efendiler (in Turkish). ISBN 978-975-996-109-1.
