= Navekmisal Hanım =

Consort of Ottoman Sultan Abdulmejid I

- Born: c. 1827
- Died: 5 August 1854 (aged 26–27); Şemsipaşa Palace, Üsküdar, Constantinople, Ottoman Empire (present day Istanbul, Turkey)
- Burial: Imperial ladies Mausoleum, New Mosque, Istanbul
- Spouse: Abdulmejid I (m. 1853)
Names
- Turkish: Navekmisal Hanım; Ottoman Turkish: ناوك مثال خانم
- House: Ottoman (by marriage)
- Religion: Sunni Islam

Navekmisal Hanım (Ottoman Turkish: ناوك مثال خانم; 1827 – 5 August 1854; meaning "Coquettish"), called also Navekvisal Hanim, was a consort of Sultan Abdulmejid I of the Ottoman Empire.

She was born in about 1827 as a princess of the Caucasian Biberd family. His father was Prince Rustem Bey Biberd and Princess Fatma Kızılbek. She was raised in Istanbul under the tutelage of her aunt, Princess Keşfiraz Hanım, together with her sister Suzidilara Hanım, who entered the service of Abdülhamid II and died in 1919. She was introduced to Abdülmecid I by his mother Bezmiâlem Sultan.

Navekmisal married Abdulmejid in 1853. She was given the title of "Fourth Ikbal". She remained childless. In early 1854, she probably had fallen victim to the epidemic of tuberculosis then raging in Istanbul in the nineteenth century. On 24 February, she left the Dolmabahçe Palace because she was ill with tuberculosis. She died on 5 August 1854, at Şemsipaşa Palace located at Üsküdar. She is buried in the mausoleum of the imperial ladies at the New Mosque, Istanbul.

== In literature ==
- Navekmisal is a character in Hıfzı Topuz's historical novel Abdülmecit: İmparatorluk Çökerken Sarayda 22 Yıl: Roman (2009).

== See also ==
- Ikbal (title)
- Ottoman Imperial Harem
- List of consorts of the Ottoman sultans

== Sources ==
- Sakaoğlu, Necdet (2007). Bu Mülkün Kadın Sultanları. Beyoğlu, İstanbul : Oğlak Yayıncılık ve Reklamcılık. ISBN 978-9-753-29299-3.
- Uluçay, Mustafa Çağatay (2011). Padişahların kadınları ve kızları. Ankara: Ötüken. ISBN 978-9-754-37840-5.
