= Ceylanyar Hanım =

Consort of Ottoman Sultan Abdulmejid I

- Born: Nafiye Hanim c. 1830; Sochi, Circassia, North Caucasus, Russian Empire
- Died: 27 December 1855 (aged 24–25); Feriye Palace, Constantinople, Ottoman Empire (present day Istanbul, Turkey)
- Burial: Gülüstü Hanım Mausoleum, Fatih Mosque, Istanbul, Turkey
- Consort of: Abdulmecid I (m. 1851)
- Issue: Şehzade Mehmed Rüşdi
Names
- Turkish: Ceylanyar Hanım; Ottoman Turkish: جیلان یار خانم
- House: Ottoman (by marriage)
- Religion: Sunni Islam

Nafiye Ceylanyar Hanım (Ottoman Turkish: جیلان یار خانم; "precious" and "gazelle"; c. 1830 - 27 December 1855) was a consort of Sultan Abdulmecid I of the Ottoman Empire.

== Life ==
She was of Circassian origins and was born in Sochi. Her real name was Nafiye Hanım. She was tall, with long golden hair. Having been presented in the Ottoman Imperial Harem by Adile Sultan, Ceylanyar married Abdülmecid in 1851, who had fallen in love with her after seeing her dance. Her family received land and income. She was given the title of "Fifth Ikbal". On 31 March 1852, she gave birth to her only child, a son, Şehzade Mehmed Rüşdi in the Old Çırağan Palace. The baby died at the age of nine months. The same year, she was elevated to the title of "Fourth Ikbal".

In early 1853, she was elevated to the title of "Third Ikbal", and in 1854 to the title of "Second Ikbal". She died of tuberculosis in the Feriye Palace, on 27 December 1855, and was buried in the mausoleum of Gülistü Kadin, Fatih Mosque, Istanbul.

== Issue ==
Name	Birth	Death	Notes
Şehzade Mehmed Rüşdi	31 March 1852	5 December 1852	born in Çırağan Palace; buried in Tomb of Abdul Hamid I

== In literature ==
- Ceylanyar is a character in Hıfzı Topuz's historical novel Abdülmecit: İmparatorluk Çökerken Sarayda 22 Yıl: Roman (2009).

== See also ==
- Ikbal (title)
- Ottoman Imperial Harem
- List of consorts of the Ottoman sultans

== Sources ==
- Uluçay, M. Çağatay (2011). Padişahların kadınları ve kızları. Ötüken. ISBN 978-9-754-37840-5.
- Sakaoğlu, Necdet (2008). Bu Mülkün Kadın Sultanları: Vâlide Sultanlar, Hâtunlar, Hasekiler, Kandınefendiler, Sultanefendiler. Oğlak Yayıncılık. ISBN 978-6-051-71079-2.
- Paşa, Ahmed Cevdet (1960). Tezâkir. [2]. 13 - 20, Volume 2. Türk Tarih Kurumu Basımevi.
