= Bezmiara Kadın =

Wife of Ottoman Sultan Abdulmejid I

- Born: Circassia
- Died: 1909; Istanbul
- Spouse: Abdulmejid I (m. 1847; div. 1859) Tevfik Pasha (m. 1859, divorced) Ahmed Bey (divorced)
- Issue: First marriage; Mukbile Sultan; Second marriage; Emine Cavidan Hanım
Names
- Turkish: Bezmiara Kadın; Ottoman Turkish: بزم آرا قادین
- House: Ottoman (by marriage)
- Father: Ismail Kamil Paşah (adoptive)
- Mother: Fatma Zehra Hanım (adoptive)
- Religion: Sunni Islam

Bezmiara Kadın (Ottoman Turkish: بزم آرا قادین; "adorned banquet"; died 1909) was the second legal wife of Sultan Abdulmejid I of the Ottoman Empire.

== Early life ==
Of Circassian origin, Bezmiara Kadın was the adoptive daughter of Fatma Zehra Hanım known as "Mısırlı Hanım," the daughter of Mehmed Arif Pasha, and granddaughter of grand vizier Halil Hamid Pasha. She was the wife of Ismail Kamil Pasha, the son of Muhammad Ali of Egypt, After Ismail Pasha's death she moved to Istanbul, and settled in Halil Hamid Pasha's palace located in Akıntıburnu.

== First marriage ==
One day, when Abdulmejid was in his twenties, he visited Mısırlı Hanım. Here he saw Bezmiara, who played the piano, and fell in love with her. He asked her hand in marriage, but Bezmiara flatly refused. However, she soon consented to his proposal. The marriage took place in 1847, and she was given the title of "Fifth Ikbal".

In 1848, she was elevated to the title of "Fourth Ikbal". On 22 February 1850, she gave birth to her only child, a daughter, Mükbile Sultan in the Çırağan Palace, who died at the age of two months. In the same year she was elevated to the title of "Third Ikbal". In 1853, she was elevated to the title of "Senior Ikbal", and in 1854 to the title of "Fifth Kadın".

Abdulmejid not only loved Bezmiara but esteemed her. He had her moved to a pleasant galley which he had presented to her. Here she formed an intimate relationship with a certain Tevfik Pasha.

== Second marriage ==
Bezmiara divorced Abdulmejid and married Tevfik Pasha on 2 June 1859. Although the sultan's ministers had required her, in the divorce agreement, to never remarry, as it would have been an insult to the sultan, she ignored them. Abdülmejid did not punish her, despite the invitation to do so, but gave the couple a palace owned by the Crown. When Sultan Abdulaziz ascended the throne after the death of his brother in 1861, he relocated Tevfik and Bezmiara to Bursa. The two divorced soon after, and Tevfik was put to death in 1865. The couple had a daughter named Emine Cavidan Hanım born on 28 October 1862 in Istanbul. After her birth her parents divorced.

Cavidan married Abdulmejid and Serfiraz Hanım's son, Şehzade Selim Süleyman in 1886. After the two divorced, she married Prince Hüseyin Bey of Egypt on 2 February 1891, and after his death in 1898, she married Osman Pasha.

== Third marriage ==
After her divorce from Tevfik Pasha, Bezmiara married the director of Bursa Awqaf, Uzun Ahmed Bey. The couple divorced after some years. She returned to Istanbul, where she had a troubled life.

== Issue ==
Name	Birth	Death	Notes
By Abdulmejid I
Mükbile Sultan	9 February 1850	25 February 1850	born in Çırağan Palace, died in infancy, and buried in New Mosque
By Tevfik Pasha
Emine Cavidan Hanım	28 October 1862	—N/a	married thrice, and had issue
By Uzun Ahmed Bey
no issue

== In literature ==
- Bezmiara is a character in Hıfzı Topuz's historical novel Abdülmecit: İmparatorluk Çökerken Sarayda 22 Yıl: Roman (2009).

== See also ==
- Kadın (title)
- Ottoman Imperial Harem
- List of consorts of the Ottoman sultans

== Annotations ==
1. She is also called Bezmican, and Bezmi.

== Sources ==
- Hanim, Melek (1872). Thirty years in the harem: or, The autobiography of Melek-Hanum, wife of H.H. Kibrizli-Mehemet-Pasha.
- Uluçay, M. Çağatay (2011). Padişahların kadınları ve kızları. Ötüken. ISBN 978-9-754-37840-5.
- Sakaoğlu, Necdet (2008). Bu Mülkün Kadın Sultanları: Vâlide Sultanlar, Hâtunlar, Hasekiler, Kandınefendiler, Sultanefendiler. Oğlak Yayıncılık. ISBN 978-6-051-71079-2.
- Paşa, Ahmed Cevdet (1960). Tezâkir. [2]. 13 - 20, Volume 2. Türk Tarih Kurumu Basımevi.
