= Abdülmecid I =

Sultan of the Ottoman Empire from 1839 to 1861

- Custodian of the Two Holy Mosques; Khan
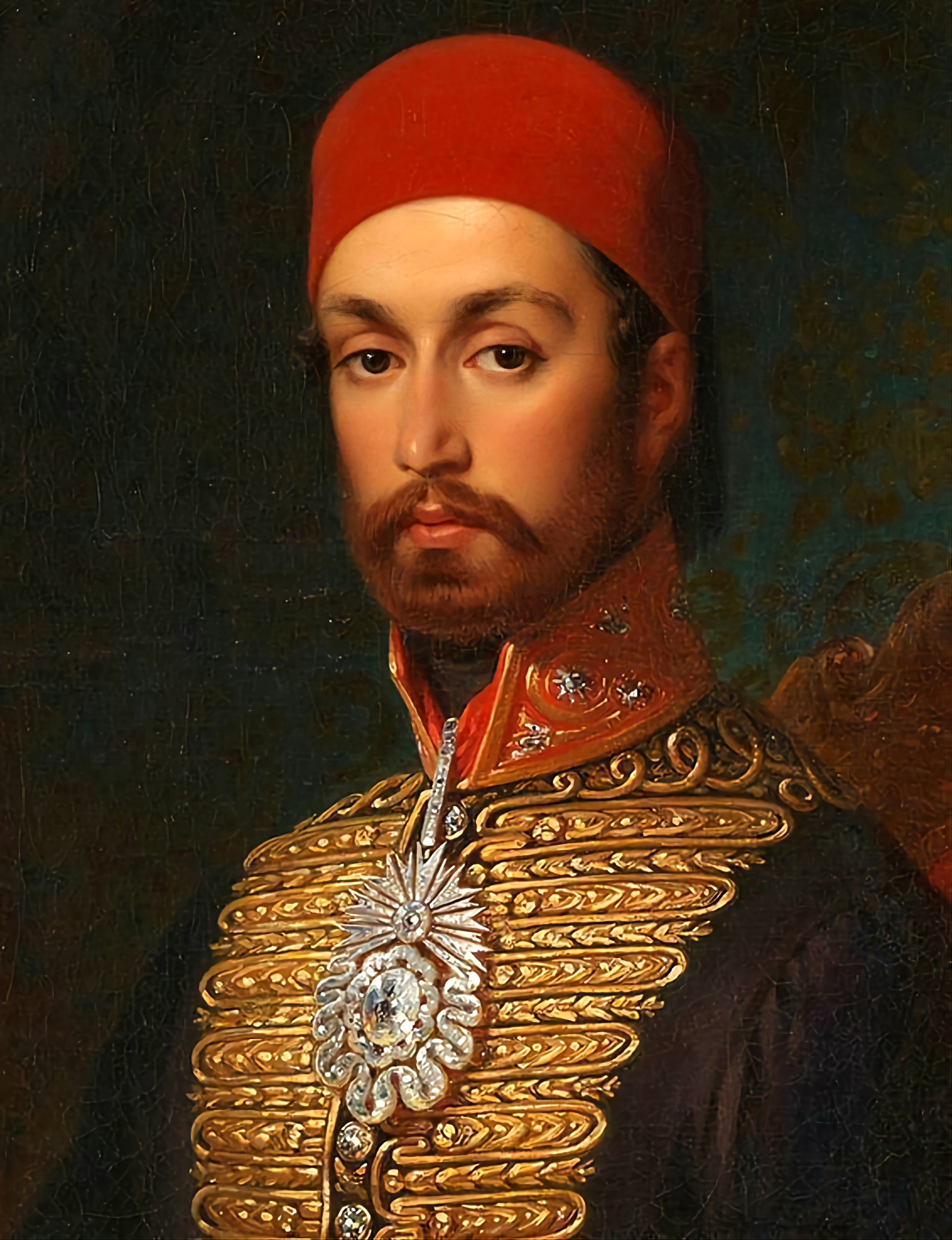
- Portrait by Konstantin Cretius

Sultan of the Ottoman Empire (Padishah)
- Reign: 2 July 1839 – 25 June 1861
- Predecessor: Mahmud II
- Successor: Abdulaziz
- Grand Viziers: See list: Husrev Pasha Sadık Rıfat Pasha Mehmed Emin Rauf Pasha Ibrahim Sarim Pasha Topal Izzet Mehmed Pasha Mustafa Reşid Pasha Mehmed Emin Âli Pasha Damat Mehmed Ali Pasha Mustafa Naili Pasha Kıbrıslı Mehmed Emin Pasha Mehmed Rushdi Pasha

Ottoman Caliph (Amir al-Mu'minin)
- Predecessor: Mahmud II
- Successor: Abdulaziz
- Born: 25 April 1823; Constantinople, Ottoman Empire
- Died: 25 June 1861 (aged 38); Constantinople, Ottoman Empire
- Burial: Yavuz Selim Mosque, Fatih, Istanbul
- Consorts: Servetseza Kadın; Şevkefza Kadın; Tirimüjgan Kadın; Verdicenan Kadın; Gülcemal Kadın; Gülistu Kadın; Rahime Perestu Kadın; Bezmiara Kadın; Mahitab Kadın; Düzdidil Hanım; Nükhetseza Hanım; Zeynifelek Hanım; Nesrin Hanım; Ceylanyar Hanım; Serfiraz Hanım; Nalandil Hanım; Navekimisal Hanım; Nergizev Hanım; Şayeste Hanım; Others
- Issue Among others: See: Murad V; Abdul Hamid II; Fatma Sultan; Refia Sultan; Cemile Sultan; Mehmed V; Münire Sultan; Şehzade Ahmed Kemaleddin; Behice Sultan; Şehzade Mehmed Burhaneddin; Seniha Sultan; Şehzade Ahmed Nureddin; Mediha Sultan; Naile Sultan; Şehzade Selim Süleyman; Mehmed VI
Names
- Abdülmecid Han bin Mahmud
- Dynasty: Ottoman
- Father: Mahmud II
- Mother: Bezmiâlem Sultan
- Religion: Sunni Islam
- Tughra

Abdülmecid I (Ottoman Turkish: عبد المجید اول, romanized: ʿAbdü'l-Mecîd, Turkish: I. Abdülmecid; 25 April 1823 – 25 June 1861) was the 31st sultan of the Ottoman Empire. He succeeded his father Mahmud II on 2 July 1839.

Abdulmejid's greatest achievement was the announcement of the Tanzimat Edict upon his accession, prepared by his then Foreign Minister Mustafa Reshid Pasha, which effectively began the Tanzimat era, or era of reorganization, in the Ottoman Empire. He was a mild-mannered monarch, giving the Sublime Porte the autonomy needed for its reform projects. One of the main goals of the Tanzimat was to encourage Ottomanism among the millets to stop rising nationalist movements within the empire, but despite new laws and reforms to integrate non-Muslims and non-Turks more thoroughly into Ottoman society, in the long term, the movement failed.

Abdulmejid forged alliances with the major powers of Western Europe, namely the United Kingdom and France, which fought alongside the Ottoman Empire in the Crimean War against Russia. During the Congress of Paris on 30 March 1856, the Ottoman Empire was officially included among the Concert of Europe. Abdulmejid suddenly died of tuberculosis and he was succeeded by his half-brother, Abdul Aziz.

== Early life ==
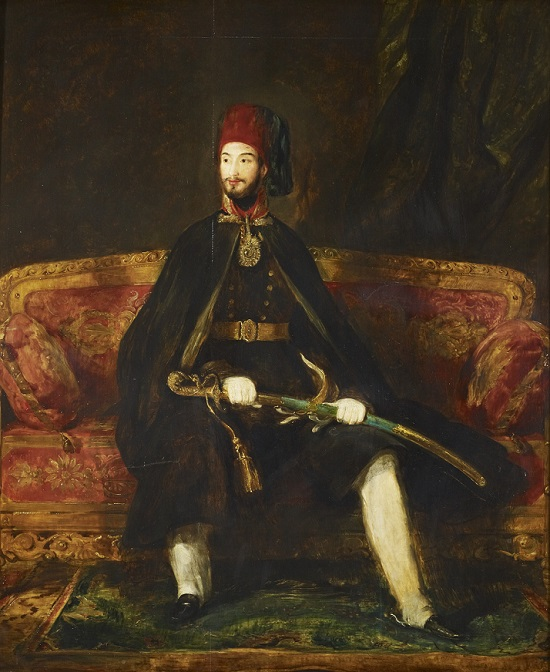
Portrait of Abdülmecid I by David Wilkie, 1840.

Abdülmecid was born on 25 April 1823 at Beşiktaş Palace or at Topkapı Palace, in Istanbul. His mother was the Georgian consort Bezmiâlem Kadın.

Abdülmecid received a European education and was the first sultan to speak fluent French. Like Abdülaziz who succeeded him, he was interested in literature and classical music.

== Reign ==
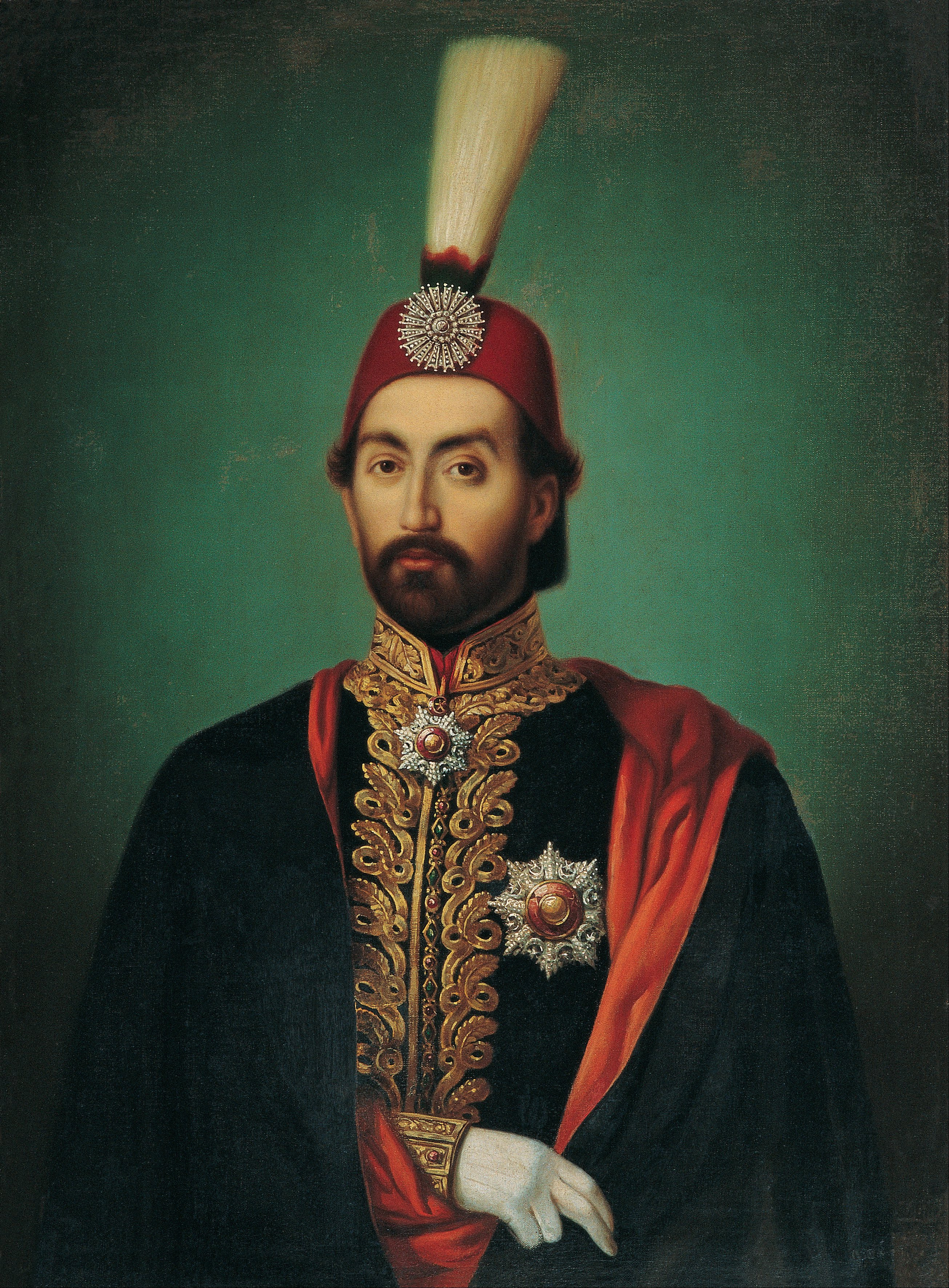
A painting of Abdulmejid at the Pera Museum in Istanbul (oil on canvas, 1850s).

=== Oriental Crisis ===
When Abdülmecid acceded to the throne on 2 July 1839, he was only sixteen and inexperienced, and the affairs of the Ottoman Empire were in a critical state. His father Mahmud II died at the start of the Second Egyptian–Ottoman War, the news reached Istanbul that the empire's army had just been defeated at Nizip by the Egyptian Army led by Ibrahim Pasha. At the same time, the empire's fleet was on its way to Alexandria, where it was handed over to Muhammad Ali by its commander Ahmed Fevzi Pasha on the pretext that the young sultan's advisers had sided with Russia. However, through the intervention of the European powers during the Oriental Crisis of 1840, Muhammad Ali was obliged to come to terms, and the Ottoman Empire was saved from further attacks while its territories in Syria, Lebanon and Palestine were restored. The terms were finalised at the Convention of London (1840) which saved the empire from greater embarrassment.

=== Tanzimat reforms ===
Like his father, Abdülmecid was an advocate of reforms and was lucky enough to have the support of progressive viziers such as Mustafa Reşit Pasha, Mehmet Emin Âli Pasha and Fuad Pasha. Abdülmecid was also the first sultan to listen directly to the public's complaints on special reception days, which were usually held every Friday. Abdülmecid toured the empire's territories to see in person how the Tanzimat reforms were being applied. He travelled to İzmit, Mudanya, Bursa, Gallipoli, Çanakkale, Lemnos, Lesbos and Chios in 1844 and toured the Balkan provinces in 1846. In compliance with his father's express instructions, Abdülmecid immediately carried out the reforms to which Mahmud II had devoted himself. On 3 November 1839, the Edict of Gülhane, also known as Tanzimat Fermanı, was proclaimed, consolidating and enforcing these reforms.

By these enactments it was provided that the sultan's subjects of all classes should have their lives and property protected; that taxes should be fairly imposed and justice impartially administered; and that all should have full religious liberty and equal civil rights. The scheme met with strong opposition from the Muslim governing classes and the ulema, or religious authorities, and was only partially implemented, especially in the more remote parts of the empire. More than one conspiracy was formed against the sultan's life on account of it.

The 1840s saw the creation of the first banknotes and the establishment of the Ottoman lira. The financial system was reorganised after the French model. Tax farming was abolished and aşar was to be equally levied everywhere. Plans were also set to abolish slave markets. After the Imperial Reform Edict, further reforms towards equality between millets were implemented, including the abolition of a capitation tax which imposed higher tariffs on non-Muslims and the right to serve as soldiers in the Ottoman army.

Other French-inspired reforms included the reorganization of the Civil and Criminal Code and the reorganization of education. The General Council of Education (Meclis-i Maarif-i Umumiye) was created in 1841, followed by the Ministry of Education. A new system of civil and criminal courts was established with both European and Ottoman judges. The first modern universities and academies in the European tradition were established in 1848, coinciding with the founding of an Ottoman school in Paris.

Many army reforms were also implemented in the early 1840s, including the introduction of conscription. In 1844, an Ottoman national flag was adopted and Abdul Mecid's anthem was adopted as the Ottoman imperial anthem.

In 1853 the General Council of Reorganization (Meclis-i Âli-i Tanzimat) was established. Two representatives from each eyalet were summoned to a council to report the needs of their region. This was the prototype of the First Ottoman Parliament (1876).

Another notable reform was that the turban was officially outlawed for the first time during Abdülmecid's reign, in favour of the fez. European fashions were also adopted by the Court. (The fez would be banned in 1925 by the same Republican National Assembly that abolished the sultanate and proclaimed the Turkish Republic in 1923).

=== Foreign politics ===
When Lajos Kossuth and his comrades sought refuge in Turkey after the failure of the Hungarian Revolution of 1848, the sultan was called on by Austria and Russia to surrender them, but he refused.

According to traditional stories, plans were made to send humanitarian aid of £10,000 (£1,225,053.76 in 2019) to Ireland during its Great Famine, but later it was agreed to reduce it to £1,000 (£122,505.38 in 2019) at the insistence of either his own ministers or British diplomats to avoid violating protocol by giving more than Queen Victoria, who had made a donation of £2,000. Food and grain were also sent.

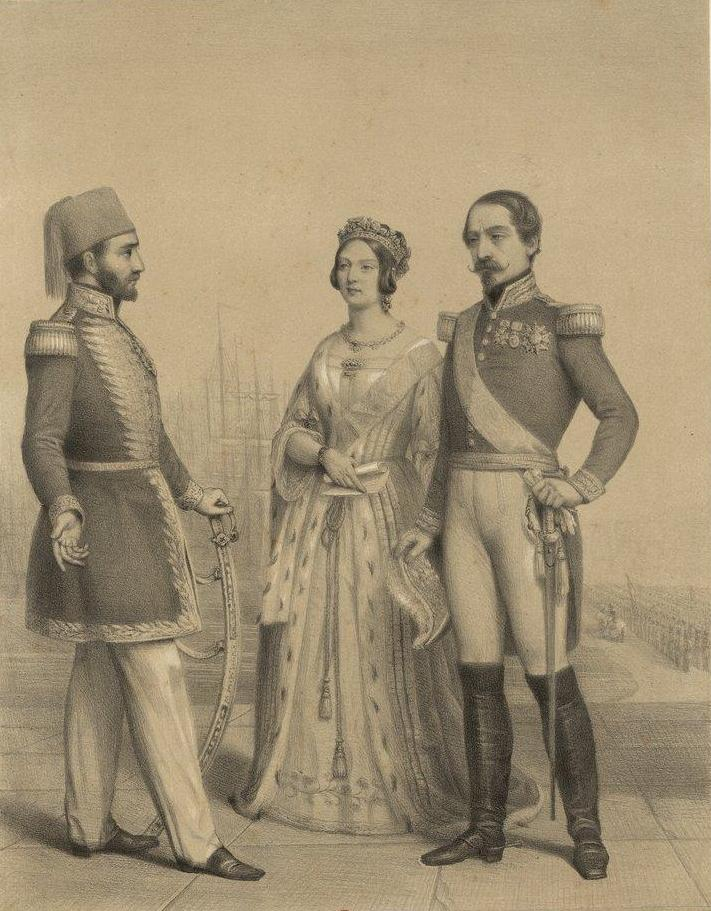
Sultan Abdülmecid (left) with Queen Victoria of the United Kingdom and Emperor Napoleon III of France

==== Crimean War and aftermath ====
On 16 October 1853, the Ottoman Empire entered another war against Russia that would be known as the Crimean War, where it was soon joined by France and Britain. The Ottomans successfully participated in the war and were winning signatories at the Treaty of Paris (1856). The Empire would be inducted into the Concert of Europe. In a compromise with the Great Powers, Abdul Mecid issued another reform edict in February 1856 known as the Imperial Reform Edict (Islâhat Hatt-ı Hümâyûnu), which was perceived by many subjects as relinquishing sovereignty. The Ottoman Empire received the first of its foreign loans on 25 August 1854 during the war. This major foreign loan was followed by those of 1855, 1858 and 1860, which culminated in default and led to the alienation of European sympathy from the Ottoman Empire and indirectly to the later dethronement and death of Abdülmecid's brother Abdülaziz.

Financial troubles and the discontent caused by the wide privileges given to the non-Muslim subjects again led to the empire becoming unstable. His attempts at strengthening his base in the Balkans were overshadowed by incidents that took place in Montenegro in 1858 and Bosnia. In 1861 he was forced to give up Lebanon through the creation of the Mutasarrifate of Mount Lebanon.

Oriental Army of the Crimean campaign by Gustav Bartsch. From left to right: Admiral Ferdinand-Alphonse Hamelin, Lord Lucan, Lord Raglan, Admiral Dundas, Sir John Campbell, Duke of Cambridge, Lord Cardigan, Ismail Pasha, Omer Pasha, Muhlis Pasha (Grigore Sturdza), Sultan Abdülmecid I, Said-Bey (Vasile Obedeanu), Ahmed Pasha, col. Desmaret, Marshal Baraguey d'Hilliers, Prince Napoleon, col. Trochu, Marshal de Saint-Arnaud, general Bosquet, general de Canrobert

The major European states had taken the opportunity to intervene in their own interests. Ottoman statesmen panicked in the face of this situation. The fact that Abdülmecid could not prevent this situation further increased the dissatisfaction caused by the Edict of Tanzimat. The opponents formed the Society of Fedâis, which sought to eliminate Abdülmecid and put Abdulaziz on the throne in order to prevent the European states from acting like a guardian. This revolt attempt, the Kuleli Incident, was suppressed before it even started on 14 September 1859. Meanwhile, the financial situation deteriorated and foreign debts, which were taken under heavy conditions to cover the costs of war, placed a burden on the treasury. All of the debts received from Beyoğlu consumers exceeded eighty million gold liras. Some of the debt securities and hostages were taken by foreign traders and bankers. The Grand Vizier Mehmed Emin Âli Pasha, who criticized this situation harshly, was dismissed by the sultan on 18 October 1859.

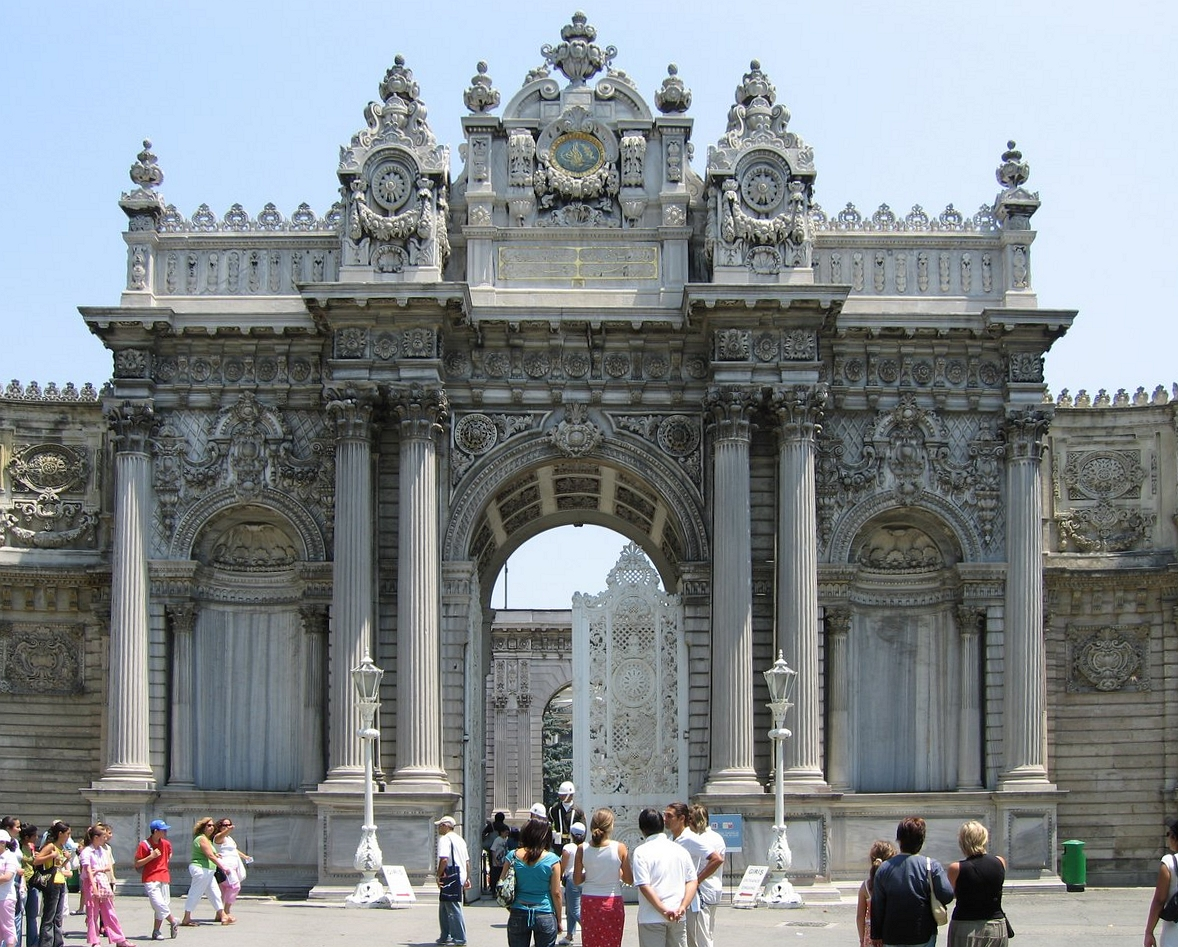
Dolmabahçe Palace, the first European-style palace in Istanbul, was built by Abdülmecid between 1843 and 1856, at a cost of five million Ottoman gold pounds, the equivalent of 35 tons of gold. Fourteen tons of gold was used to adorn the interior ceiling of the palace. The world's largest Bohemian crystal chandelier is in the centre hall. The palace has the largest collection of Bohemian and Baccarat crystal chandeliers in the world, and even the staircases are made of Baccarat crystal.

=== Architecture ===
The Egyptian governor Mehmed Ali Pasha, who came to Istanbul on the official invitation of the sultan on 19 July 1846, was shown privileged hospitality by the sultan and the vükela (government ministers). So much so that the old vizier built the Galata bridge in 1845 so that he could drive between Beșiktaș Palace and Bab-ı Ali.

Although he emphasized his commitment to the ceremonial rules imposed by his ancestors at the ceremonies reflected outside, he adopted radical changes in the life of the palace. For example, he abandoned the Topkapı Palace, which the Ottoman dynasty had used for four centuries, and constructed the more modern Dolmabahçe Palace. Between 1847 and 1849 he had repairs made to the Hagia Sophia mosque. He also founded the first French Theatre in Istanbul.

Many reconstruction activities were also carried out during the reign of Abdülmecid. Palaces and mansions were built with some of the borrowed money. An addition to Dolmabahçe Palace (1853), Beykoz Pavilion (1855), Küçüksu Pavilion (1857), Küçük Mecidiye Mosque (1849), Teşvikiye Mosque (1854) are among the main architectural works of the period. Again in this period, as was done by Bezmiâlem Sultan's Gureba Hospital (1845-1846), the new Galata Bridge was put into service on the same date. In addition, many fountains, mosques, lodges and similar social institutions were repaired or rebuilt.

== Death ==
Abdülmecid died of tuberculosis (like his father) at the age of 38 on 25 June 1861 in Istanbul, and was buried in Yavuz Selim Mosque, and was succeeded by his younger half-brother Sultan Abdulaziz, son of Pertevniyal Sultan. At the time of his death, Abdülmecid had one legal wife and queen consort, Perestu Kadın, and many concubines.

== Personality ==
Abdülmecid was known for his clemency, even refusing to sanction the execution of those who conspired against his life. The 1911 Encyclopædia Britannica says of him, "He bore the character of being a kind and honourable man, if somewhat weak and easily led. Against this, however, must be set down his excessive extravagance, especially towards the end of his life."

== Honours and emblem ==
=== Honours ===
- (Ottoman Empire) 1851: Founder of the Order of the Medjidie;
- (Kingdom of Portugal) 1856: Grand Cross of the Tower and Sword;
- (United Kingdom) 5 November 1856: Stranger Knight of the Garter;
- (Belgium) 20 March 1860: Grand Cordon of the Order of Leopold;
- (Second French Empire) Grand Cross of the Legion of Honour.

=== Garter emblem and arms ===
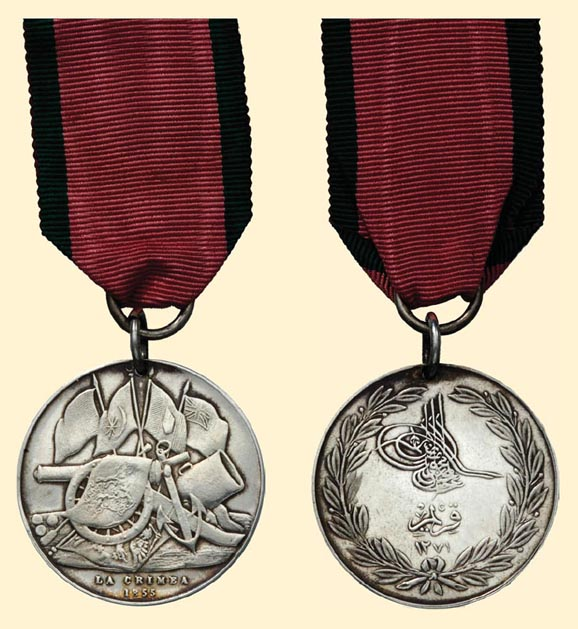
The Crimean War medal issued by Abdülmecid to British, French and Sardinian allied personnel involved in the Crimean War (Sardinian issue)

Abdulmecid created a coat of arms for the Ottoman Empire in 1846, which would be replaced in 1882

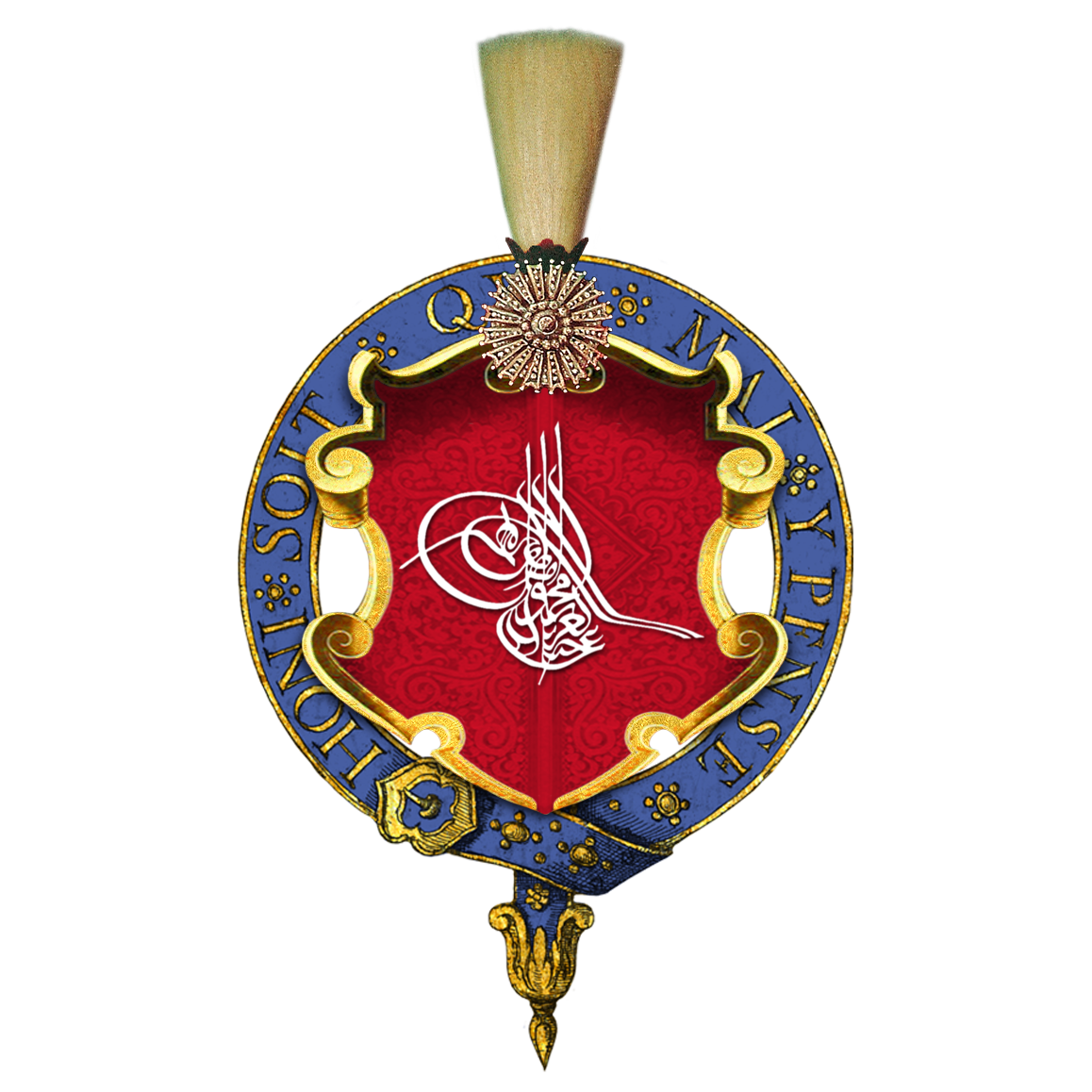
Order of the Garter emblem of Sultan Abdulmecid

== Family ==
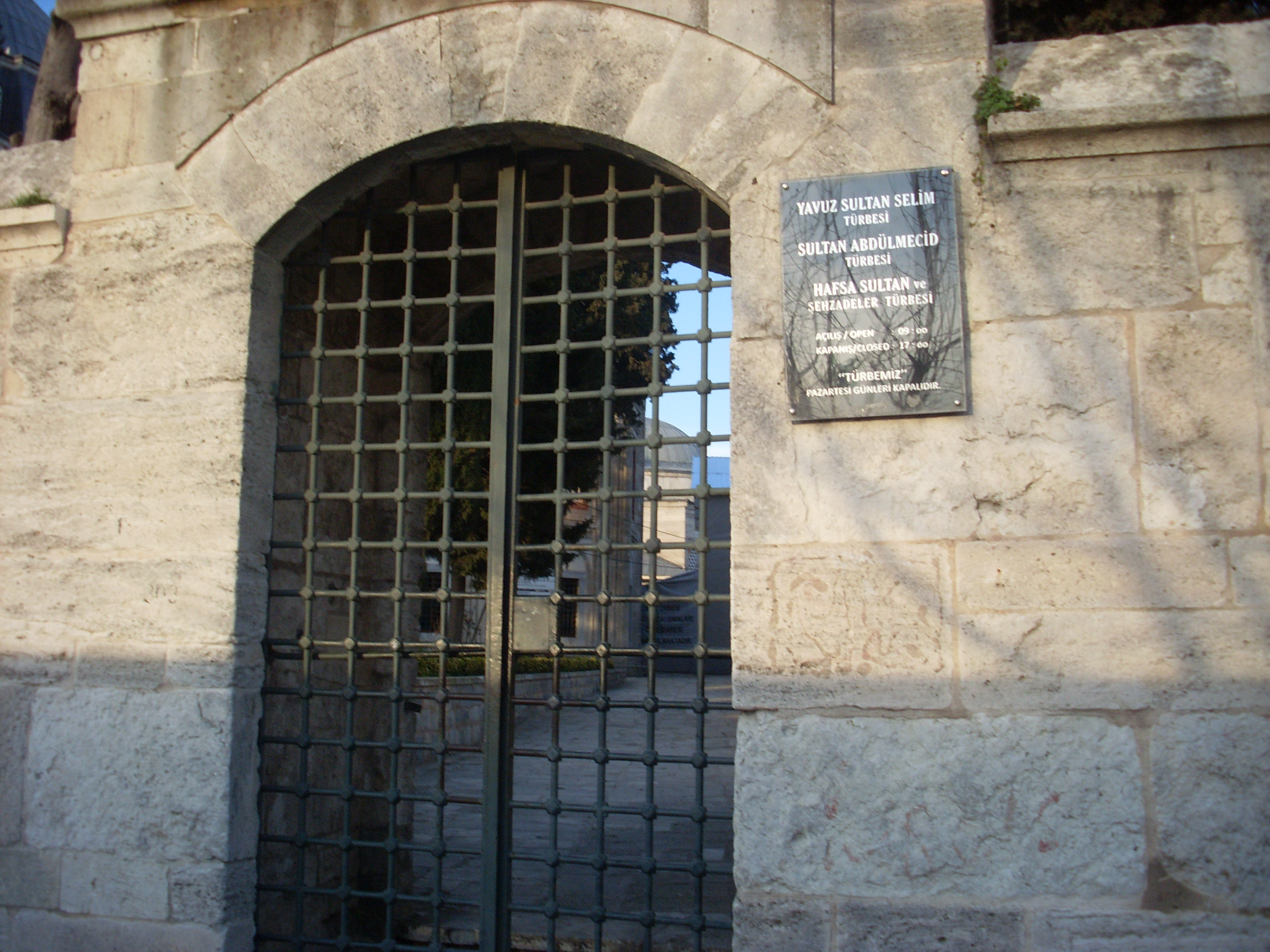
The türbe of Abdülmecid is located inside the Yavuz Selim Mosque in Fatih, Istanbul.

Abdülmecid had one of the most numerous harems of the dynasty. He is known to be the first sultan whose harem was not composed of slave girls but, due to the progressive abolition of slavery in the Ottoman Empire, of girls of free birth, noble or bourgeois, sent to the sultan by the will of the families. He was also the first sultan whose harem assumed a defined hierarchical structure which included four Kadın, followed by four Ikbal, four gözde and a variable number of minor concubines.

=== Consorts ===
Abdülmecid I had at least twenty-six consorts, but only two were legal wives:

- Servetseza Kadin (1823 - 24 September 1878). Başkadin (first consort), born Princess Temruko. She had no children because Abdülmecid was not attracted to her, but he respected and entrusted her to raise his children Mehmed V Reşad, Fatma Sultan and Refia Sultan when they lost their mother. Servetseza loved also Murad V as her own son.
- Hoşyar Kadin (1825 - 1849). Also called Huşyar Kadın. Second Kadın. She was daughter of the Georgian nobleman Zurab Bey Tuskia. She entered the harem in 1839. She had a daughter. Her sister was the third treasurer of the harem and was highly respected. She died in 1849 of turberculosis.
- Şevkefza Kadın (12 December 1820 - 17 September 1889). Second Kadın after Hoşyar's death. She was of Circassian origin and was raised by Nurtab Kadın, a consort of Mahmud II (father of Abdülmecid). She was mother and Valide sultan of Murad V and a daughter.
- Tirimüjgan Kadın (16 October 1819 - 3 October 1852). Third Kadın. She was a Circassian and worked as a palace servant when she was noticed by the sultan and taken as his consort. She was the mother of two sons, including Abdülhamid II, and a daughter.
- Verdicenan Kadın (1825 - 1889). Born Princess Saliha Açba, she married Abdülmecid for political purposes. Mother of a son and daughter and she adopted Mediha Sultan after her mother died. She was the aunt of the famous poet Leyla Açba, who was also her lady-in-waiting.
- Gülcemal Kadin (1826 - 1851). Fourth Kadın. Bosnian, she was the mother of Mehmed V and four daughters.
- Şayan Kadın (1829 - 1860). Fourth Kadın after Gülcemal's death. She was Circassian, born in Sochi, and her mother was a Kucba princess. As a consort she used her power to help the Caucasian refugees. She lived in the palace with her mother. She had no children, but she adopted Behice Sultan when she lost her mother.
- Gülistu Kadın (1830 - 1861). Fourth Kadın after Şayan's death. Called also Gülustu Kadin. Born Princess Fatma Çaçba. She was the favorite daughter-in-law of Bezmiâlem Sultan, Abdülmecid's mother. She was the mother of Mehmed VI and three daughters.
- Rahime Perestu Kadin (1830 - 1906). She was the adopted daughter of Esma Sultan, daughter of Abdülhamid I, and was the first of Abdülmecid's legal wives. Fourth Kadin after Gülistu's death. She had no children, but she was the adoptive mother of Abdülhamid II and Cemile Sultan.
- Bezmiara Kadin (? - 1909). Called also Bezmican or Bezmi. Fifth Kadın, an honorary title that was bestowed upon her as second legal wife. Adopted from a noble family, she never adapted to the harem and divorced the sultan, the first woman to do so. By sultan, she had a daughter who died as newborn. She later married twice more, and had a daughter with her second husband.
- Mahitab Kadin (1830 - 1888). Also called Mehtab Kadın. Chechen, she was one of Abdülmecid's favorite consorts, she was therefore conferred the honorary title of Fifth Kadın. She is the mother of a son and a daughter.
- Düzdidil Hanim (1826 - 18 August 1845). BaşIkbal or Third Kadin. Abkhaz, she had grown up at court under the tutelage of the chief treasurer. She was the mother of four daughters from whom she had to separate because she fell ill with tuberculosis and she had to be isolated and entrusted to her cousin Cican Hanim.
- Nükhetseza Hanim (2 January 1827 - 15 May 1850). BaşIkbal after Düzdidil's death. Abkhazian and Georgian, her true name was Hatice. She was the mother of two sons and two daughters. She died of tuberculosis.
- Neveser Hanim (1841 - 1889). BaşIkbal after Nükhetseza's death. Abkhaza, daughter of the noble Abazin Misost Bey Eşba, her true name was Esma Eşba. She had intense green eyes. She entered the palace in 1853 and was educated there for five years before becoming a consort. She had no children, but adopted Şehzade Mehmed Burhaneddin after his mother's death. A lover of horseback riding, the sultan built a pavilion for her behind the Dolmabahçe Palace where she could rest after her outings, and finally moved there permanently there, while during the reign of Abdülhamid II she occupied a pavilion of the Yıldiz palace. Her niece Şemsinur Hanım entered the service of Emine Nazikeda Kadın, First Consort of Mehmed VI.
- Zeynifelek Hanim (1824 - 20 December 1842). Second Ikbal. Also called Zerrinmelek. Born Princess Klıç, she was abaza. She grew up in the palace with her sister and cousins and was chosen as a consort by Bezmiâlem Sultan. She had a daughter. She died of tuberculosis.
- Nesrin Hanim (1826 - 2 January 1853). Second Ikbal after Zeynifelek's death. She was the daughter of the Georgian nobleman Manuçar Bey Asemiani, she was the mother of three sons and a daughter. She died of pain after three of them died.
- Ceylanyar Hanim (1830 - 27 December 1855). Second Ikbal after Nesrin's death. Circassian, her true name was Nafiye. She was the mother of a son.
- Serfiraz Hanim (1837 - 25 June 1905). Second Ikbal after Ceylanyar's death. Born Princess Ayşe Liah (or Lakh). One of Abdülmecid's favorite consorts, she fell out of favor after a scandal that saw her in love with an Armenian boy. She had two sons and a daughter.
- Nalandil Hanim (1823 - 1865). Third Ikbal or BaşIkbal. Circassian of the Ubuh tribe, she was the daughter of Prince Çıpakue Natikhu Bey. She is the mother of a son and two daughters. Her sister, Terbiye Hanim, was the treasurer of the harem.
- Navekimisal Hanim (1827 - 1854). Fourth Ikbal. Also called Navekivisal. Born Princess Biberd. She had a daughter. She died of tuberculosis.
- Nergizev Hanim (1830 - 26 October 1848/1858). Also called Nergizu Hanim or Nergis Hanim, she was a Circassian from the tribe of Natuhay. Mother of a son, she died of tuberculosis.
- Şayeste Hanim (1838 - 11 February 1912). Abkhaza, Princess Inalipa. She was the mother of a son and daughter, and the adoptive mother of Mehmed VI. She was known to be constantly in debt.
- Çeşmiferah Hanım. No information about her other than her name is kept. Princess Mülkicihan Achba described her as tall and blonde.
- Hüsnicenan Hanim (1818 - 1843). She was Abdülmecid's first concubine, when he was still Şehzade. He set aside her when he ascended the throne. She died of tuberculosis.
- Safderun Hanım (1845 - 1893). Daughter of a Circassian princess. One of her last consorts and one of Abdülmecid's favorites in his later years, fell out of favor after his death: Abdülaziz suspended her salary until 1877 and Abdülhamid II halved it. She died in her home in Kadıköy.
- Yıldız Hanım (1842 - 1880). One of the last consorts and one of Abdülmecid's favorites in his later years. She initially lived in a reserved wing of the Çırağan palace, and then in a reserved pavilion near the Dolmabahçe palace, because she refused to live with his other consorts. She was elder sister of Safinaz Nurefsun Kadın, second consort of Abdülmecid's son Abdülhamid II. The Yıldız Palace built by Abdülhamid II was named in her honor.

=== Sons ===
Abdülmecid had at least nineteen sons:

- Murad V (21 September 1840 - 29 August 1904) - with Şevkefza Kadın. 33rd Sultan of the Ottoman Empire.
- Şehzade Mehmed Ziyaeddin (22 April 1842 - 27 April 1845) - with Nesrin Hanim. Buried in the Yeni Cami.
- Abdülhamid II (21 September 1842 - 10 February 1918) - with Tirimüjgan Kadın. After his mother's death he was adopted by Rahime Perestu Kadin. 34th Sultan of the Ottoman Empire.
- Mehmed V Reşad (2 November 1844 - 3 July 1918) - with Gülcemal Kadin. After his mother's death he was adopted by Servetseza Kadin. 35th Sultan of the Ottoman Empire.
- Şehzade Ahmed (5 June 1846 - 6 June 1846) - with Nükhetseza Hanim. Born in the Çırağan Palace, buried in the Yeni Cami. His father was in Rumelia at the time of his birth, and he came back when he received the news of Ahmed's death.
- Şehzade Mehmed Abid (22 April 1848 - 7 May 1848) - with Tirimüjgan Kadın. Born in the Çırağan Palace, buried in the Yeni Cami.
- Şehzade Mehmed Fuad (7 July 1848 - 28 September 1848) - with Nergivez Hanim. Born in the Çırağan Palace, buried in the Yeni Cami.
- Şehzade Ahmed Kemaleddin (16 July 1848 - 25 April 1905) - with Verdicenan Kadin. He had a consort and two daughters.
- Şehzade Mehmed Burhaneddin (23 May 1849 - 4 November 1876) - with Nükhetseza Hanim. After his mother's death he was adopted by Neverser Hanim. He married three times and had a son and a daughter.
- Şehzade Mehmed Vamik (19 April 1850 - 6 August 1850) - unknown mother. Buried in the Yeni Cami.
- Şehzade Mehmed Bahaeddin (24 June 1850 - 9 November 1852) - with Nesrin Hanim. Twin of Şehzade Nizameddin. Buried in the Yeni Cami.
- Şehzade Mehmed Nizameddin (24 June 1850 - 1852) - with Nesrin Hanim. Twin of Şehzade Bahaeddin. Buried in the Yeni Cami.
- Şehzade Ahmed Nureddin (31 March 1852 - 3 January 1884) - with Mahitab Kadın. He married once, but had no issue.
- Şehzade Mehmed Rüşdi (31 March 1852 - 5 December 1852) - with Ceylanyar Hanim. Born in the Çırağan Palace, buried in the Abdülhamid I mausoleum.
- Şehzade Osman Safiyeddin (9 June 1852 - 2 July 1855) - with Serfiraz Hanim. Born in the Çırağan Palace, buried in the Yavuz Selim mosque.
- Şehzade Abdullah (3 February 1853 - 3 February 1853) - with Şayeste Hanim.
- Şehzade Mehmed Abdülsamed (20 March 1853 - 5 May 1855) - with Nalandil Hanim. Buried in the Yavuz Selim mosque.
- Şehzade Selim Süleyman (25 July 1860 - 16 July 1909) - with Serfiraz Hanim. He had five consorts, two sons and a daughter.
- Mehmed VI Vahideddin (14 January 1861 - 16 May 1926) - with Gülistu Kadın. Orphan by birth, he was adopted by Şayeste Hanim. 36th and last Sultan of the Ottoman Empire.

=== Daughters ===
Abdülmecid I had at least twenty-seven daughters:

- Mevhibe Sultan (9 May 1840 - 9 February 1841) - with Hoşyar Kadin. Buried in Abdülhamid I türbe.
- Naime Sultan (11 October 1840 - 1 May 1843) - with Tirimüjgan Kadın. Born in the Topkapi Palace, buried in Mustafa III türbe.
- Fatma Sultan (1 November 1840 - 26 August 1884) - with Gülcemal Kadin. After her mother's death she was adopted by Servetseza Kadın. She married twice and had a son and two daughters.
- Behiye Sultan (22 February 1841 - 3 June 1847) - with Zeynifelek Hanim. Called also Behi Sultan. Buried in Yeni Cami.
- Neyire Sultan (13 October 1841 - 14 January 1844) - with Düzdidil Hanim. Twin of Münire Sultan. Born in the Beşiktaş Palace, buried in Nurosmaniye.
- Münire Sultan (13 October 1841 - 18 December 1841) - with Düzdidil Hanim. Twin of Neyire Sultan. Born in the Beşiktaş Palace, buried in Nurosmaniye.
- Aliye Sultan (1842 - 1842) - with Nükhetseza Hanim. Born in the Çırağan Palace.
- Hatice Sultan (7 February 1842 - 1842) - with Gülcemal Kadin. Twin of Refia Sultan.
- Refia Sultan (7 February 1842 - 4 January 1880) - with Gülcemal Kadin. Twin sister of Hatice Sultan. After her mother's death she was adopted by Servetseza Kadın. She married once and had a daughter.
- Aliye Sultan (20 October 1842 - 10 July 1845) - with Şevkefza Kadın. Born in the Beşiktaş Palace, buried in Yeni Cami.
- Cemile Sultan (17 August 1843 - 26 February 1915) - with Düzdidil Hanim. After her mother's death she was adopted by Rahime Perestu Kadın. She married once and had three sons and three daughters.
- Münire Sultan (9 December 1844 - 29 June 1862) - with Verdicenan Kadin. She married twice.
- Samiye Sultan (23 February 1845 - 15 April 1845) - with Düzdidil Hanim. Born in the Topkapi Palace, buried in Yeni Cami.
- Fatma Nazime Sultan (26 November 1847 - 1 December 1847) - with Nükhetseza Hanim. Born in the Beylerbeyi Palace, buried in Yeni Cami.
- Sabiha Sultan (15 April 1848 - 27 April 1849) - with Mahitab Kadin. Born in the Çırağan Palace, buried in Yeni Cami.
- Behice Sultan (6 August 1848 - 30 November 1876) - with Nesrin Hamın. After her mother's death she was adopted by Şayan Kadin. She married Halil Hamid Paşazade Hamid Bey but died of tuberculosis only 14 days after the wedding.
- Mukbile Sultan (9 February 1850 - 25 February 1850) - with Bezmiara Kadin. Born in the Çırağan Palace, buried in Yeni Cami.
- Rukiye Sultan (1850 - 1850) - with Gülcemal Kadın.
- Seniha Sultan (5 December 1851 - 15 September 1931) - with Nalandil Hanım. She married once and had two sons.
- Zekiye Sultan (26 February 1855 - 19 February 1856) - with Gülistu Kadın. Twin of Fehime Sultan. Buried in Gülistu Kadın türbe.
- Fehime Sultan (26 February 1855 - 10 November 1856) - with Gülistu Kadın. Twin of Zekiye Sultan. Buried in Gülistu Kadın türbe.
- Şehime Sultan (1 March 1855 - 21 May 1857) - with Nalandil Hanim. Born in the Beylerbeyi Palace, buried in Gülistu Kadın türbe.
- Mediha Sultan (30 July 1856 - 9 November 1928) - with Gülistu Kadin. Adopted by Verdicenan Kadın After her mother's death. She married twice and had a son.
- Naile Sultan (30 September 1856 - 18 January 1882) - with Şayeste Hanım. Called also Nadile Sultan. She married once without issue.
- Bedihe Sultan (30 September 1857 - 12 July 1858) - with Serfiraz Hanım. Also called Bedia Sultan. Born in the Beşiktaş Palace, buried in Gülistu Kadın türbe.
- Atiyetullah Sultan (16 December 1858 - 1858).
- Behiye Sultan (30 May 1860 - 1860).

== In fiction ==
- A fictionalized version of Abdülmecid I appears in the 2008 novel The Bellini Card, by Jason Goodwin.

== Sources ==
- Brookes, Douglas Scott (2010). The Concubine, the Princess, and the Teacher: Voices from the Ottoman Harem. University of Texas Press. ISBN 978-0-292-78335-5.
- Küçük, Cevdet (1988). "Abdülmeci̇d". TDV Encyclopedia of Islam, Vol. 1 (Âb-ı Hayat – El-ahkâmü'ş-şer'i̇yye) (in Turkish). Istanbul: Presidency of Religious Affairs, Centre for Islamic Studies. pp. 259–263. ISBN 978-975-954-801-8.
- Uluçay, M. Çağatay (2011). Padişahların kadınları ve kızları. Ötüken. ISBN 978-9-754-37840-5.
- Sakaoğlu, Necdet (2015). Bu Mülkün Sultanları. Alfa Yayıncılık. ISBN 978-6-051-71080-8.
- Paşa, Ahmed Cevdet (1960). Tezâkir. [2]. 13 - 20, Volume 2. Türk Tarih Kurumu Basımevi.
- Hamlin, Cyrus (2013). Among the Turks. Bogaziçi Üniversitesi Yayinevi. ISBN 978-6054787159.

Abdülmecid I House of Osman Born: 23 April 1823 Died: 25 June 1861
Regnal titles
Preceded by Mahmud II	Sultan of the Ottoman Empire; 2 July 1839 – 25 June 1861	Succeeded by Abdulaziz
Sunni Islam titles
Preceded by Mahmud II	Caliph of the Ottoman Caliphate; 2 July 1839 – 25 June 1861	Succeeded by Abdulaziz
