= Ikbal (title) =

Ottoman imperial title

Ikbal (Ottoman Turkish: اقبال) was the title given to the imperial consort of the sultan of the Ottoman Empire, who came below the rank of kadın.

== Etymology ==
The word ikbal (اقبال) is an Arabic word, which means good fortune, or lucky. Historians have translated it either 'fortunate one' or 'favorite'.

== Ranks and titles ==
An ikbal was a titled consort, and recognised as such by the sultan. The number of ikbals varied. They were ranked as baş ikbal ("first ikbal, first favourite, first fortunate one"), ikinci ikbal ("second ikbal, second favourite, second fortunate one"), üçüncü ikbal ("third ikbal, third favourite, third fortunate one"), dördüncü ikbal ("fourth ikbal, fourth favourite, fourth fortunate one"), and so on, according to the order in which they had caught the sultan's eye, and elevated to that position.

The ikbals usually held the prefix titles of iffetlü ("honest"), and ismetlü ("virtuous"), and the suffix titles of hatun and hanım.

== Status ==
=== Eighteenth century ===
The rank first appeared toward the end of the seventeenth century, during the reign of Sultan Mustafa II (reigned 1695–1703). Two 18th-century sultans Mahmud I (reigned 1730–1754), and Mustafa III (reigned 1757–1773), also had ikbals.

However, in the 18th century, the ikbals held the title kalfa which means 'assistant master, mistress'. This suggests that at that time they were eligible for both kinds of high level harem career. They also appeared in the list of cariyes, which did not include the sultan's kadıns, or the ketkhüda kadın, or daye hatun, emphasizes their identity as part of the household rather than family in the 18th century. In the nineteenth century the term kalfa appears to have been used exclusively for members of the household staff.

In the 18th century, the ikbals had personal servants, and were paid 250 kuruş every three months.

=== Nineteenth century ===
This tradition of naming ikbals continued until the nineteenth century. The ikbals were chosen from among the gediklis. Each ikbal had her "night turn" (nöbet gecesi). and a stipend of 20,000 kuruş. They had personal servants. and wore rich fabrics, and in winter stuffed dresses that reflected their high status in the harem hierarchy.

Ikbals resided in their own apartments, or sometimes isolated kiosks. In the nineteenth century, they each had two rooms on the second floor of the palace, one facing the Bosphorus Strait and serving as a saloon, and the other facing the palace gardens and serving as a bedroom. The sultan visited an ikbal if she was sick or if she had children.

Although previously it was thought that after an ikbal became pregnant she was promoted to the rank of kadın, this was not always the case. Eric Newby states that after an ikbal gave birth she was elevated to the title of haseki, and that the kadinefendis were four favourites who had each given birth to a male heir.). If four kadıns had already been named, and ikbal could only become a kadın if one of the kadıns died or was divorced. If that happened, the senior ikbal assumed the status of kadın. Upon the death of a sultan, any ikbal who had a living child would retire to the Old Palace. The others would be given in marriage to statesmen.

The ikbals were subjected to the same law of inheritance as the other women in the harem. However, they were usually buried in places of honour.

== Honorific ==
Imperial consorts who were traditionally addressed as ikbal include:

- Nükhetsezâ Hanım (1827–1850), wife of sultan Abdulmejid I
- Navekmisal Hanım (1827–1854), wife of sultan Abdulmejid I
- Şayeste Hanım (1836–1912), wife of sultan Abdulmejid I
- Serfiraz Hanım (1837–1905), wife of sultan Abdulmejid I
- Müşfika Kadın (1867–1961), wife of sultan Abdul Hamid II
- Peyveste Hanım (1873–1943), wife of sultan Abdul Hamid II
- Fatma Pesend Hanım (1876–1928), wife of sultan Abdul Hamid II
- Behice Hanım (1882–1969), wife of sultan Abdul Hamid II
- Nevvare Hanım (1901–1992), wife of sultan Mehmed VI
- Nevzad Hanım (1902–1992), wife of sultan Mehmed VI

== See also ==
- Cariye
- List of Ottoman titles and appellations
- Haseki Sultan
- Hatun
- Kadın (title)
- Valide Sultan

== Sources ==
- Davis, Fanny (1986). The Ottoman Lady: A Social History from 1718 to 1918. Greenwood Publishing Group. ISBN 978-0-313-24811-5.
- Brookes, Douglas Scott (2010). The Concubine, the Princess, and the Teacher: Voices from the Ottoman Harem. University of Texas Press. ISBN 978-0-292-78335-5.
- Argit, Betül Ipsirli (October 29, 2020). Life after the Harem: Female Palace Slaves, Patronage and the Imperial Ottoman Court. Cambridge University Press. ISBN 978-1-108-48836-5.
- Sancar, Asli (2007). Ottoman Women: Myth and Reality. Light, Incorporated. ISBN 978-1-597-84115-3.
- Peirce, Leslie P. (1993). The Imperial Harem: Women and Sovereignty in the Ottoman Empire. Oxford University Press. ISBN 978-0-195-08677-5.
