= Hıfzı Topuz =

Turkish journalist, travel writer and novelist (1923–2023)

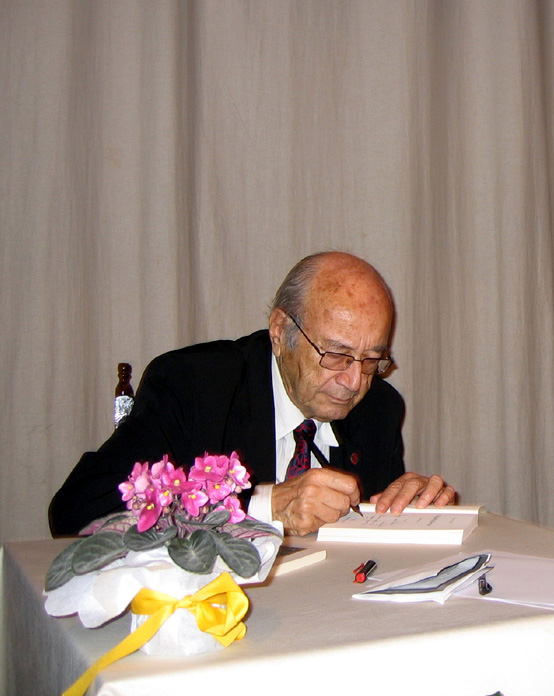
- Topuz in 2008
- Born: 25 January 1923; Istanbul, Turkey
- Died: 26 September 2023 (aged 100); Istanbul, Turkey
- Education: Law, journalism
- Alma mater: Istanbul University, University of Strasbourg
- Writing career
- Genres: Travel writing, novel, non-fiction

Hıfzı Topuz (25 January 1923 – 26 September 2023) was a Turkish journalist, travel writer and novelist. He also served as a lecturer on journalism at several universities.

== Early life ==
Topuz was born on 25 January 1923 in Istanbul. After finishing his secondary education at the Galatasaray High School in 1942, he studied law at Istanbul University, graduating in 1948. Later, he went to France, where he attended University of Strasbourg to conduct further studies in international law and journalism between 1957 and 1959. In 1960, he earned a doctoral degree in journalism from the same university.

== Professional career ==
After graduating from Istanbul University, Topuz entered journalism, and was employed between 1948 and 1957 at the daily newspaper Akşam, where he worked as a reporter and later as an editor. He co-founded Istanbul Journalists' Union, and served as its leader.

During his time in France, he applied for a vacant post at the headquarters of UNESCO in Paris. He worked as a travelling reporter for the organization between 1959 and 1983. He was responsible for projects like professional coordination between international organizations of journalism, journalism ethics and standards, journalism education and security of journalists. Topuz conducted seminars on journalism education in African countries, India and the Philippines. He developed rural area journalism project in Black Africa.

While in Paris, Topuz interviewed for the Turkish daily newspapers notable people like painter Fikret Mualla (1903–1967), poet Nazım Hikmet (1902–1963), journalist Zekeriya Sertel (1890–1980), painter Abidin Dino (1913–1993)), painter Nejat Devrim (1923–1995) and General Nikolaos Trikoupis (1869–1956), who commanded Greek troops during the Turkish War of Independence and became a prisoner of war.

Topuz planned in 1962 at the headquarters of UNESCO a project to establish the "College of Communications" (as its title then Turkish: Basın-Yayın Yüksek Okulu) at the University of Ankara.

Invited by İsmail Cem İpekçi, the newly appointed head of the state-owned Turkish Radio and Television Corporation (TRT), he returned in 1974 to Turkey to lead the radio channels of TRT until 1975.

In 1986, Topuz founded the "İletişim Araştırmaları Derneği" (İLAD) (literally: Communications Research Association), and became their president.

Topuz wrote for the daily newspapers Vatan, Milliyet and Cumhuriyet and some magazines. He also taught lectures on press, history of radio-television, international communication and political communication at the communications faculties of Anadolu University, Galatasaray University and Istanbul University.

== Writer ==
Topuz wrote non-fiction on communications in addition to biographies, travel books and novels. He opened a new field in the Turkish literature by choosing the subject matters of his novels from history or historical figures.

== Death ==
Topuz died on 26 September 2023, at the age of 100.

== Awards ==
Topuz was honored in 1998 with the "Sertel Demokrasi Ödülü" (Sertel Democracy Award). He received in 2007 the "Orhan Kemal Roman Armağanı" (Orhan Kemal Novel Prize) for his work Başın Öne Eğilmesin. The "Afrika Diplomatik Akademisi" (ADA) (Africa Diplomatic Academy) awarded him in 2008 with its "Peace and Friendship Prize". In 2009, the "Çağdaş Gazetecier Derneği" (Association of Contemporary Journalists) awarded him with its "Honor Prize".

== Bibliography ==
Non-fiction

- Basin sözlüğü: Fransızcadan Türkçeye Fransızcaya, İngilizce karşılıklı (1968) Yenilik Basımevi, 111pp
- 100 soruda Türk basın tarihi (1973) Gerc̦ek Yayınev, 270pp
- Seçim savaşları: televizyon, radyo, basın ve afişle (1977) Milliyet, 134pp
- Uluslararası İletişim (1984) Anadolu Üniversitesi, 243pp
- Cumhuriyetʹin beş dönemeci (with Hüsamettin Ünsal) (1984) Sergi Yayınevi, 199pp
- İletişimde karikatür ve toplum (1986) Anadolu Üniversitesi, 109pp
- Basında tekelleşmeler (1989) İLAD, 111pp
- Yarının radyo ve televizyon düzeni: özgür, özerk ve çoğulcu bir alternatif (1990) İLAD, 191pp
- Türkiye'de sec̦im kampanyaları (1991) Türkiye Sosyal Ekonomik Siyasal Araștırmalar Vakfı, 85pp
- Siyasal reklamcılık: dünyadan ve Türkiye'den örneklerle (1991) Cem Yayınevi, 248pp ISBN 975-406-320-6, ISBN 978-975-406-320-2
- Seçimlerde iletişim politikaları (1991) TüSES, 230pp
- Kara Afrika sanatı (1992) Ant, 96pp
- Türk Basın Tarihi: II. Mahmut'tan holdinglere (1996) Remzi Kitabevi, 470pp
- Başlangıcından Bugüne Dünya Karikatürü (1997) İnkılâp Kitabevi, 264pp
- Dünyada ve Türkiye'de kültür politikaları (1998) Adam, 86pp

Biographies

- Konuklar geçiyor: TV'de "Her hafta bir konuk" programındaki konuşmalar, anılar (1975) Çağdaş Yayınları, 237pp
- Lumumba: Kara Afrikd̓a işkenceyle öldürülen ilk Başbakan (1987) Yön Yayıncılık, 199pp
- Paris'te son Osmanlılar: Mediha Sultan ve Damat Ferit (1999) Remzi Kitabevi (reprint 2005), 302pp ISBN 975-14-0722-2, ISBN 978-975-14-0722-1
- Hatice Sultan (2001) Remzi Kitabevi, 246pp ISBN 975-14-0774-5, ISBN 978-975-14-0774-0
- Nâzïm Hikmet: vivre comme un arbre, seul et libre, vivre en frères comme les arbres d'une forêt (2002) Turquoise, 335pp
- Gazi ve Fikriye (2006) Edition Orient, 286pp ISBN 975-14-0822-9, ISBN 978-975-14-0822-8
- Fikret Muallâ: anılar, resimler, fotoğraflar (2005) Everest Yayınları, 359pp ISBN 975-289-238-8, ISBN 978-975-289-238-5
- Abidin Dino: İkinci kitap, 1942–1952 (2008) Kitap Yayınevi
- Abdülmecit: İmparatorluk Çökerken Sarayda 22 Yıl (2009) Remzi Kitabevi, 205pp ISBN 9751413575
- Bana Atatürk'ü anlattılar (2010) Remzi Kitabevi, 167pp ISBN 975-14-1390-7, ISBN 978-975-14-1390-1

Travel books

- Kara Afrika (1971) Milliyet yayınları, 348pp
- Parisli yıllar (1994) Bilgi Yayinevi, 302pp
- Elveda Afrika-Hoşça Kal Paris (2005) Remzi Kitabevi, 462pp ISBN 9751410231, ISBN 9789751410238
- Nişantaşı Anıları (2009) Heyamola Yayınları, 134pp ISBN 6054307215, ISBN 9786054307210

Novels

- Taif’te Ölüm (2000) Remzi Kitabevi, 255pp ISBN 975-14-0677-3, ISBN 978-975-14-0677-4
- Meyyâle (1998) Remzi Kitabevi (reprint 2001), 224pp ISBN 975-14-0627-7, ISBN 978-975-14-0627-9
- Eski Dostlar (2000) Remzi Kitabevi, 270pp ISBN 9751407524, ISBN 978-9751407528
- Milli Mücadele'de Çamlıca'nın üç gülü (2002) Remzi Kitabevi, 287pp ISBN 975-14-0894-6, ISBN 978-975-14-0894-5
- Devrim yılları (2004) Remzi kitabevi, 287pp ISBN
- Tavcan: savaş yıllarında kültür devrimi roman (2005) Remzi Kitabevi, 221pp ISBN 9751410681
- Başın Öne Eğilmesin: Sabahattin Ali'nin romanı (2006) Remzi Kitabevi, 264pp ISBN 9751411505
- Özgürlüğe Kurşun (2007) Edition Orient, 254pp ISBN 975-14-1224-2, ISBN 978-975-14-1224-9
- Kara çığlık: Afrika'da başkaldırı ve aşk (2008) Remzi Kitabevi, 228pp ISBN 975-14-1302-8, ISBN 978-975-14-1302-4
