= Şehzade Ahmed Nureddin (son of Abdul Hamid II) =

Ottoman prince, the son of Sultan Abdul Hamid II (1900 or 1901–1945)

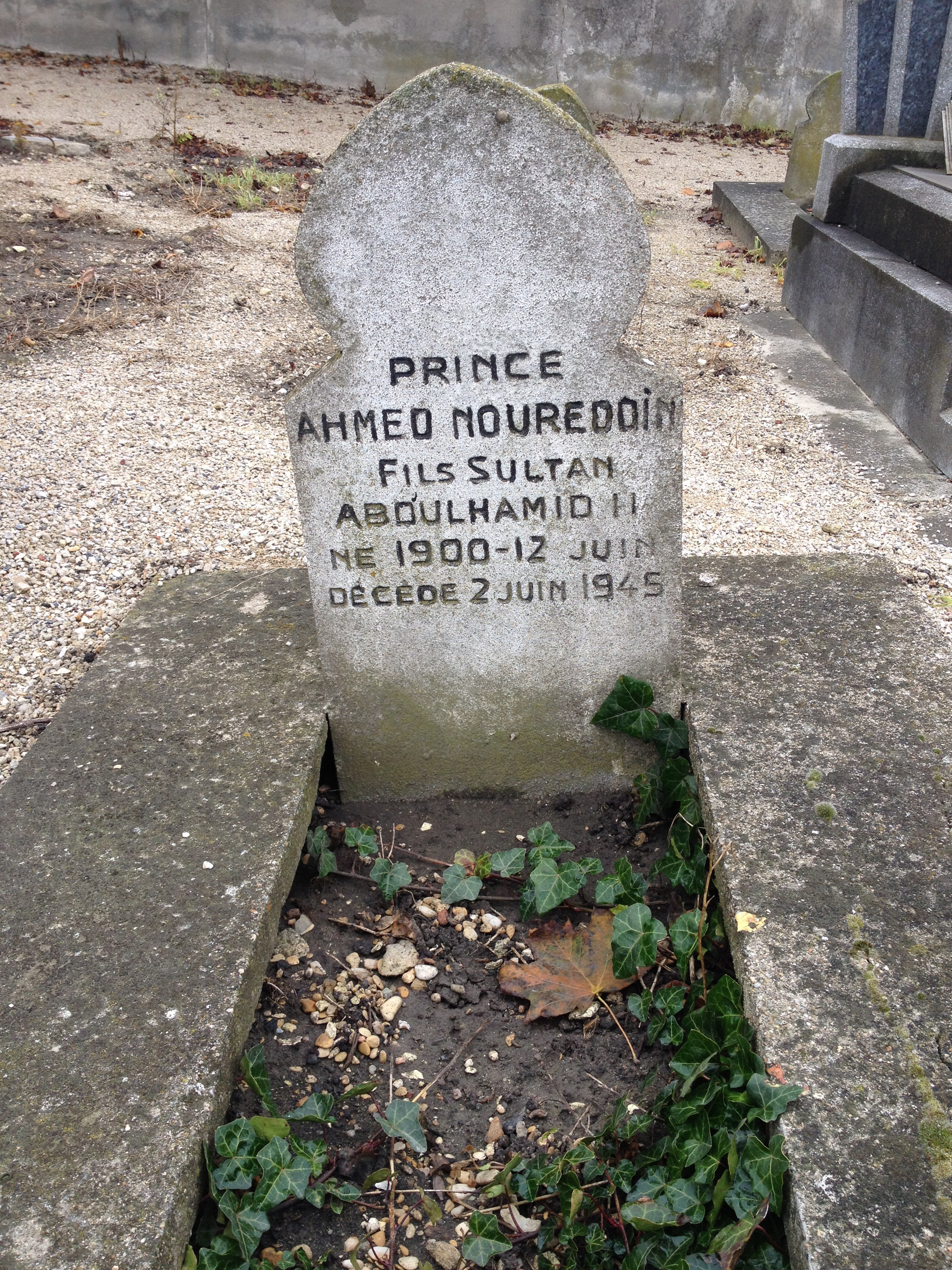
- Born: 12 June 1900; Yıldız Palace, Constantinople, Ottoman Empire (now Istanbul, Turkey)
- Died: 2 June 1945 (aged 44); Paris, France
- Burial: Bobigny cemetery
- Spouse: Ayşe Andelib Hanım (m. 1919)
- Issue: Şehzade Mehmed Bedreddin
Names
- Turkish: Şehzade Ahmed Nureddin; Ottoman Turkish: شہزادہ احمد نورالدین
- Dynasty: Ottoman
- Father: Abdul Hamid II
- Mother: Behice Hanım
- Religion: Sunni Islam
- Military career
- Allegiance: Ottoman Empire
- Branch: Ottoman Army
- Rank: See list

Şehzade Ahmed Nureddin Efendi (Ottoman Turkish: شہزادہ احمد نورالدین; 12 June 1900 – June 1945) was an Ottoman prince, the son of Sultan Abdul Hamid II and his consort Behice Hanım.

== Early life ==
Şehzade Ahmed Nureddin was born on 22 June 1901 in the Yıldız Palace. His father was Abdul Hamid II, son of Abdulmejid I and Tirimüjgan Kadın. His mother was Behice Hanım, daughter of Albus Bey Maan and Nazli Hanım Kuçba. He had a twin brother, Şehzade Mehmed Bedreddin who died in childhood in 1903. He was the sixth son born to his father. He was named after his decreased uncle, Şehzade Ahmed Nureddin (1852 – 1884).

On 27 April 1909, Abdul Hamid II was deposed, and sent into exile in Thessaloniki. Nureddin, however, remained in Istanbul. He and his mother first settled in with his eldest half-sister Zekiye Sultan, then in his maternal grandparents house in Beşiktaş, and finally in the Maslak Palace in 1911. After Thessaloniki fell to Greece in 1912, Abdul Hamid also returned to Istanbul, and settled in the Beylerbeyi Palace, where he died in 1918.

== Education and career ==
In October 1902 he was registered in the Ertuğrul cavalry regiment. In December 1908, he was enrolled in the Ottoman Military College. In March 1915, he was enrolled in Galatasaray High School. In 1916, he was sent to Germany, where he studied at the Potsdam Military Academy. He went onto serve as Cavalry Lieutenant in the imperial Ottoman army.

He had learned music from Arenda Pasha. He was also a composer and painter.

== Personal life ==
Nureddin's only wife was Ayşe Andelib Hanım. She was born on 2 August 1902 in Adapazarı. Her father was Hüseyin Hüsnü Pasha Akintsba (1860 – 1915), and her mother was Fatma Şadiye Ezerakın (1868 – 15 August 1937). She had two brothers, Mahmud Celaleddin Akıncıgil, who was a kethüda to her mother-in-law Behice Hanım, and Mehmed Sadreddin Özerakin, and one sister, Hatice Kudsiye Özerakin. The two first met at the Yıldız Park, while Andelib was collecting donations for the Hilal-i Ahmer Association.

They married on 5 May 1919 in the Maslak Palace. At the exile of the imperial family in 1924, she followed her husband to Paris, France, where she gave birth to the couple's only child, a son, Şehzade Mehmed Bedreddin, who died young in Paris. After the prince's death in 1944, she returned to Turkey. In accordance to the Surname Law, she took the surname "Özerakin". She died on 15 July 1980 in Dutluk Sokağı, Beşiktaş, Istanbul, and was buried in Kulaksız cemetery, Sütlüce.

== Life in exile and death ==
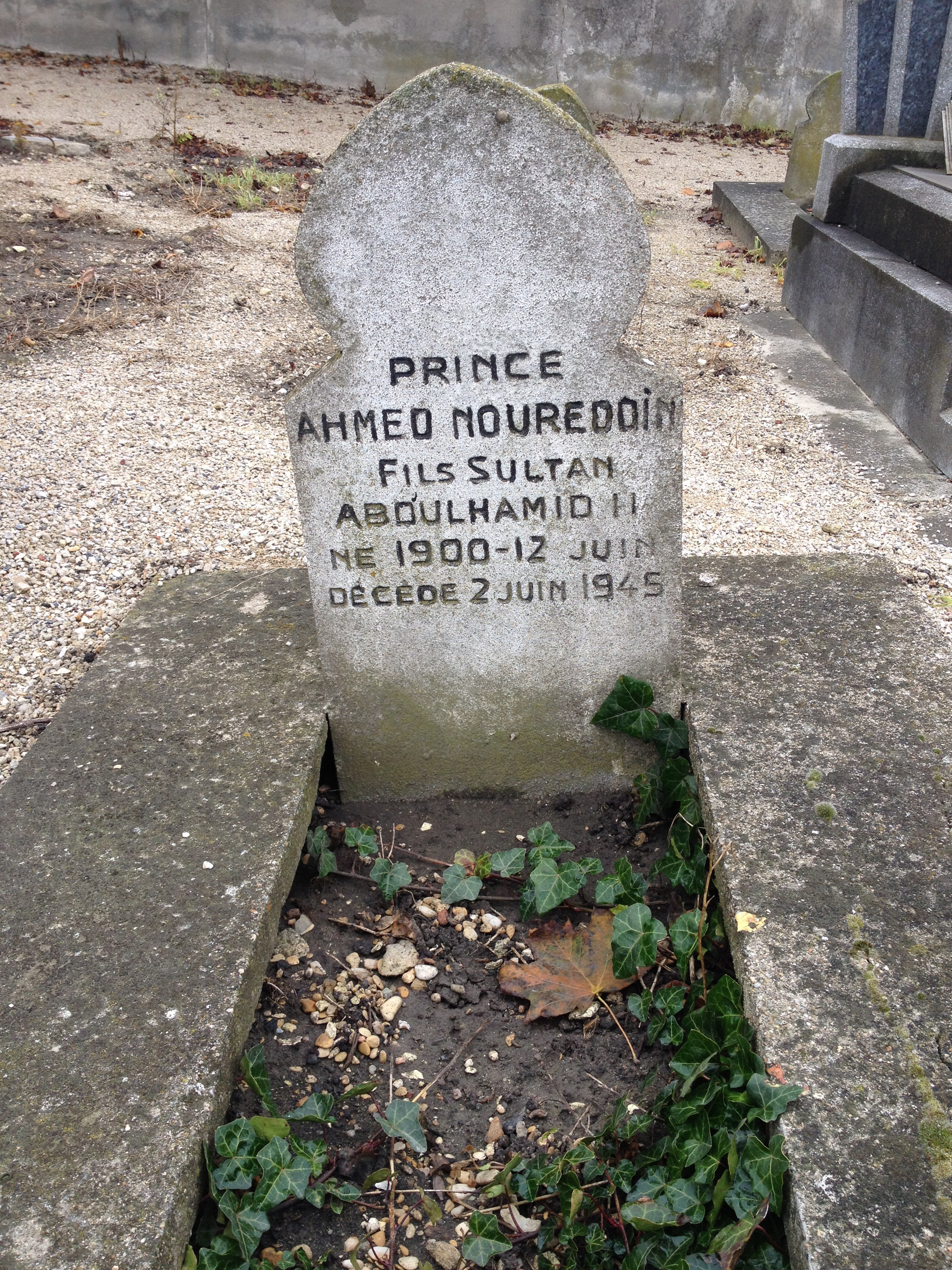
Grave of Nureddin Efendi, Bobigny Graveyard, Paris

At the exile of the imperial family in March 1924, Nureddin, his wife, and his tutor Halil Bey settled in Naples, Italy. He was later joined by his mother and brother-in-law, Celaleddin Bey. On 14 January 1925, he gave the power of attorney to Sami Günzberg, a well-known Turkish Jewish lawyer, authorising him to regain from usurpers buildings, lands, mines, concessions left by Abdul Hamid situated in Turkish territory and elsewhere.

When they ran out of money, they made a living by selling his mother's or wife's jewelry. His maternal grandmother also used to send a small amount of money from time to time. However, with time it became difficult to making a living, and so he went to Paris find work. During this time he lived with his elder half-sister Şadiye Sultan. Unable to find a suitable job, he made a living by playing piano and drums for three or five kuruş in cafes. He died in June 1945, and was buried in Bobigny cemetery.

== Honours ==
Styles of Şehzade Ahmed Nureddin
- Reference style: His Imperial Highness
- Spoken style: Your Imperial Highness

- Order of the House of Osman, Jeweled, May 1917
- Order of Osmanieh, Jeweled
- Order of the Medjidie, Jeweled
- Liakat War Medal in Gold
- Imtiyaz War Medal in Gold

=== Military appointments ===
Military ranks and army appointments

- Cavalry Lieutenant, Ottoman Army

== Issue ==
Name	Birth	Death	Notes
Şehzade Mehmed Bedreddin	after 1925	—N/a	Named after his father's twin. Born and died young in Paris, France

== In popular culture ==
- In the 2017 TV series Payitaht: Abdülhamid, Şehzade Ahmed Nureddin is portrayed by Turkish actor Alp Akar.

== Sources ==
- Ekinci, Ekrem Buğra (March 31, 2017). Sultan Abdülhamid'in Son Zevcesi. Timaş Tarih. ISBN 978-6-050-82503-9.
- Osmanoğlu, Ayşe (2000). Babam Sultan Abdülhamid. Mona Kitap Yayinlari. ISBN 978-6-050-81202-2.
