= Refia Sultan =

Refia Sultan may refer to:

- Refia Sultan (daughter of Abdulmejid I) (1842-1880), Ottoman princess
- Refia Sultan (daughter of Abdul Hamid II) (1891-1938), Ottoman princess
