= Sazkar Hanım =

Consort of Ottoman Sultan Abdul Hamid II (1873-c.1945)

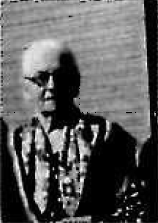
- Born: Zekiye Maan; 8 May 1873; Kayalar, Adapazarı, Istanbul, Ottoman Empire
- Died: c. 1945 (aged 71–72); Damascus, Syria
- Burial: Cemetery of the Sulaymaniyya Takiyya, Damascus, Syria
- Spouse: Abdul Hamid II (m. 1890; died 1918)
- Issue: Refia Sultan
Names
- Turkish: Fatma Zekiye Sazkar Hanım; Ottoman Turkish: سازکار خانم
- House: Maan (by birth); Ottoman (by marriage)
- Father: Recep Bata Maan
- Mother: Rukiye Havva Hanım
- Religion: Sunni Islam

Sazkar Hanım (Ottoman Turkish: سازکار خانم, "harmony"; born Fatma Zekiye Maan; 8 May 1873 – c. 1945) was the ninth consort of Sultan Abdul Hamid II of the Ottoman Empire.

== Early life ==
Sazkar Hanım was born on 8 May 1873 in Kayalar, Adapazarı, Istanbul. Born as Fatma Zekiye Maan, she was a member of an Abkhazian noble family, Maan. Her father was Recep Bata Bey Maan, the son of Osman Bey Maan, and grandson of Kats Bey Maan. Her mother was Rukiye Havva Hanım Mikanba, an Abkhazian. She was the first cousin of Behice Hanım, twelfth consort of Sultan Abdul Hamid.

She was presented in the imperial harem by Çorlulizade Mahmud Celaleddin Pasha's Abkhazian consort, Bidar Hanım. Sazkar was tall, with blonde hair and light blue-green eyes.

== Marriage ==
Sazkar Hanım married Abdul Hamid in 1890 in the Yıldız Palace. She was given the title of "BaşIkbal". On 15 June 1891, a year after the marriage, she gave birth to her only child, a daughter, Refia Sultan. Sazkar became close friends with Peyveste Hanim, another consort of Abdülhamid II. On 27 April 1909, Abdul Hamid was deposed, and sent into exile in Thessaloniki. Sazkar was close to Abdul Hamid, and accompanied him for some time She returned to Istanbul in 1910 and settled with her daughter at her palace in Yeniköy. Later she settled in Şişli with Peyveste Hanım, her favourite among her husband’s consorts. Their rooms were on the same floor and every day they took coffee together and reminisced about the past. Peyveste's son Şehzade Abdürrahim lived close by and he used to visit often. After Thessaloniki fell to Greece in 1912, Abdul Hamid also returned to Istanbul, and settled in the Beylerbeyi Palace, where he died in 1918.

== Widowhood and death ==
At the exile of the imperial family in March 1924, Sazkar went to Beirut, Lebanon with her daughter, although as a consort and not a blood member of the family she could have remained in Turkey. When her daughter died in 1938, she moved to Damascus, Syria, to be near her daughter's grave and where she died in 1945. She was buried in the city, next to her daughter in the cemetery of the Sulaymaniyya Takiyya, Damascus, Syria.

== Issue ==
Name	Birth	Death	Notes
Refia Sultan	15 June 1891	1938	married once, and had issue, two daughters

== See also ==
- Ikbal (title)
- Ottoman Imperial Harem
- List of consorts of the Ottoman sultans

== Sources ==
- Açba, Leyla (2004). Bir Çerkes prensesinin harem hatıraları. L & M. ISBN 978-9-756-49131-7.
- Brookes, Douglas Scott (2010). The Concubine, the Princess, and the Teacher: Voices from the Ottoman Harem. University of Texas Press. ISBN 978-0-292-78335-5.
- Osmanoğlu, Ayşe (2000). Babam Sultan Abdülhamid. Mona Kitap Yayinlari. ISBN 978-6-050-81202-2.
- Sakaoğlu, Necdet (2008). Bu Mülkün Kadın Sultanları: Vâlide Sultanlar, Hâtunlar, Hasekiler, Kandınefendiler, Sultanefendiler. Oğlak Yayıncılık. ISBN 978-6-051-71079-2.
- Uluçay, Mustafa Çağatay (2011). Padişahların kadınları ve kızları. Ankara: Ötüken. ISBN 978-9-754-37840-5.
