= Nazikeda Kadın =

Nazikeda Kadın may refer to:

- Nazikeda Kadın (wife of Abdul Hamid II)
- Nazikeda Kadın (wife of Mehmed VI)
