= Behice Hanım =

Consort of Ottoman Sultan Abdul Hamid II (1882–1969)

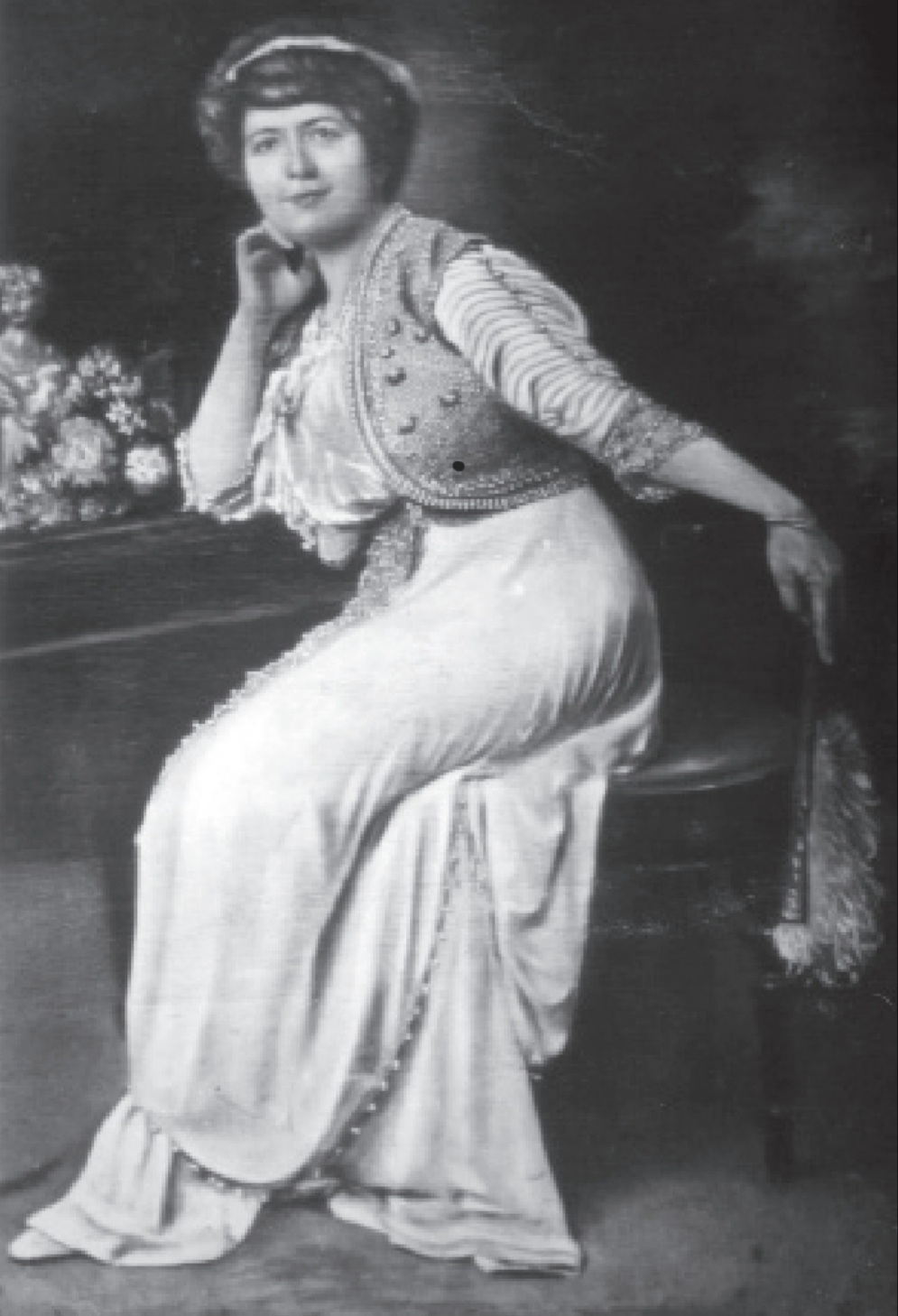
- Born: Behiye Maan; 10 October 1882; Adapazarı, Sakarya Province, Ottoman Empire (present day Turkey)
- Died: 22 October 1969 (aged 87); Istanbul, Turkey
- Burial: Yahya Efendi cemetery
- Spouse: Abdul Hamid II (m. 1900; died 1918)
- Issue: Şehzade Ahmed Nureddin; Şehzade Mehmed Bedreddin
Names
- Turkish: Behiye Behice Hanım; Ottoman Turkish: بھیجہ خانم
- House: Maan (by birth); Ottoman (by marriage)
- Father: Albus Bey Maan
- Mother: Nazli Hanım Kucba
- Religion: Sunni Islam

Behice Hanım (Ottoman Turkish: بھیجه خانم; "Happy"; born Behiye Maan; 10 October 1882 – 22 October 1969; after the Surname Law of 1934: Behice Maan) was a consort of Sultan Abdul Hamid II of the Ottoman Empire.

== Early life ==
Behice Hanım was born on 10 October 1882 in Beynevid, Adapazarı, Sakarya Province. Born as Behiye Maan, she was a member of Abkhazian noble family, Maan. Her father was Albus Bey Maan, the grandson of Kats Bey Maan. Her mother was Nazli Hanım Kucba, an Abkhazian, daughter of Hacı Kuç Pasha. She had one brother, Rauf Bey, and four sisters, Atiye Hanım, Tasvire Hanım, Ihsan Hanım, and Nimet Hanım. She was the first cousin of Sazkar Hanım, one of other consort of Sultan Abdul Hamid II. She was also related to the wife of Halil Kut Pasha. She was beautiful, tall and blonde, with blue eyes. She was very proud and arrogant.

== Marriage ==
Behiye's father learned that Abdul Hamid was looking for a bride for his son, Şehzade Mehmed Burhaneddin, and hence, in 1899 brought her to the court, and presented her to the Sultan. However, Abdul Hamid was so taken by the beauty of the young girl that he asked her hand in marriage for himself. Her father gave permission even though Behiye was against it. The marriage took place on 10 May 1900 in the Hünkar Kiosk of the Yıldız Palace. Behice was eighteen, while Abdul Hamid was fifty-eight. She was given the title of "Fifth Ikbal" and the name Behice.

A year after the marriage, on 22 June 1901, she gave birth to twins, Şehzade Ahmed Nureddin and Şehzade Mehmed Badreddin. Badreddin died at the age of two on 13 October 1903 because of meningitis.

On 27 April 1909, Abdul Hamid was deposed, and sent into exile in Thessaloniki. She didn't follow him, and instead remained in Istanbul. She settled with her son in Maslak Palace. After Thessaloniki fell to Greece in 1912, Abdul Hamid returned to Istanbul, and settled in the Beylerbeyi Palace, where he died in 1918.

== Last years and death ==
In 1924, the imperial family was sent into exile. Behice went to Naples with her son, where they lived in Via Generale Orsini. Her son later moved to Paris, leaving her here, where he died in 1945. After her son's death, life for her became difficult. She fell on hard times in Naples because she had no money and what she was sent from Turkey was being embezzled by her servant. A relative who visited her in Italy in 1969 was appalled by the conditions she lived in: her hair was unkempt, her nails had grown extremely long and she had not washed herself in weeks. In March 1969, she was reported in Istanbul by her family, where she died seven months later, on 22 October 1969 at the age of eighty-seven. She was buried in Yahya Efendi Cemetery, Istanbul.

== Issue ==
Name	Birth	Death	Notes
Şehzade Ahmed Nureddin	22 June 1901	December 1944	married once, and had issue, a son
Şehzade Mehmed Bedreddin	22 June 1901	13 October 1903	born and died in Yıldız Palace, he died because meningitis and buried in Yahya Efendi Cemetery

== Ancestry ==
Ancestors of Behice Hanım

16. Baja Bey Maan
8. Katz Bey Maan
4. Ömer Bey Maan
2. Albus Bey Maan
1. Behice Hanım
6. Hacı Kuç Pasha
3. Nazli Hanım Kuçba

== See also ==
- Ikbal (title)
- Ottoman Imperial Harem
- List of consorts of the Ottoman sultans

== Sources ==
- Açba, Leyla (2004). Bir Çerkes prensesinin harem hatıraları. L & M. ISBN 978-9-756-49131-7.
- Brookes, Douglas Scott (2010). The Concubine, the Princess, and the Teacher: Voices from the Ottoman Harem. University of Texas Press. ISBN 978-0-292-78335-5.
- Ekinci, Ekrem Buğra (March 31, 2017). Sultan Abdülhamid'in Son Zevcesi. Timaş Tarih. ISBN 978-6-050-82503-9.
- Osmanoğlu, Ayşe (2000). Babam Sultan Abdülhamid. Mona Kitap Yayinlari. ISBN 978-6-050-81202-2.
- Sakaoğlu, Necdet (2008). Bu Mülkün Kadın Sultanları: Vâlide Sultanlar, Hâtunlar, Hasekiler, Kandınefendiler, Sultanefendiler. Oğlak Yayıncılık. ISBN 978-6-051-71079-2.
- Uluçay, M. Çağatay (2011). Padişahların kadınları ve kızları. Ötüken. ISBN 978-9-754-37840-5.
