= Peyveste Hanım =

Consort of Ottoman Sultan Abdul Hamid II

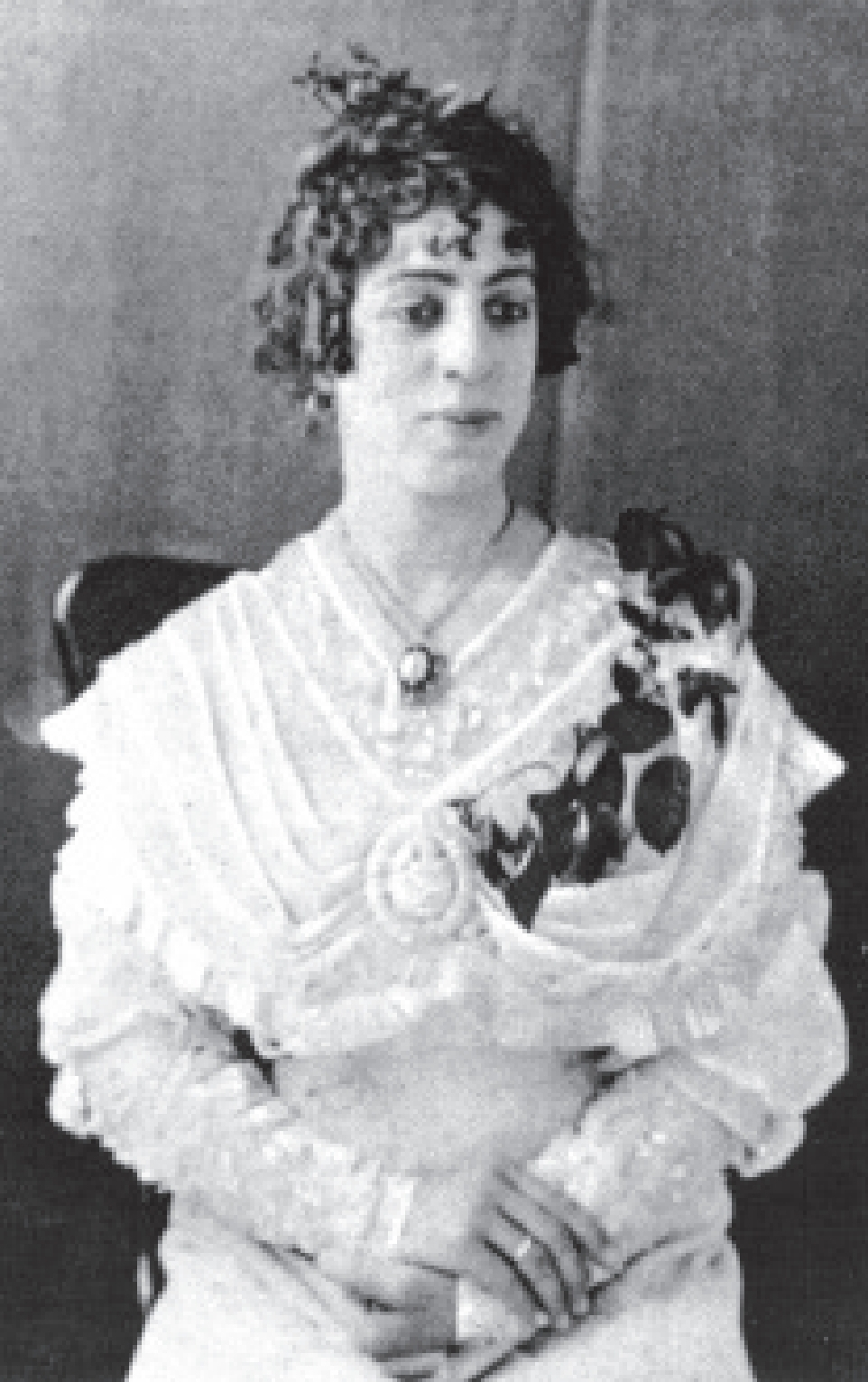
- Born: Rabia Emuhvari; 10 May 1873; Pitsunda, Georgia, Russian Empire
- Died: c. 1943 (aged 69–70); Mourad Boulevard, Paris, France
- Burial: Bobigny cemetery, Paris
- Spouse: Abdul Hamid II (m. 1893; died 1918)
- Issue: Şehzade Abdurrahim Hayri
Names
- Turkish: Peyveste Hanım; Ottoman Turkish: پیوسته خانم
- House: Emuhvari (by birth); Ottoman (by marriage)
- Father: Osman Emkhaa
- Mother: Hesna Çaabalurhva
- Religion: Sunni Islam

Peyveste Hanım (Ottoman Turkish: پیوسته خانم; "chatty"; born Princess Hatice Rabia Emuhvari; 10 May 1873 – c. 1943) was a consort of Sultan Abdul Hamid II of the Ottoman Empire.

== Early life ==
Peyveste Hanım was born on 10 May 1873 in Pitsunda, Abkhazia. Born as princess Hatice Rabia Hanim, she was a member of Abkhazian princely family Emuhvari. Her father was Prince Osman Bey Emuhvari, and her mother was Princess Hesna Hanım Çaabalurhva, also an Abkhazian. She had four elder siblings, Prince Hasan Bey, Prince Süleyman Bey, Princess Nurhayat Hanım, and Princess Emine Mahşeref Hanım (1871 – 1920). Peyveste was tall, with green eyes and auburn hair.

In 1877, Osman Bey volunteered for service in the Russo-Turkish War (1877–1878). He took his wife and children to Istanbul, and entrusted them to the care of Hesna Hanım's paternal cousin, Davud Bey. He returned to Abkhazia and was killed in the war.

Davud Pasha's wife Meryem Hanım, who had been in service in the palace, decided to present the widowed Hesna Hanım and her daughters to her paternal cousin Nazikeda Kadın, first wife of Sultan Abdul Hamid. Nazikeda accepted to take the girls at her service. Nazikeda renamed Hatice Rabia as Peyveste.

== Marriage ==
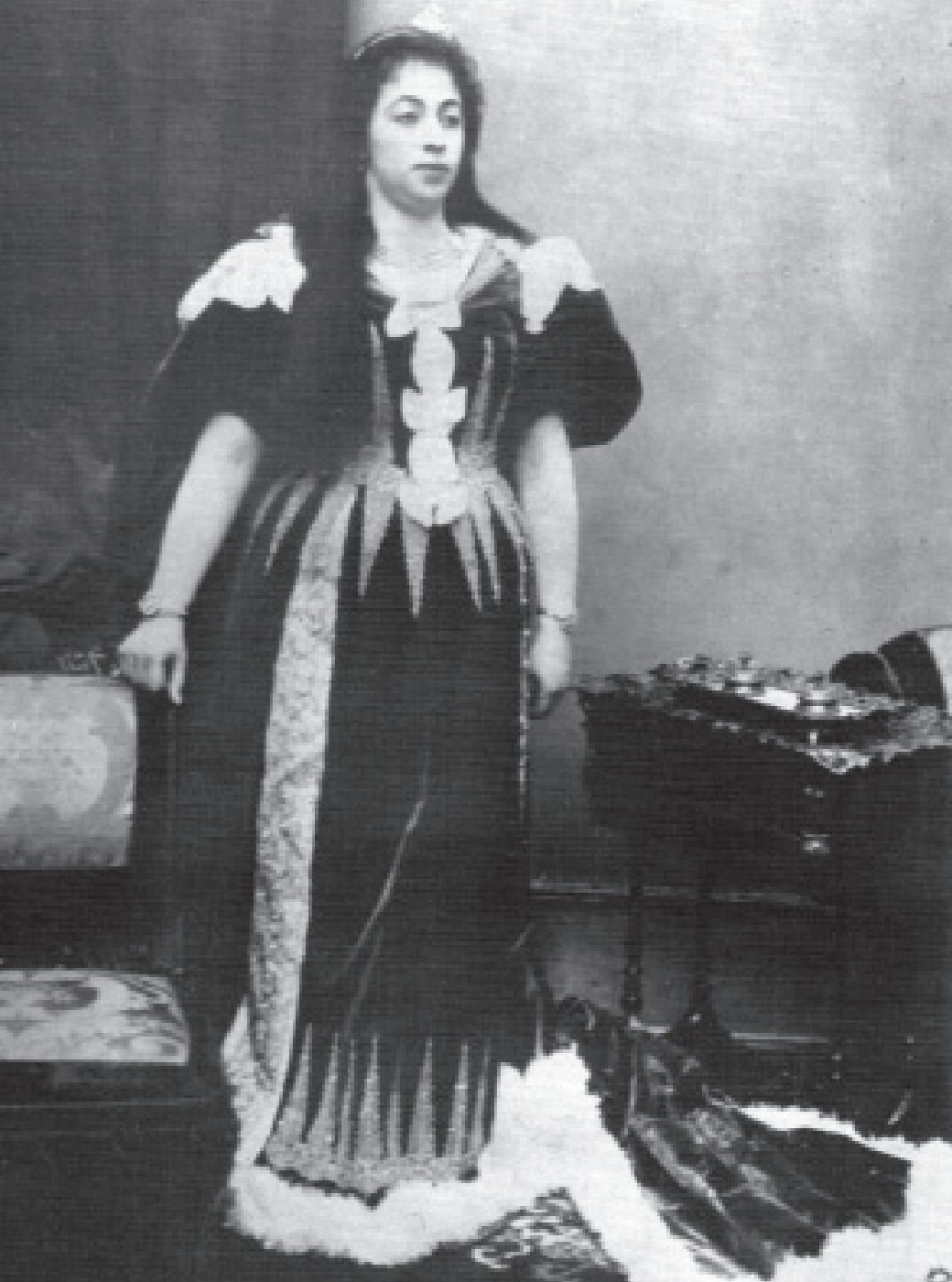

Peyveste met Abdul Hamid in 1890, and married him in 1893 in the Yıldız Palace. She was given the title of "Third Ikbal". On 14 August 1894, a year after the marriage, she gave birth to her only son, Şehzade Abdurrahim Hayri. Upon his birth, she was presented with a beautiful maison where she lived during Abdülhamid's reign. In 1897, Peyveste became pregnant with her second child, however, suffered a miscarriage. Abdul Hamid later allocated her in one of the Kiosks on the gardens of the Yıldız Palace. Peyveste was one of favorite consorts and Abdülhamid II respected and admirated her. He gave her the Hanedan-ı Ali Osman Order even though it was usually reserved to blood members of the Dynasty.

On 27 April 1909, Abdul Hamid was deposed, and sent into exile in Thessaloniki. She and her son accompanied him for some time, and returned to Istanbul in 1910, and bought a mansion in Büyükdere Avenue, Şişli. She settled with Sazkar Hanım, her favourite among other her husband's consort. Their rooms were on the same floor and every day they took coffee together and reminisced about the past. As Şehzade Abdürrahim lived close by, he used to visit often. After Thessaloniki fell to Greece in 1912, Abdul Hamid also returned to Istanbul, and settled in the Beylerbeyi Palace, where he died in 1918.

== Widowhood and death ==
After Abdul Hamid's death, she settled in the Sadaret Mansion located in Sultanahmet, Fatih. On 30 May 1918, Peyveste met with the Empress Zita of Bourbon-Parma in the harem of Yıldız Palace, when the latter visited Istanbul with her husband Emperor Charles I of Austria.

At the exile of the imperial family in March 1924, Peyveste accompanied her son to Paris. On 14 January 1925, she gave the power of attorney to Sami Günzberg, a well-known Turkish Jewish lawyer, authorising him to regain from usurpers buildings, lands, mines, concessions left by Abdul Hamid situated in Turkish territory and elsewhere.

She had sold her mansion in Şişli, and from the money she received, they lived a comfortable life in an apartment on Mourad Boulevard. She died in 1944, and was buried in Bobigny cemetery, Bobigny, Paris.

== Issue ==
Name	Birth	Death	Notes
Şehzade Abdurrahim Hayri	15 August 1894	1 January 1952	married twice, and had issue, one son and one daughter

== See also ==
- Ikbal (title)
- Ottoman Imperial Harem
- List of consorts of the Ottoman sultans

== Sources ==
- Açba, Leyla (2004). Bir Çerkes prensesinin harem hatıraları. L & M. ISBN 978-9-756-49131-7.
- Osmanoğlu, Ayşe (2000). Babam Sultan Abdülhamid. Mona Kitap Yayinlari. ISBN 978-6-050-81202-2.
- Brookes, Douglas Scott (2010). The Concubine, the Princess, and the Teacher: Voices from the Ottoman Harem. University of Texas Press. ISBN 978-0-292-78335-5.
- Sakaoğlu, Necdet (2008). Bu Mülkün Kadın Sultanları: Vâlide Sultanlar, Hâtunlar, Hasekiler, Kandınefendiler, Sultanefendiler. Oğlak Yayıncılık. ISBN 978-6-051-71079-2.
- Uluçay, M. Çağatay (2011). Padişahların kadınları ve kızları. Ötüken. ISBN 978-9-754-37840-5.
