= Nazikeda Kadın (consort of Abdul Hamid II) =

1st consort of Ottoman Sultan Abdul Hamid II (c.1848–1895)

Baş Kadın of the Ottoman Empire (Chief Consort)
- Tenure: 31 August 1876 - 11 April 1895
- Predecessor: Mevhibe Kadın
- Successor: Bedrifelek Kadın
- Born: Mediha Tsanba c. 1848; Abkhazia, Georgia, Caucasus Viceroyalty, Russian Empire
- Died: 11 April 1895 (aged 46–47); Yıldız Palace, Istanbul, Ottoman Empire (present day Istanbul, Turkey)
- Burial: Imperial ladies mausoleum, New Mosque, Istanbul
- Spouse: Abdul Hamid II (m. 1863)
- Issue: Ulviye Sultan
Names
- Turkish: Mediha Nazikeda Kadın; Ottoman Turkish: نازک ادا قادین
- House: Tsanba (by birth); Ottoman (by marriage)
- Father: Arzakan Bey Tsanba
- Mother: Esma Hanim Klıç
- Religion: Sunni Islam

Nazikeda Kadın (Turkish pronunciation: [nazik̟ʰeda kʰadɯn]; Ottoman Turkish: نازك ادا قادین; born Mediha Tsanba; c. 1848 – 11 April 1895; meaning 'One of delicate manners') was the first consort and chief consort (BaşKadin) of Sultan Abdul Hamid II of the Ottoman Empire.

== Early life ==
Born as Mediha Tsanba in 1848 in Abkhazia, Nazikeda Kadın was an Abkhazian princess. Her father was the prince Arzakan Bey, chief of the Tsanba family, and her mother was Esma Hanim of the Klıç family. She had a brother named Kazım Pasha.

She had been brought to Istanbul as a young child, where her father entrusted her to the household of the wife of Grand Vizier Mehmed Emin Âli Pasha. Here, according to Ottoman custom, her name was changed to Nazikeda. She then learned the court protocol, and to play the piano.

In 1858, aged ten, when Cemile Sultan, the daughter of Sultan Abdulmejid I, married Mahmud Celaleddin Pasha, the son of Fethi Ahmed Pasha, the groom's mother took Nazikeda, and presented her to Cemile. Pleased by the well-bred manners of Nazikeda, Cemile made her a personal attendant who always accompanied her mistress. She was a good pianist and was described as tall, with long straight black hair and dark eyes.

== Marriage ==
One day, Abdul Hamid visited his younger half-sister Cemile Sultan at her palace at Kandilli. Here he saw Nazikeda, and fell in love with her. He asked his sister to give him Nazikeda in marriage. In fact, Cemile also noticed that this young girl had pleased her brother, and she immediately presented her to him. The marriage took place in 1863 in the Dolmabahçe Palace. In 1868 she gave birth to her only daughter, Ulviye Sultan.

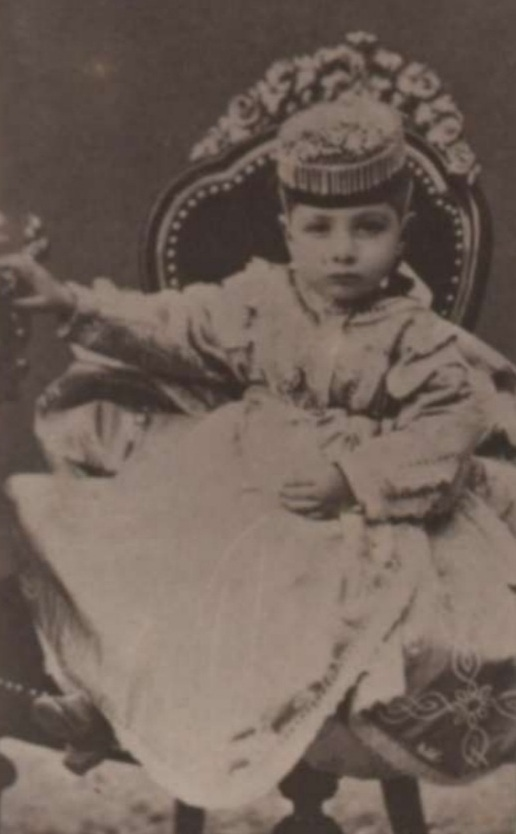
Nazikeda's daughter, Ulviye Sultan

On 5 October 1875, when Ulviye was seven, she was burned to death playing with matches, while Nazikeda, who tried to save her, also suffered severe burns. After her daughter died, Nazikeda fell into depression without ever recovering and ended up becoming obese and sickly. Her lady-in-waiting, Leyla Achba, wrote that every night Nazikeda fell asleep crying and calling her daughter. In his reflections, Abdul Hamid referred three times to the death of his first child. He considered it the first traumatic experience of his life curiously not mentioning the death of his mother when he was eleven or the death of his father when he was fourteen.

After Abdul Hamid's accession to the throne on 31 August 1876, she was installed the principal consort with the title of "Senior Kadın". According to Leyla Saz, she was in every way worthy of this position both with respect to her lofty spirit and because of her beauty. In 1877, Nazikeda and other members of the imperial family settled in the Yıldız Palace, after Abdul Hamid moved there on 7 April 1877. She held the second highest position in the imperial harem after Perestu Kadın.

Nazikeda, however, never forgot her first mistress, the wife of Mehmed Emin Âli Pasha. Deeply grateful to her for the training she received, Nazikeda obtained Abdul Hamid's permission to invite her to the palace. When according to the protocol the old lady bowed before her, Nazikeda persuaded her to sit beside her.

After the death of Peyveste Hanım's father, Nazikeda's paternal cousin Meryem Hanım presented her widowed mother Hesna Hanım and her sisters to Nazikeda. She won over Hesna, and adopted her daughters. Peyveste went on to marry Abdul Hamid in 1893, and became mother of the couple's only child, a son, Şehzade Abdurrahim Hayri, born in 1894.

== Death ==
Nazikeda Kadın died on 11 April 1895 in the Yıldız Palace, and was buried in the mausoleum of imperial ladies in Yeni Mosque in Istanbul.

== Issue ==
By Abdulhamid II, she had an only daughter:

- Ulviye Sultan (1868 - 5 October 1875). Abdülhamid's eldest child. Born in Dolmabahçe Palace, she died at the age of seven in an extremely tragic way: while her mother played the piano and their servants were dismissed for the meal, Ulviye Sultan began to play with some matches. Her dress caught fire and her gold belt trapped her inside it, even though her mother burned her hands trying to unhook it. In panic, Nazikeda picked up her daughter and ran down the stairs, screaming for help, but the movement fueled the flames and Ulviye Sultan was burnt alive, leaving her mother in total despair, from which she never recovered. She was buried in the Yeni Cami.

== See also ==
- Kadın (title)
- Ottoman Imperial Harem
- List of consorts of the Ottoman sultans

== Sources ==
- Açba, Leyla (2004). Bir Çerkes prensesinin harem hatıraları. L & M. ISBN 978-9-756-49131-7.
- Brookes, Douglas Scott (1 January 2010). The Concubine, the Princess, and the Teacher: Voices from the Ottoman Harem. University of Texas Press. ISBN 978-0-292-78335-5.
- Osmanoğlu, Ayşe (2000). Babam Sultan Abdülhamid. Mona Kitap Yayinlari. ISBN 978-6-050-81202-2.
- Sakaoğlu, Necdet (2008). Bu Mülkün Kadın Sultanları: Vâlide Sultanlar, Hâtunlar, Hasekiler, Kandınefendiler, Sultanefendiler. Oğlak Yayıncılık. ISBN 978-6-051-71079-2.
- Saz, Leylâ (1994). The Imperial Harem of the Sultans: Daily Life at the Çırağan Palace During the 19th Century : Memoirs of Leyla (Saz) Hanımefendi. Peva Publications. ISBN 978-975-7239-00-0.
- Tugay, Emine Foat (1963). Three Centuries: Family Chronicles of Turkey and Egypt. Oxford University Press.
- Uluçay, Mustafa Çağatay (2011). Padişahların kadınları ve kızları. Ankara: Ötüken. ISBN 978-9-754-37840-5.
