= Mahitab Kadın =

Consort of Ottoman Sultan Abdulmejid I (died c.1888)

- Born: 1830; Chechnya
- Died: c. 1888; Feriye Palace, Istanbul, Ottoman Empire (present day Istanbul, Turkey)
- Burial: Imperial ladies Mausoleum, New Mosque, Istanbul
- Spouse: Abdulmejid I (m. 1845; died 1861)
- Issue: Sabiha Sultan; Şehzade Ahmed Nureddin
Names
- Turkish: Mahitab Kadın; Ottoman Turkish: مهتاب قادین
- House: Ottoman (by marriage)
- Religion: Sunni Islam

Mahitab Kadın (Ottoman Turkish: مهتاب قادین; 1830 – c. 1888; meaning "moonlight"), also called Mehtab Kadın, was a consort of Sultan Abdulmejid I of the Ottoman Empire.

== Life ==
Mahitab married Abdulmejid in 1845. She was given the title of "Second Ikbal". Three years later, on 15 April 1848, she gave birth to her first child, a daughter, Sabiha Sultan in the Old Çırağan Palace. The princess died a year later on 27 April 1849.

In 1850, she was elevated to the title of "Senior Ikbal". Two years later on 31 March 1852, she gave birth to her second child, a son, Şehzade Nureddin in the Old Çırağan Palace.

In early 1853, she was elevated to the title of "Fifth Kadın", an honorary rank because she was one of favorite Abdülmejid's consort. In 1858–59, she sponsored a mosque in Göynük.

After Abdulmejid's death on 25 June 1861, Mahitab settled in the Feriye Palace with 11-year-old Nureddin, who died in 1884 at the age of 32. She died in 1888 in the Feriye Palace, and was buried in the mausoleum of the imperial ladies in the New Mosque, Istanbul.

== Issue ==
| Name | Birth | Death | Notes |
|---|---|---|---|
| Sabiha Sultan | 15 April 1848 | 27 April 1849 | born in Çırağan Palace; buried in New Mosque |
| Şehzade Ahmed Nureddin | 31 March 1852 | 3 January 1884 | married once without issue |

== In literature ==
- Mahitab is a character in Hıfzı Topuz's historical novel Abdülmecit: İmparatorluk Çökerken Sarayda 22 Yıl: Roman (2009).

== See also ==
- Kadın (title)
- List of consorts of the Ottoman sultans
- Ottoman Imperial Harem

== Sources ==
- Uluçay, M. Çağatay (2011). Padişahların kadınları ve kızları. Ötüken. ISBN 978-9-754-37840-5.
- Sakaoğlu, Necdet (2008). Bu Mülkün Kadın Sultanları: Vâlide Sultanlar, Hâtunlar, Hasekiler, Kandınefendiler, Sultanefendiler. Oğlak Yayıncılık. ISBN 978-6-051-71079-2.
- Paşa, Ahmed Cevdet (1960). Tezâkir. [2]. 13 - 20, Volume 2. Türk Tarih Kurumu Basımevi.
