= Şehzade Ahmed Nureddin (son of Abdulmejid I) =

Ottoman prince (1852–1884)

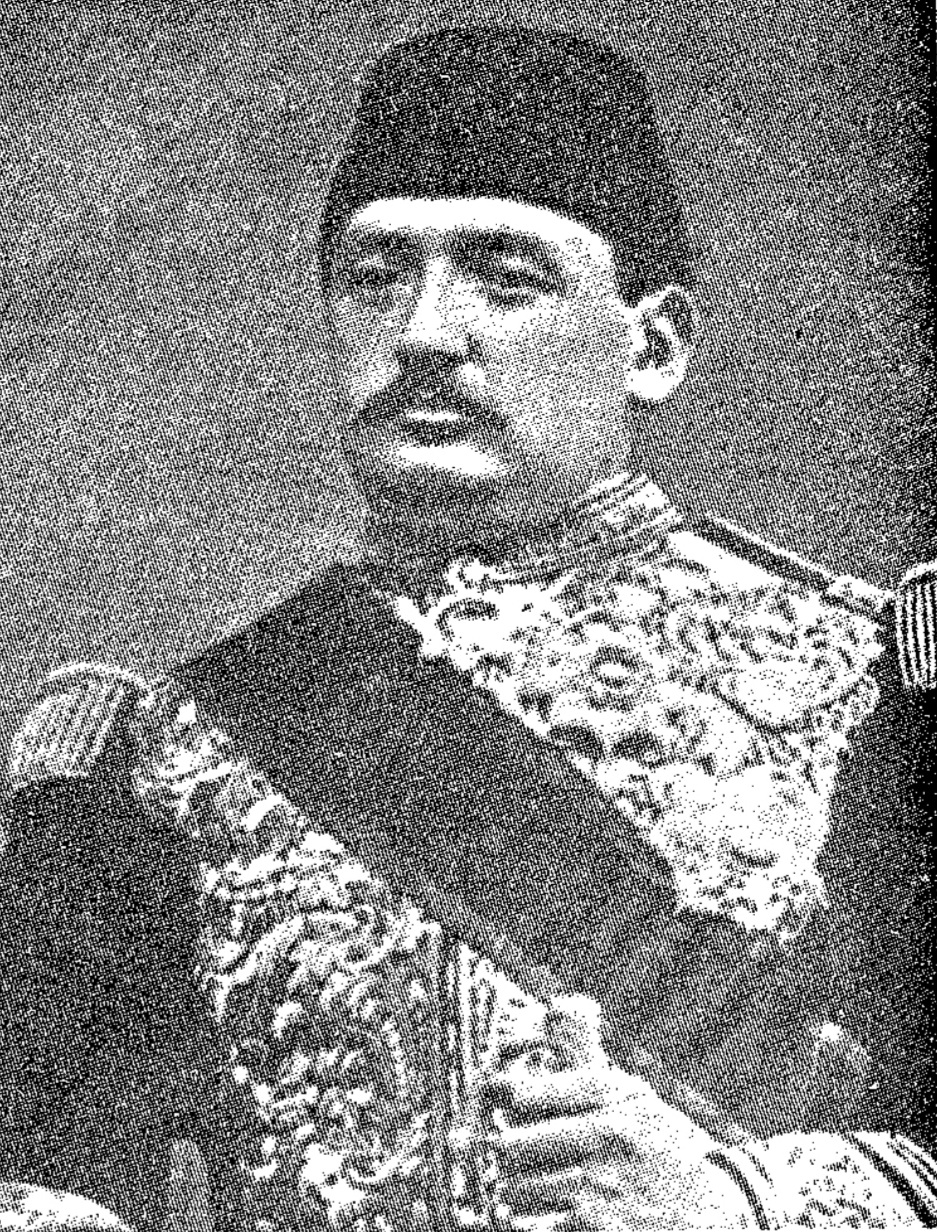
- Born: 31 March 1852; Old Çırağan Palace, Istanbul, Ottoman Empire
- Died: 3 January 1884 (aged 31); Istanbul, Ottoman Empire
- Burial: New Mosque, Istanbul
- Spouse: Nazlı Emsâl Hanım (m. 1870; died 1871)
Names
- Turkish: Şehzade Ahmed Nureddin; Ottoman Turkish: شهزادہ احمد نورالدین
- House: Ottoman
- Father: Abdulmejid I
- Mother: Mahitab Kadın
- Religion: Sunni Islam
- Military career
- Allegiance: Ottoman Empire
- Branch: Ottoman Army
- Rank: See list

Şehzade Ahmed Nureddin Efendi (Ottoman Turkish: شهزادہ احمد نورالدین; 31 March 1852 – 3 January 1884) was an Ottoman prince, the son of Sultan Abdulmejid I and his consort Mahitab Kadın.

== Early life ==
Şehzade Ahmed Nureddin was born on 31 March 1852 in the Old Çırağan Palace. His father was Sultan Abdulmejid I, son of Sultan Mahmud II and Bezmiâlem Sultan, and his mother was Mahitab Kadın.

Nureddin and his brothers, Princes Mehmed Reşad (future Sultan Mehmed V), and Ahmed Kemaleddin Mehmed Burhaneddin, were circumcised on 9 April 1857 in the Dolmabahçe Palace. After Abdulmejid's death in 1861, Nureddin and his mother settled in the Feriye Palace.

== Education and career ==
In February 1864, Nureddin was enrolled in the Ottoman Military College together with his cousin Şehzade Yusuf Izzeddin. Their tutor was Miralay Süleyman Bey. Another tutor was the future grand vizier Ahmed Mukhtar Pasha. After graduating from the military college on 19 January 1865, Nureddin served in the 5th Division of the 3rd Talia Battalion of the First Army. On 2 July 1866, he was given the rank of Senior Captain of the right wing. He, however, later left the army.

== Personal life ==
Nureddin's only wife was Nazlı Emsâl Hanım. She was born in 1852. They married in 1870. She died childless in 1870–1871, and was buried in Yahya Efendi Cemetery.

Nureddin like his brothers, Sultan Murad V and Şehzade Ahmed Kemaleddin joined Proodos ("Progress" in Greek) Masonic lodge in 1873. This lodge was founded in the Beyoğlu district of Istanbul in 1867, as an associate of the French lodge “Grand Orient.” The lodge's rituals were conducted in both Turkish and Greek.

== Death ==
Nureddin died of tuberculosis at the age of thirty-one on 3 January 1884, and was buried in New Mosque, Istanbul. His brother, Sultan Abdul Hamid II named one of his sons after him.

== Honours ==
=== Military appointments ===
Military ranks and army appointments

- 2 July 1866: Senior Captain, Ottoman Army

== Sources ==
- Ünlü, Hasan (2019). Veliahd Yusuf İzzeddin Efendi (1857-1916) (Thesis). Mimar Sinan Fine Art University Institute of Social Sciences.
