= Refia Sultan (daughter of Abdul Hamid II) =

Ottoman princess, daughter of Abdul Hamid II

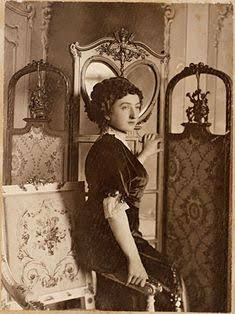
- Born: 15 June 1891; Yıldız Palace, Istanbul, Ottoman Empire
- Died: c. 1938 (aged 46–47); Beirut, Lebanon
- Burial: Cemetery of the Sulaymaniyya Takiyya, Damascus, Syria
- Spouse: Damat Ali Fuad Bey (m. 1910–1938)
- Issue: Rabia Hanımsultan; Ayşe Hamide Hanımsultan
- Dynasty: Ottoman
- Father: Abdul Hamid II
- Mother: Sazkar Hanım
- Religion: Sunni Islam

Refia Sultan (Ottoman Turkish: رفیعه سلطان; 15 June 1891 – c. 1938) was an Ottoman princess, the daughter of Sultan Abdul Hamid II and Sazkar Hanım.

== Early life ==
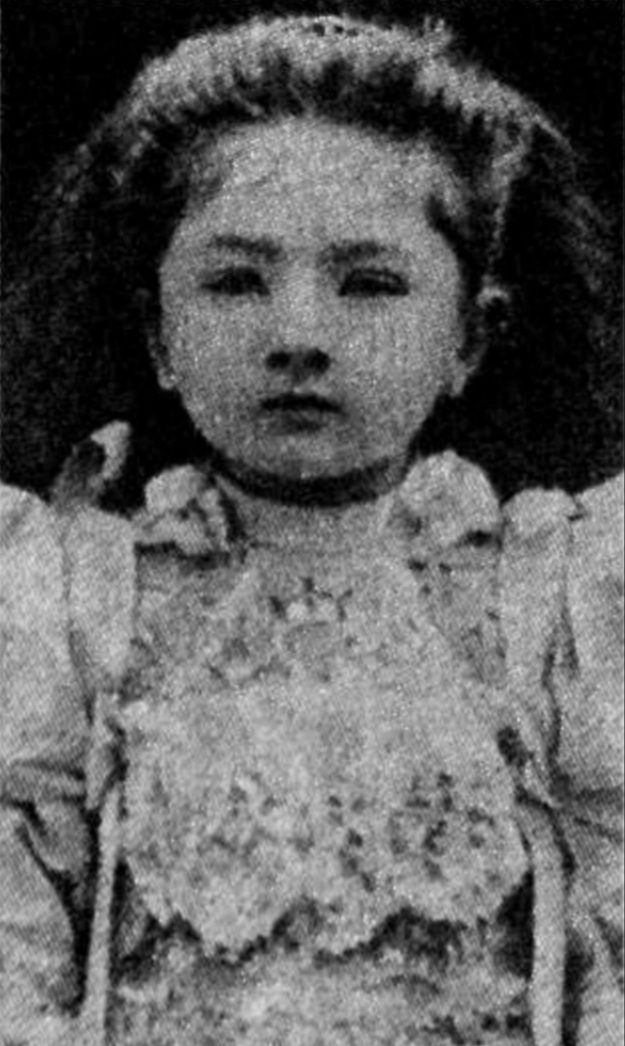
Refia Sultan as a child

Refia Sultan was born on 15 June 1891 in the Yıldız Palace. Her father was Abdul Hamid II, son of Abdulmejid I and Tirimüjgan Kadın. Her mother was Sazkar Hanım, daughter of Recep Bata Bey Maan and Rukiye Havva Hanım Mikanba.

She was the only child of her mother and her father's youngest daughter to reach adulthood. In her childhood, she learned how to play the piano from Lombardi Bey, a French music teacher who also taught other children of the sultan.

== Marriage ==
Towards the end of Abdul Hamid's reign, he bethrothed Refia Sultan to Ali Fuad Bey, the son of Müşir Ahmed Eyüp Pasha. However, at the overthrew of her father in 1909, the princess followed her parents into exile at Thessaloniki. The next year she returned to Istanbul.

The marriage took place on 3 June 1910 on Dolmabahçe Palace, the same day as the wedding of her half-sister Hamide Ayşe Sultan. He became a Damat. The couple had two daughters, Rabia Hanımsultan, born on 13 July 1911, and Ayşe Hamide Hanımsultan, born in 1912.

Upon the exile of the imperial family in March 1924, the couple and their daughters settled firstly in Nice, France. In Nice, she kept in contact with her half-sister Zekiye Sultan who was also living there in exile. In 1929, Hamide died at the age of seventeen, after being poisoned by gas-powered water heater in the bathroom. Hamide was engaged to Osman Zeki Bey, the son of Fatma Aliye Hanımsultan, daughter of Zekiye Sultan.

After Hamide's death, the couple and their remaining daughter Rabia settled in Beirut, Lebanon.

According to Neslişah Sultan, she was by far the worldliest among the daughters of Sultan Abdul Hamid II. She was a gracious lady, and her husband Fuad Bey was an excellent husband.

== Death ==
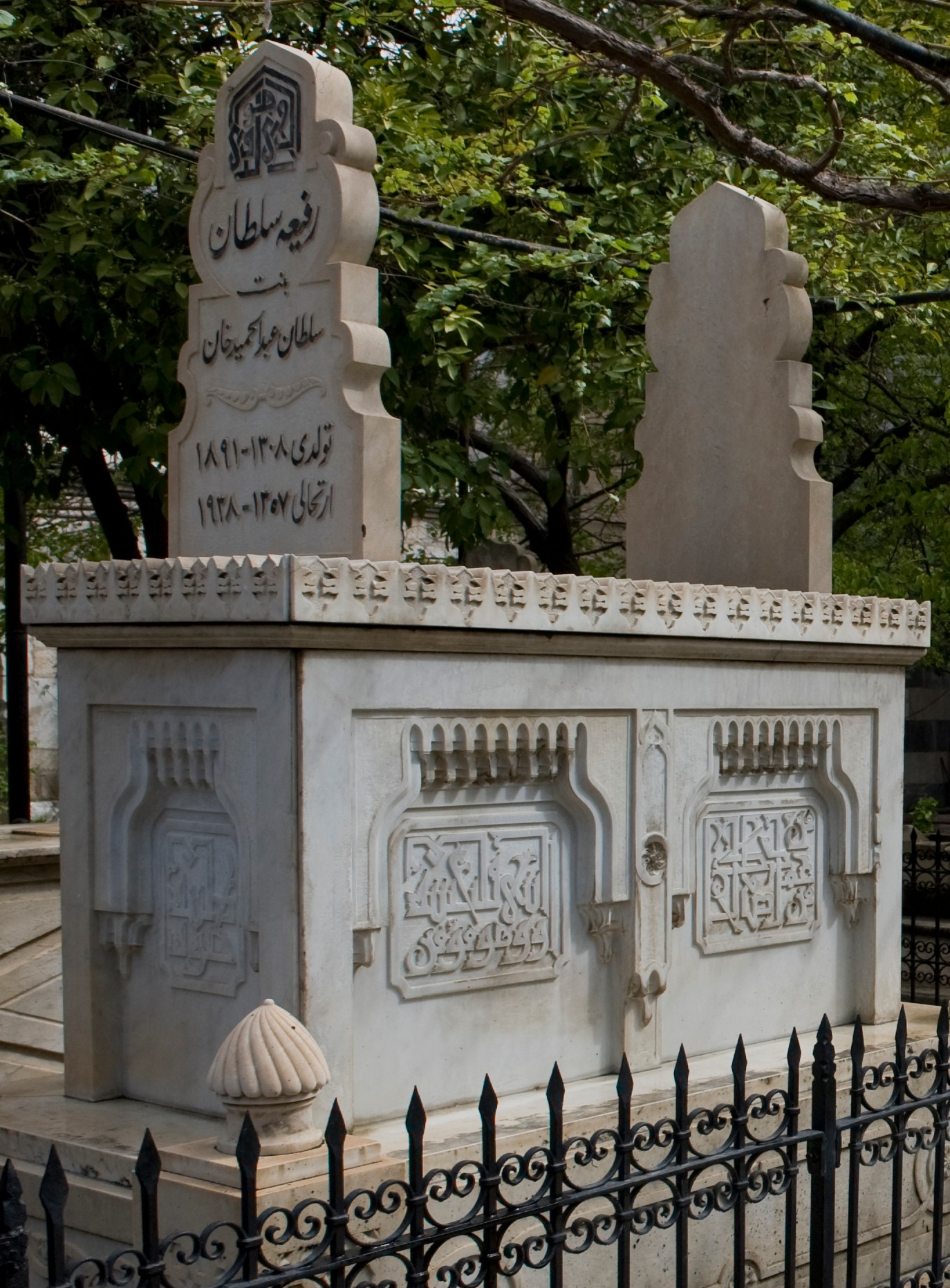
The grave of Refia Sultan

Refia Sultan died at the age of forty-seven in 1938 in Beirut, Lebanon, and was buried in the cemetery of the Sulaymaniyya Takiyya, Damascus, Syria. Her mother outlived her by seven years, dying in 1945.

== Honours ==
- Order of the House of Osman
- Order of the Medjidie, Jeweled
- Order of Charity, 1st Class
- Liakat Medal in Gold
- Iftikhar Sanayi Medal in Gold
- Hicaz Demiryolu Medal in Gold

== Issue ==
Name	Birth	Death	Notes
By Damat Ali Fuad Bey (married 3 September 1910; 1887 – 1953)
Rabia Hanımsultan	13 July 1911	19 June 1998	Born in Kiziltoprak Palace, Istanbul; Died unmarried, and was buried in the tomb of Mahmud II
Ayşe Hamide Hanımsultan	c. 1912	c. 1929	Born in Kiziltoprak Palace, Istanbul; Died unmarried in exile in Nice, France, because of an incident, and was buried in the cemetery of the Sulaymaniyya Takiyya, Damascus, Syria

== Sources ==
- Brookes, Douglas Scott (2010). The Concubine, the Princess, and the Teacher: Voices from the Ottoman Harem. University of Texas Press. ISBN 978-0-292-78335-5.
- Sakaoğlu, Necdet (2008). Bu mülkün kadın sultanları: Vâlide sultanlar, hâtunlar, hasekiler, kadınefendiler, sultanefendiler. Oğlak Yayıncılık. ISBN 978-9-753-29623-6.
- Uluçay, Mustafa Çağatay (2011). Padişahların kadınları ve kızları. Ankara: Ötüken. ISBN 978-9-754-37840-5.
