= Şehzade Abdurrahim Hayri =

Ottoman prince and son of Sultan Abdul Hamid II (1894–1952)

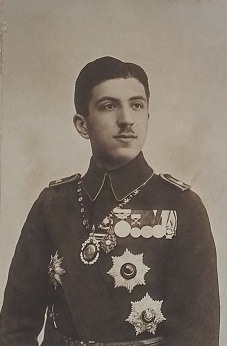
- Born: 15 August 1894; Yıldız Palace, Constantinople, Ottoman Empire (present day Istanbul, Turkey)
- Died: 1 January 1952 (aged 57); Hôtel Saint Honoré, Paris, France
- Burial: Bobigny cemetery, Paris
- Spouse: Nebile Emine Hanım (m. 1919; div. 1923) Feride Mihrişah Misalruh Hanım (m. 1923)
- Issue: Mihrişah Selçuk Sultan; Şehzade Mehmed Hairi
Names
- Turkish: Şehzade Abdurrahim Hayri; Ottoman Turkish: شهزاده عبد الرحيم خيرى
- Dynasty: Ottoman
- Father: Abdul Hamid II
- Mother: Peyveste Hanım
- Religion: Sunni Islam
- Military career
- Allegiance: Ottoman Empire; German Empire
- Branch: Ottoman Army; Imperial German Army
- Service years: 1914–1922 (active service)
- Rank: See list

Şehzade Abdurrahim Hayri Efendi (Ottoman Turkish: شهزاده عبدالرحيم خيرى ;15 August 1894 – 1 January 1952) was an Ottoman prince, son of Sultan Abdul Hamid II and Peyveste Hanım.

== Early life ==
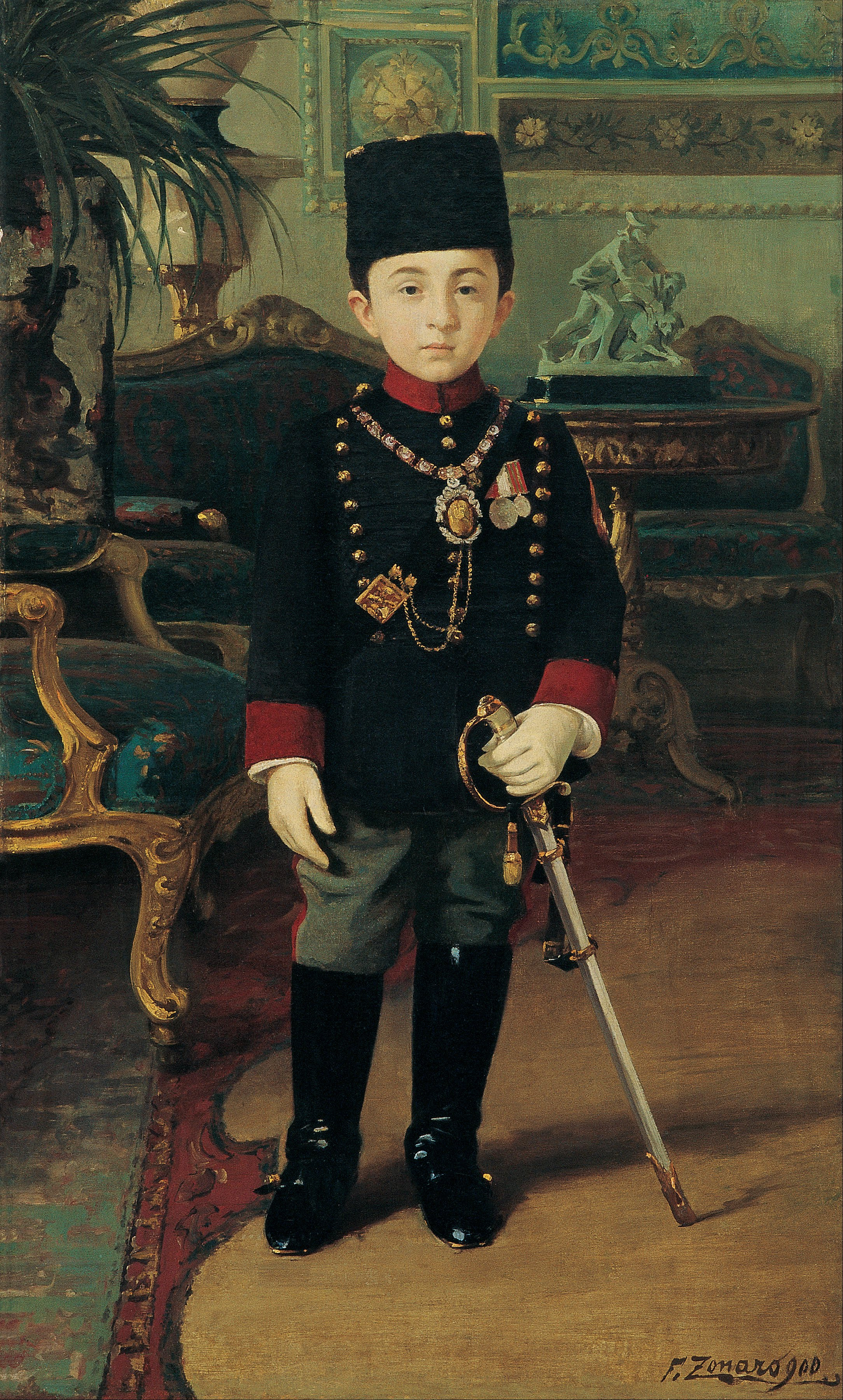
Young Prince Abdürrahim by Fausto Zonaro

Şehzade Abdurrahim Hayri was born on 15 August 1894 in the Yıldız Palace. His father was Sultan Abdul Hamid II, son of Abdulmejid I and Tirimüjgan Kadın, and his mother was Peyveste Hanım, daughter of Osman Bey Eymhaa and Hesna Çaabalurhva. He was the only child of his mother. In 1899, he was circumcised together with Şehzade Mehmed Cemaleddin, son of Şehzade Mehmed Şevket and Şehzade Mehmed Abdülhalim, son of Şehzade Selim Süleyman.

At the overthrow of his father in 1909, the fifteen-year-old prince and his mother followed Abdul Hamid into exile at Thessaloniki. In 1910, the prince and his mother returned to Istanbul. After Thessaloniki fell to Greece in 1912, Abdul Hamid also returned to Istanbul, and settled in the Beylerbeyi Palace, where he died in 1918.

== Education and career ==
After receiving education from the Palace School, Abdurrahim was enrolled in the Imperial School of Military Engineering in 1908. He was then enrolled in the Ottoman Military College in 1910, where he graduated in 1912.

Abdurrahim, along with other princes, Şehzade Mehmed Abdülhalim, son of Şehzade Selim Süleyman, and Şehzade Osman Fuad, son of Şehzade Mehmed Selaheddin, was sent to the Potsdam Military Academy as the guests of Kaiser Wilhelm II, where Şehzade Ömer Faruk, a son of Abdulmejid II, later joined them. The Kaiser had admitted these four princes into the Imperial Guard of Hussars, the personal guard regiment of the Kaiser. Abdurrahim graduated from the Potsdam Military Academy, and served as an artillery officer, between the years 1914–1916, at the court of Kaiser Wilhelm.

On 4 January 1917, Abdurrahim along with Osman Fuad visited the troops for morale-boosting purposes. The two young princes visited the 15th Army Corps, sent to Galicia to fight alongside the Austrian troops against the Russians. On 1 April 1917, he was appointed as the commander of the 17th Army Corps.

He saw active service with the Ottoman army during the First World War. He saw action in battles on both the Galician and Palestinian Fronts. His success on the Galician Front saw his promotion, before he was sent to Palestine, where his leadership saved artillery troops under his command from a British assault. As a result, he was awarded the German Order of Merit, the only member of the Ottoman dynasty to earn this order in service.

On 28 August 1918, while serving as the head of the delegation, he visited Germany, Austria and Bulgaria. The purpose of the delegation was to convey the message of the enthronement of Sultan Mehmed VI. On 19 October 1918, he was appointed to the headquarters of the general operations branch. On 8 February 1922, he was appointed as the artillery transport inspector. In 1922 he was considered for the role of the Caliph. He got received votes in the Grand National Assembly of Turkey, but his cousin Abdülmecid II was eventually elected. On 2 August 1922, he became the president of the World Competitions Preparation Society.

== Personal life ==
=== Engagement to Naciye Sultan ===
In 1908, when Abdurrahim came of age of marriage, his father decided he would marry Naciye Sultan, daughter of Şehzade Selim Süleyman. However, Naciye and her family were not told of this decision. When they learned of the decision, Naciye's parents opposed it, as Naciye was only twelve years old, at that time. However, her father couldn't oppose his brother, and was obliged to accept it, and so Naciye was engaged to Abdurrahim.

In 1909, after the engagement, Naciye Sultan's elder half-brother, Şehzade Mehmed Abdülhalim received a letter, which said that Abdülhalim will be killed if the engagement is not broken off. Abdülhalim's mother, İkbal Hanım, informed Sultan Mehmed V of this situation, after which the Sultan ordered the first secretary Halid Ziya Bey to carry out an investigation. It turned out that Abdülhalim himself wrote this letter as he opposed this engagement. After the incident, Sultan Mehmed broke of the engagement, and engaged Naciye to Enver Pasha.

=== Marriages ===
Abdurrahim's first wife was Nebile Emine Hanım, daughter of Egyptian prince Abbas Halim Pasha. She was born on 1 June 1899. They married on 4 June 1919 in the Nişantaşı Palace. She was mother of Mihrişah Selçuk Sultan born on 14 April 1920. Emine Hanım's sister, Kerime Hanım married Şehzade Osman Fuad, son of Şehzade Mehmed Selaheddin. The two divorced in 1923. She died on 6 February 1979, and was buried in Karacaahmet Cemetery.

Abdurrahim's second wife was his maternal first cousin, Feride Mihrişah Misalruh Hanım. She was born in 1901. They married on 2 September 1923, after Abdurrahim's divorce from Emine. In 1925, she gave birth to Şehzade Mehmed Hairi. After Abdurrahim's death in 1952, she and her son settled in Mantes-la-Jolie. She died in 1955, and was buried in Bobigny cemetery, Paris.

=== Personal interests ===
Abdurrahim was an artist and a musician. He received his musical education from Aranda Pasha and maestro-composer Edgar Manas, who performed the orchestration of Turkish national anthem. He played various instruments like piano, mandolin and cello. He used to paint landscapes by using charcoal and pastels. In 1900, he made the oil painting of Italian prince, Victor Emmanuel III of Italy when he visited Istanbul as heir to the throne. In 1910, he visited Istanbul secondly as a king, and presented Abdurrahim with a silver pen to express his gratitude by appreciating the gift of prince's oil painting.

== Life in exile and death ==
At the exile of imperial family in March 1924, Abdurrahim, his wife, mother, daughter and aunt first settled in Vienna. After living in Vienna, they went to Rome. At last, they settled in Paris, France. His mother had sold her mansion in Şişli, and from the money she received, they lived a comfortable life in an apartment on Mourad Boulevard.

In 1940, his only daughter, Mihrişah married Egyptian diplomat Ahmet Râtib Bey and went to live in Cairo. After his mother's death in 1944, the prince, had no money. He sold his house and settled in Hotel Saint-Honoré in Paris. His sister, Şadiye Sultan, came to live in the hotel, and took a room adjacent to his.

At length after suffering from depression and financial difficulties, Abdurrahim killed himself on 1 January 1952 at the age of fifty-seven by consuming excessive amount of morphine. He was buried in Bobigny cemetery.

== Honours ==
Ottoman honours

- Order of the House of Osman
- Order of Glory, Jeweled
- Order of Distinction, Jeweled
- Order of Osmanieh, Jeweled
- Order of Medjidie, Jeweled
- Imtiyaz Medal in Silver; in Gold
- Liakat Medal in Gold

Foreign honours

- German Empire: Order of Merit

=== Military appointments ===
Military ranks and appointments

- 1914 – 1916: Artillery Officer, Imperial German Army

== Issue ==
Şehzade Hayri had a daughter and a son:

- Mihrişah Selçuk Sultan (14 April 1920 - 11 May 1980) - with Nebile Emine Hanim. Born Istanbul, Nişantaşı Palace, died Montecarlo, buried Cairo. She married twice:
  - On 7 October 1940, Il Cairo, with Ahmed El-Djezouli Ratib (1912-1972). By him she had two daughters and a son:
    - Hatice Türkan Hanimsultan Ratib (b. 1941). She married twice, with Hussein Fahmy, by she had two daughters, Melek Fahmy (b. 1966) and Nesrine Fahmy (b. 1968), both married with issue, and with Yoursi Musa.
    - Mihrimah Hanimsultan Ratib (1943-1946).
    - Sultanzade Turan Ibrahim Ratib (b. 3 May 1950, Giza). He married Anne de Montozon de Leguilhac on 27 July 1974 a Bogotà and had a daughter, Fatma Nimet Selçuk Mahiveche Ratib (b. 11 July 1976, Rio de Janeiro) and a son, Karim Ratib (n. 13 July 1978, Bogotà).
  - On 7 April 1966, Paris, with Ismail Asim.
- Şehzade Mehmed Hairi (1925 - c. 1975) - with Feride Mihrişah Misalruh Hanım. Born in exile in Paris, he married a French woman by whom he had no children. He died of cancer in Paris.

== Sources ==
- Milanlıoğlu, Neval (2011). Emine Naciye Sultan'ın Hayatı (1896-1957) (Postgraguate Thesis) (in Turkish). Marmara University Institute of Social Sciences.
- Glencross, M.; Rowbotham, J. (2018). Monarchies and the Great War. Palgrave Studies in Modern Monarchy. Springer International Publishing. ISBN 978-3-319-89515-4.
