= Bobigny cemetery =

Muslim cemetery in France

Coordinates: 48.9006°N 2.4337°E

Bobigny cemetery is a Muslim-only burial ground near Paris in the town of Bobigny, Seine-Saint-Denis, France.

Lying just a few kilometers to the northeast of Paris, the town of Bobigny is home to one of only two Muslim cemeteries in France. It was created by the French government in 1937 on the site adjacent to the Franco-Muslim Hospital of Bobigny and hold about 7000 plots, for mainly North African people. It is a listed historical monument since 2006.

== Notable interments ==
- Boughera El Ouafi – French Olympic champion
- Peyveste Hanım – wife of Sultan of the Ottoman Empire
- Şehsuvar Hanım – wife of Caliphate of the Ottoman Empire
- Osman Fuad – Ottoman prince
- Akbar agha Sheykhulislamov – exile Azerbaijani politician and cabinet minister
- Princess Niloufer – Ottoman princess
- Abdul Halim Khaddam – Syrian statesman
- Mohamed Saïl – Algerian anarchist and anti-colonial activist

== Gallery ==
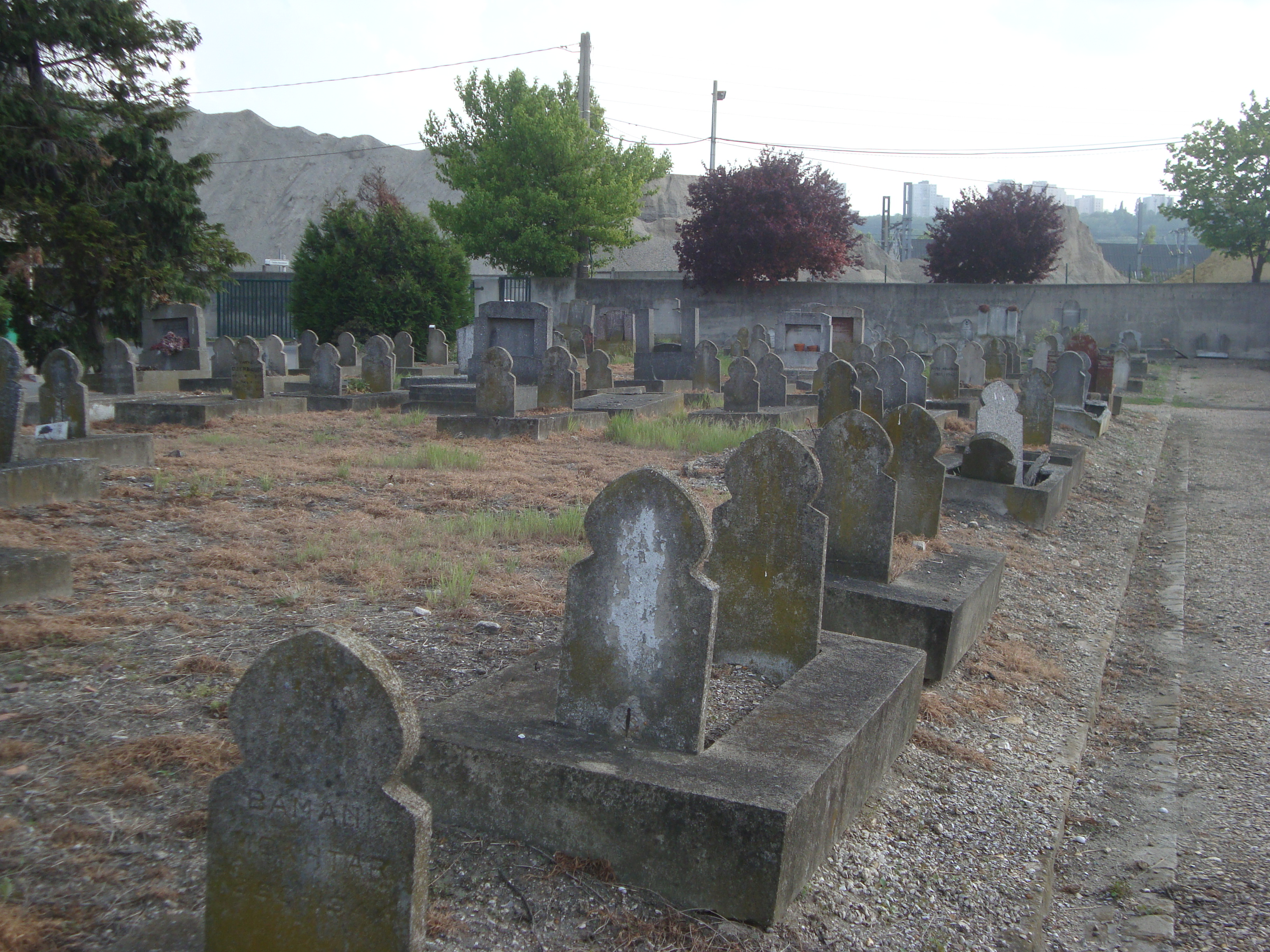

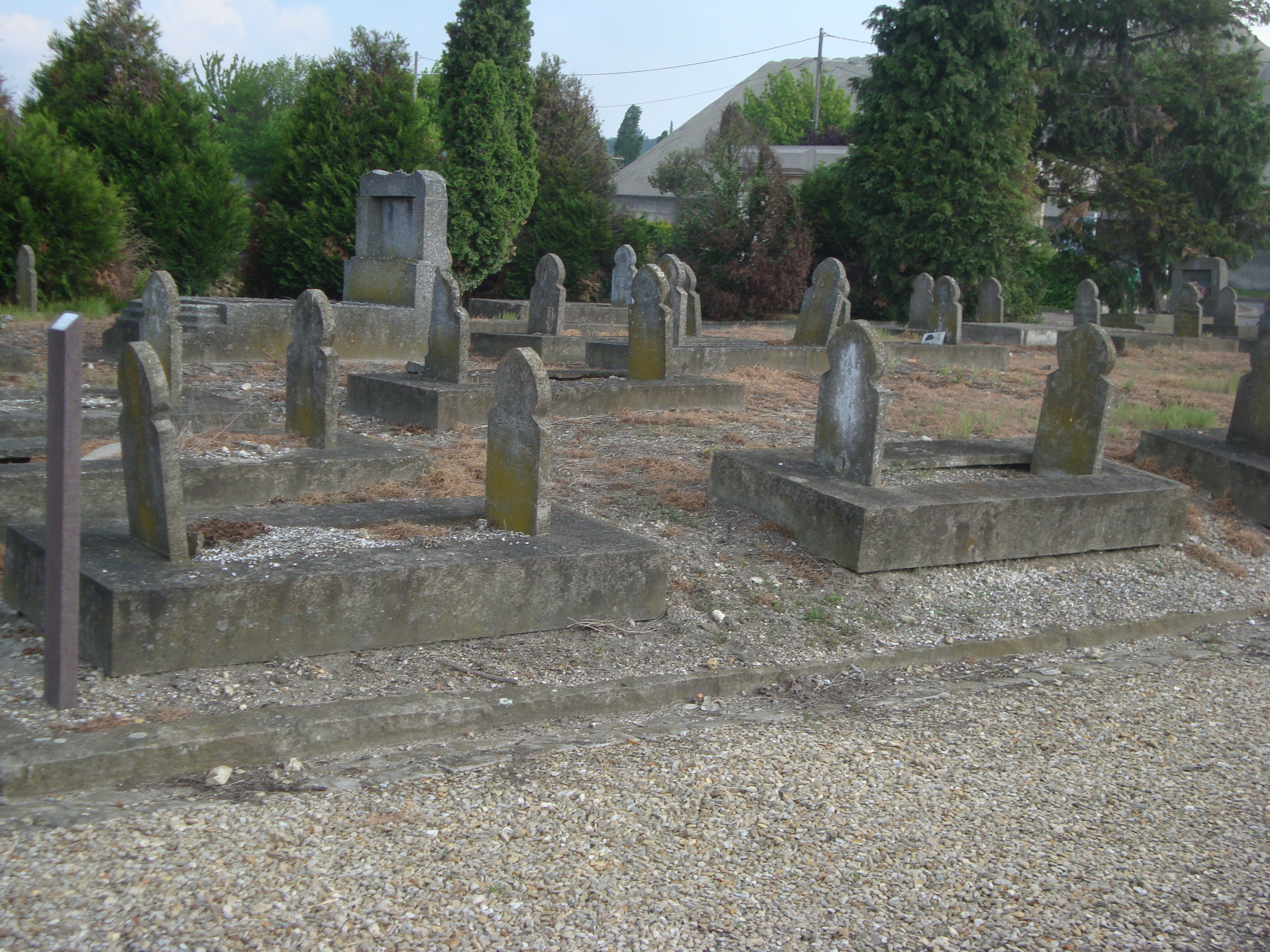

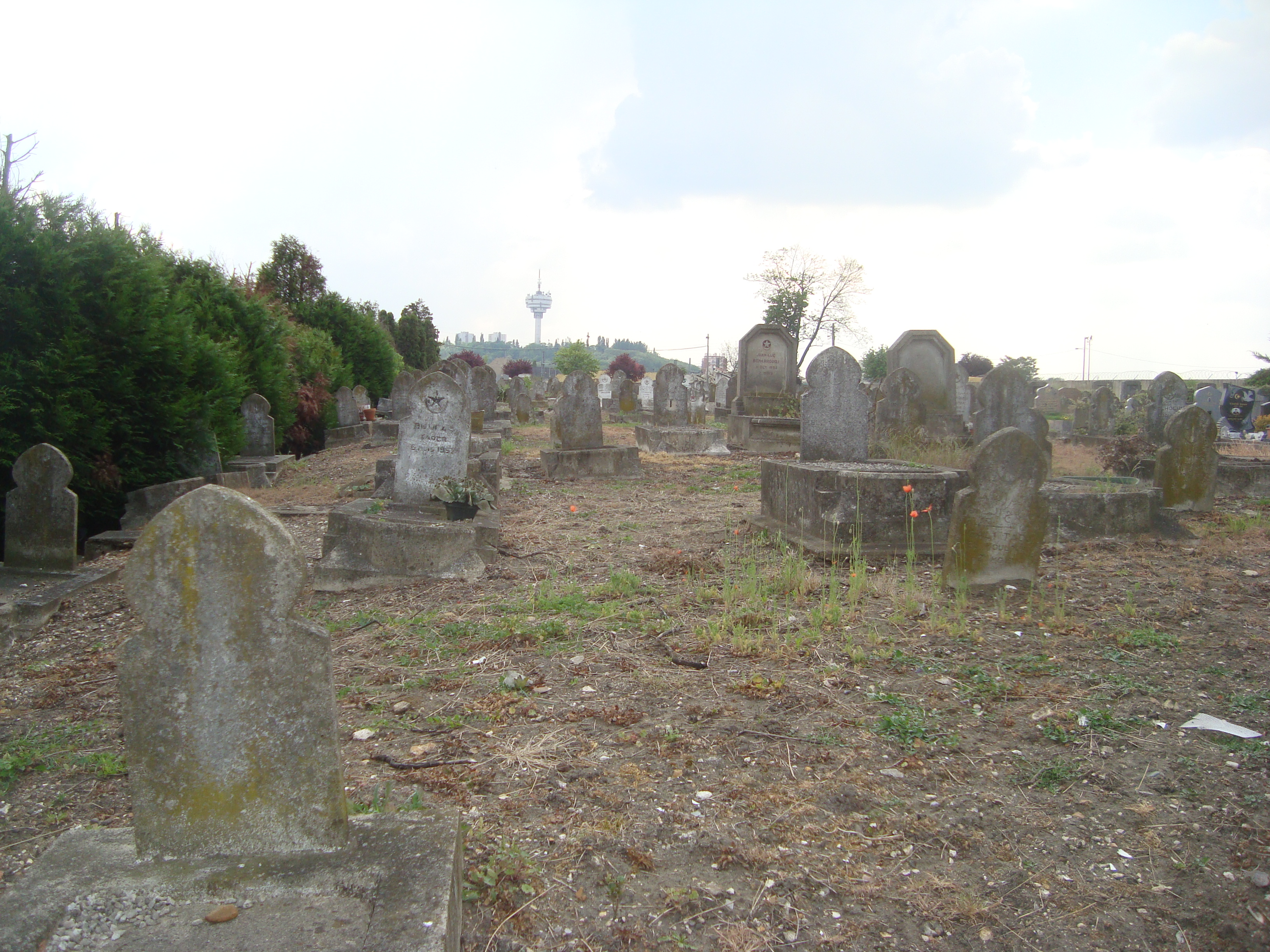

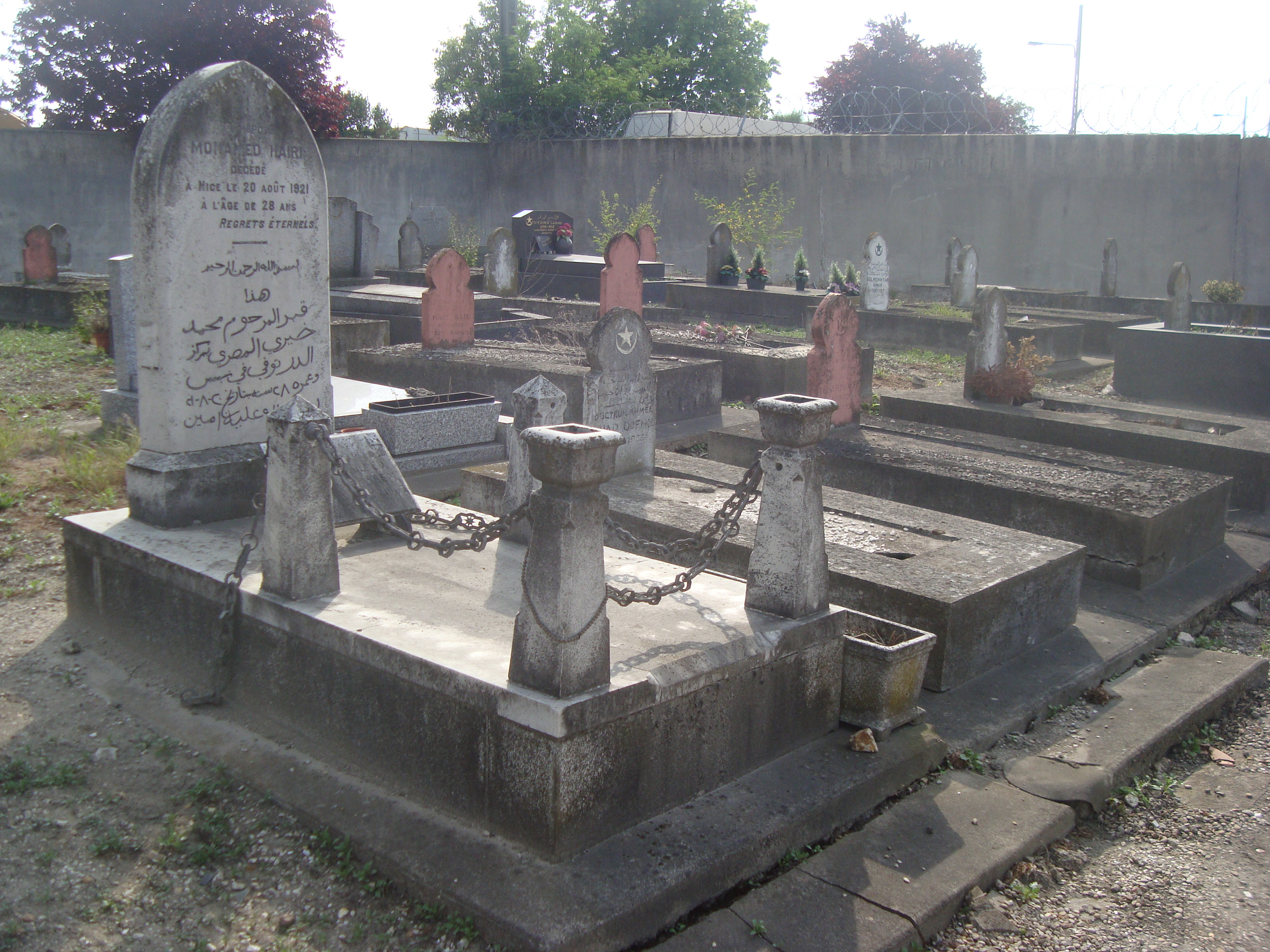
Hairi

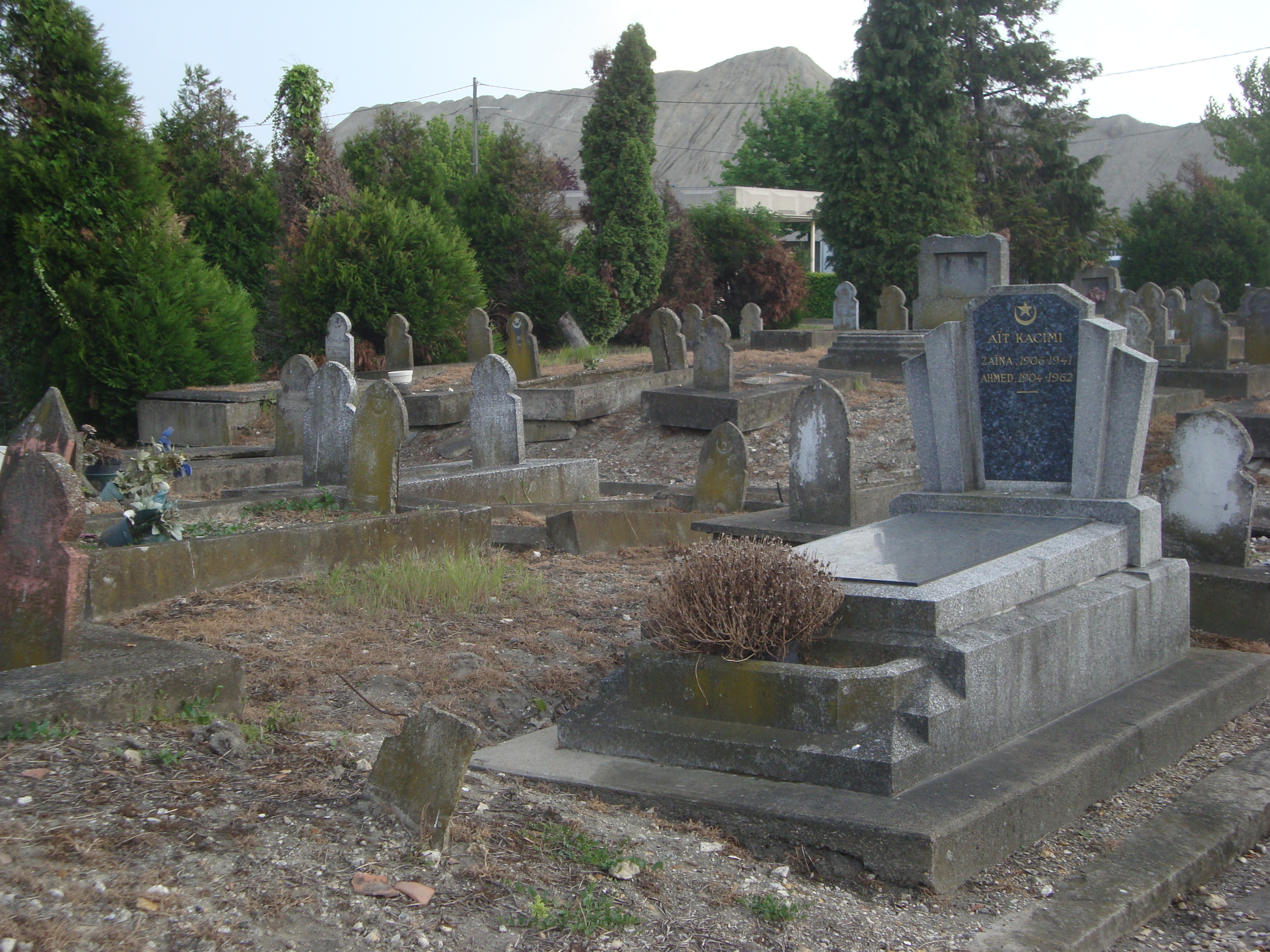
Kacimi-Tombe-Bobigny

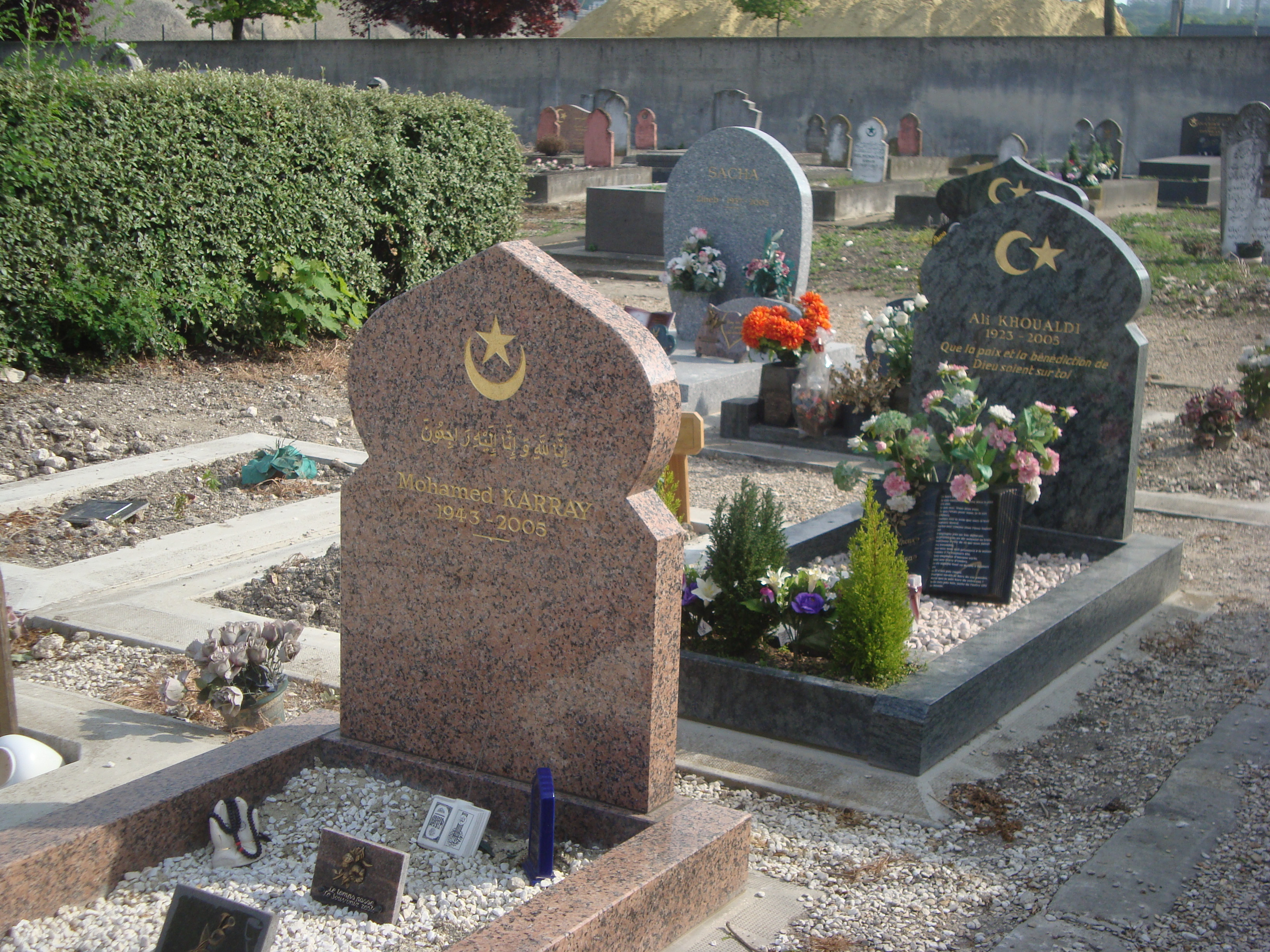
Karray

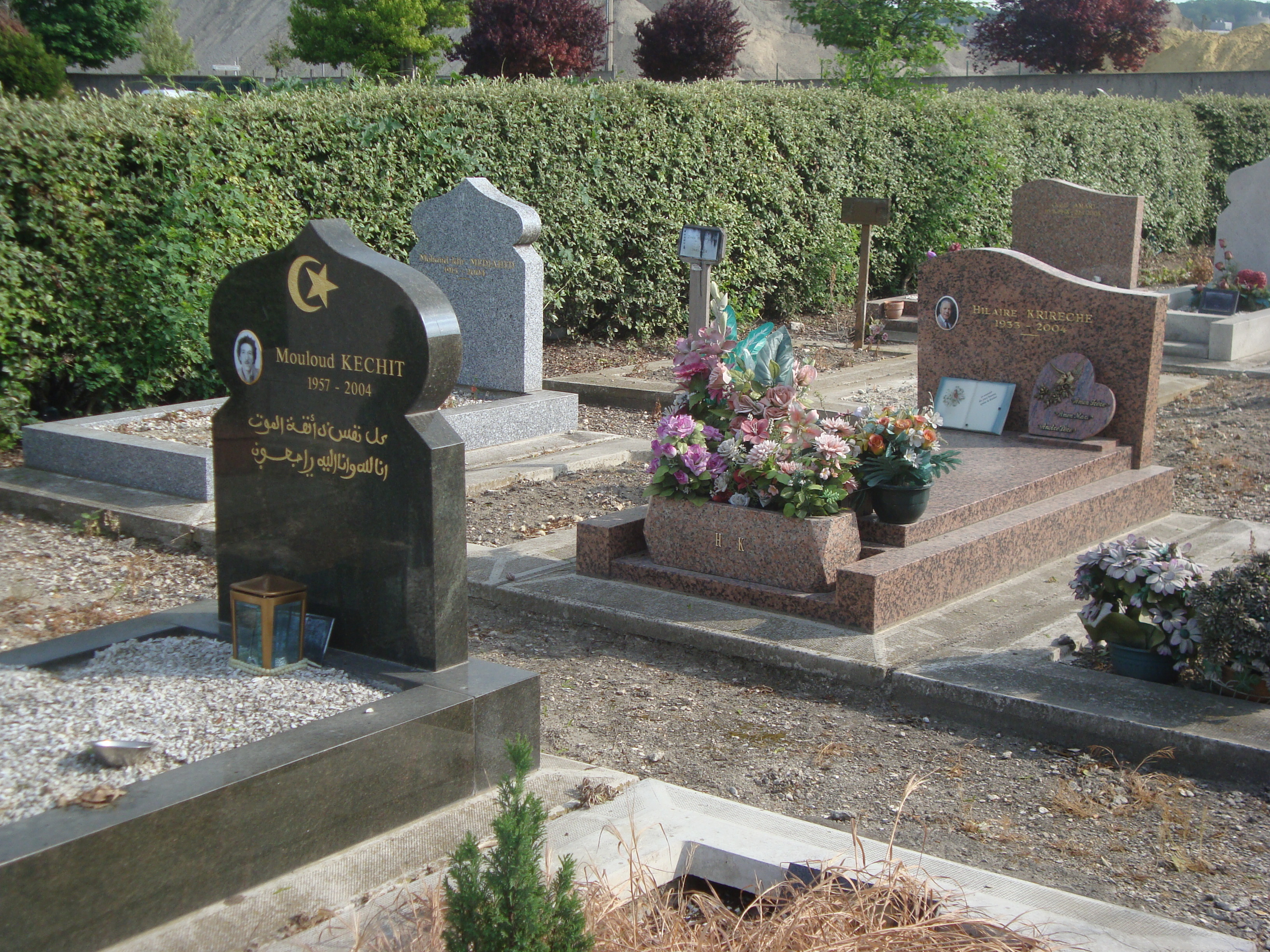
Kechit-tombe-Bobigny

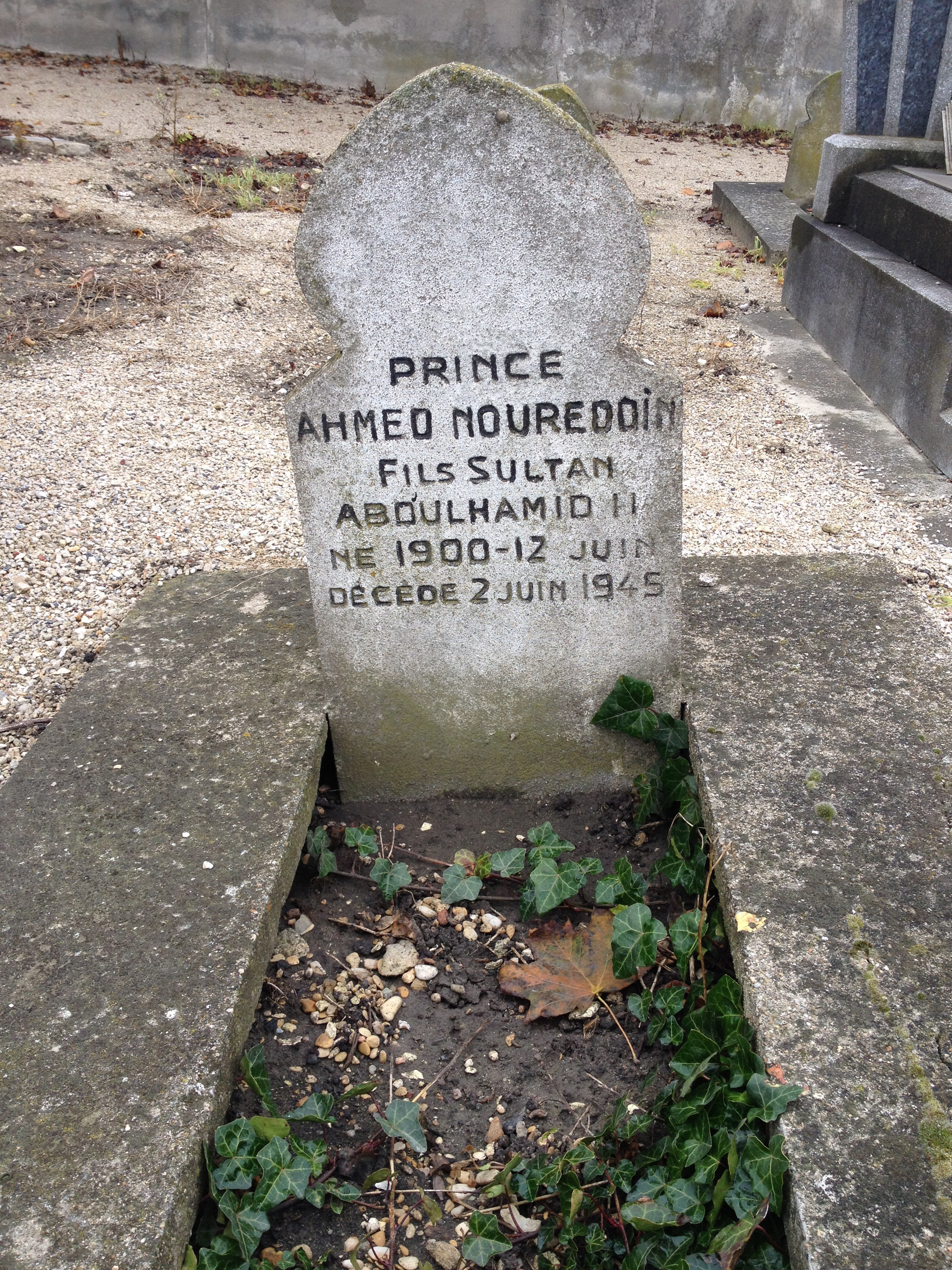
Ahmed Nureddin Efendi (1900–1945), son of the Ottoman sultan Abdul Hamid II

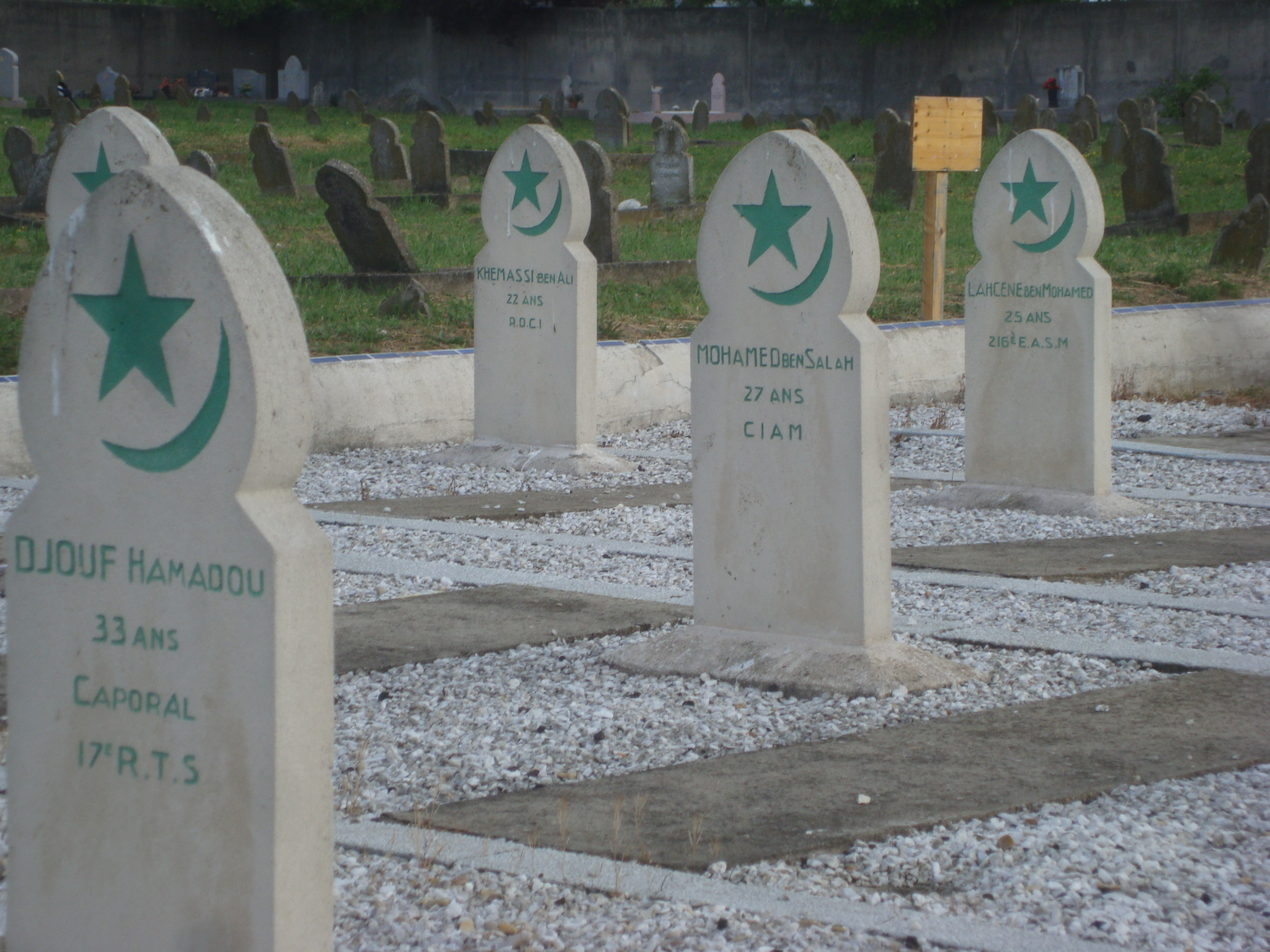
Ben Salah

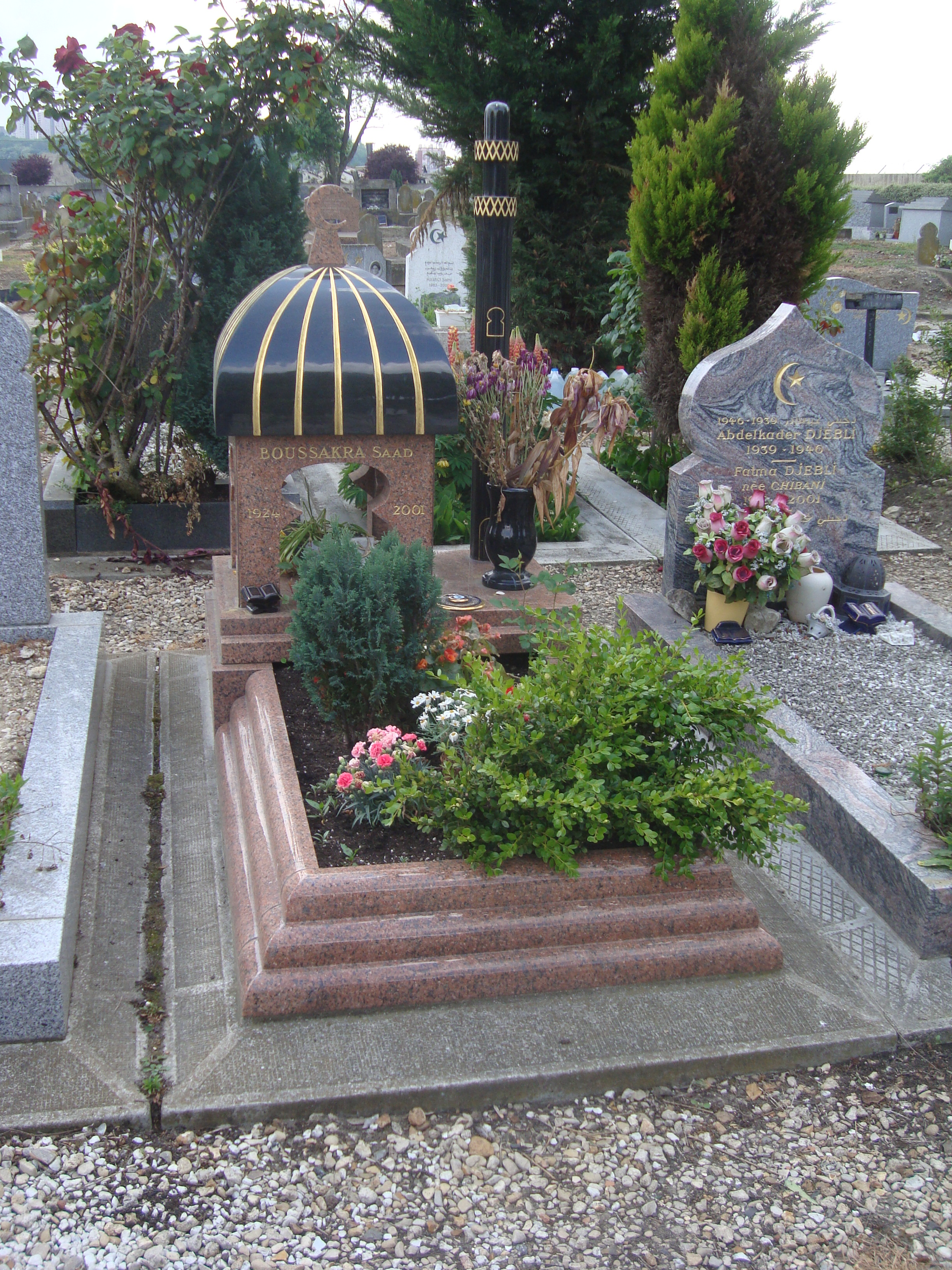
Boussakra

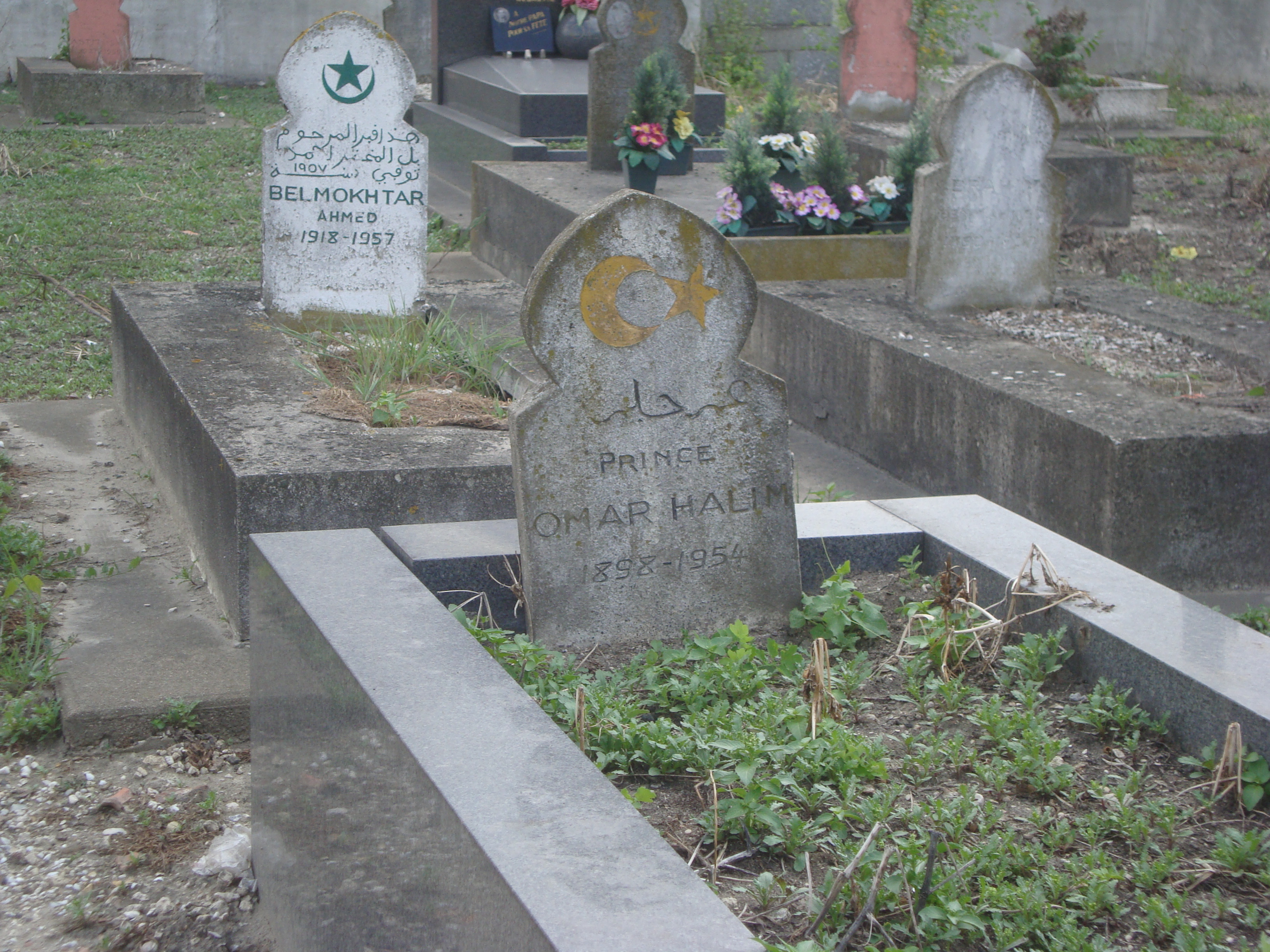
Prince Omar Halim-tomb

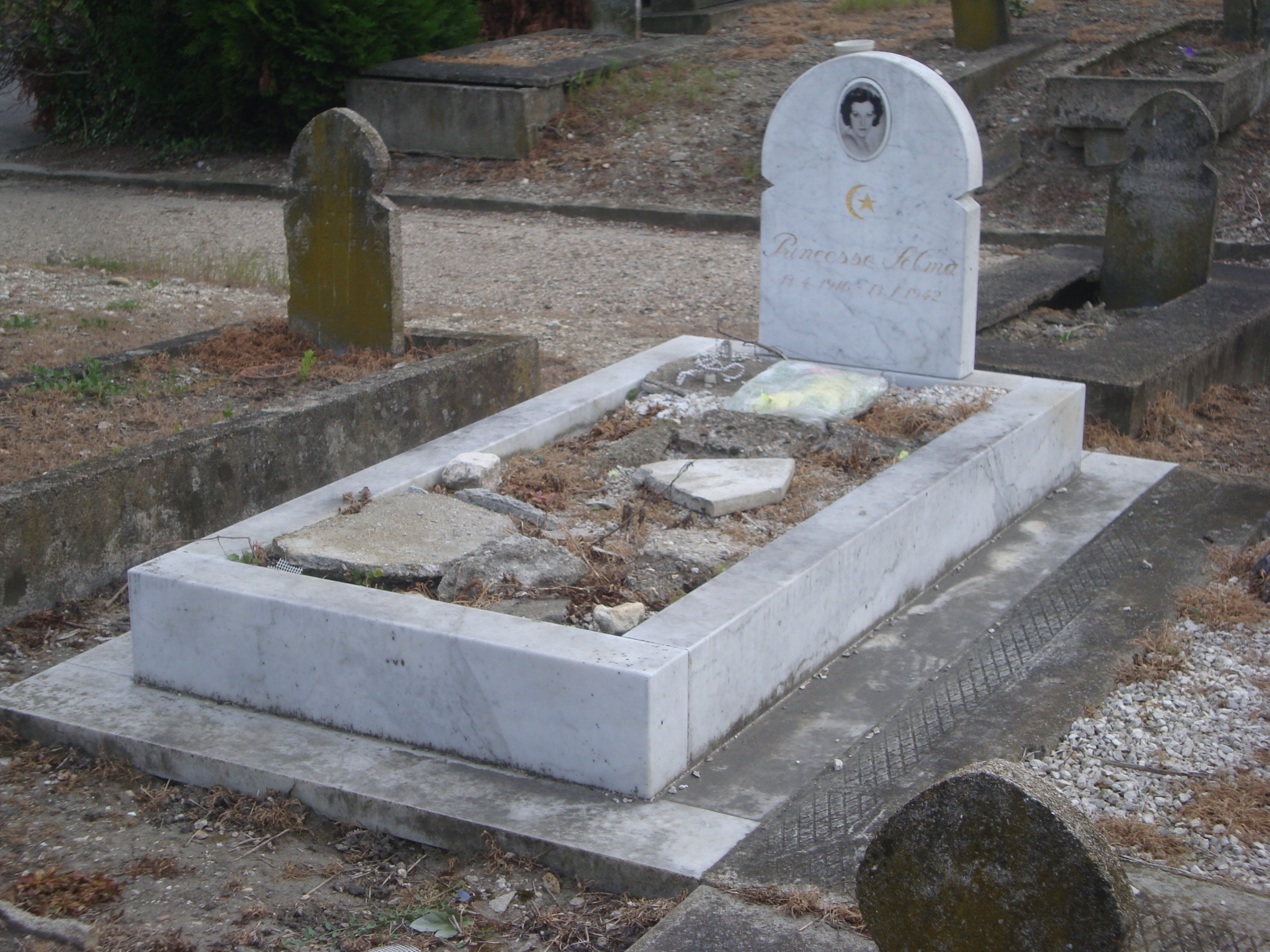
Princesse Selma-tombe

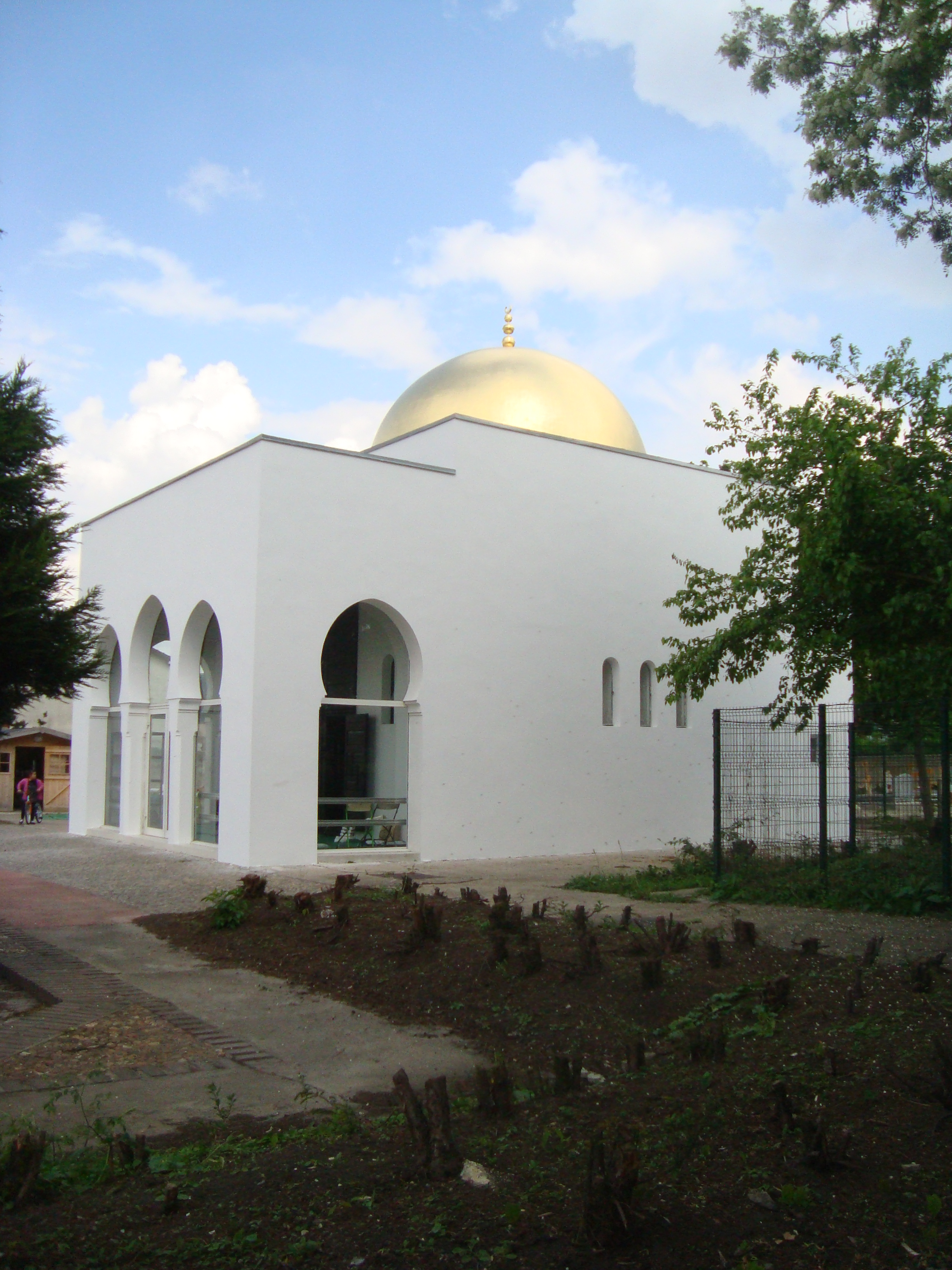
Salle de priere

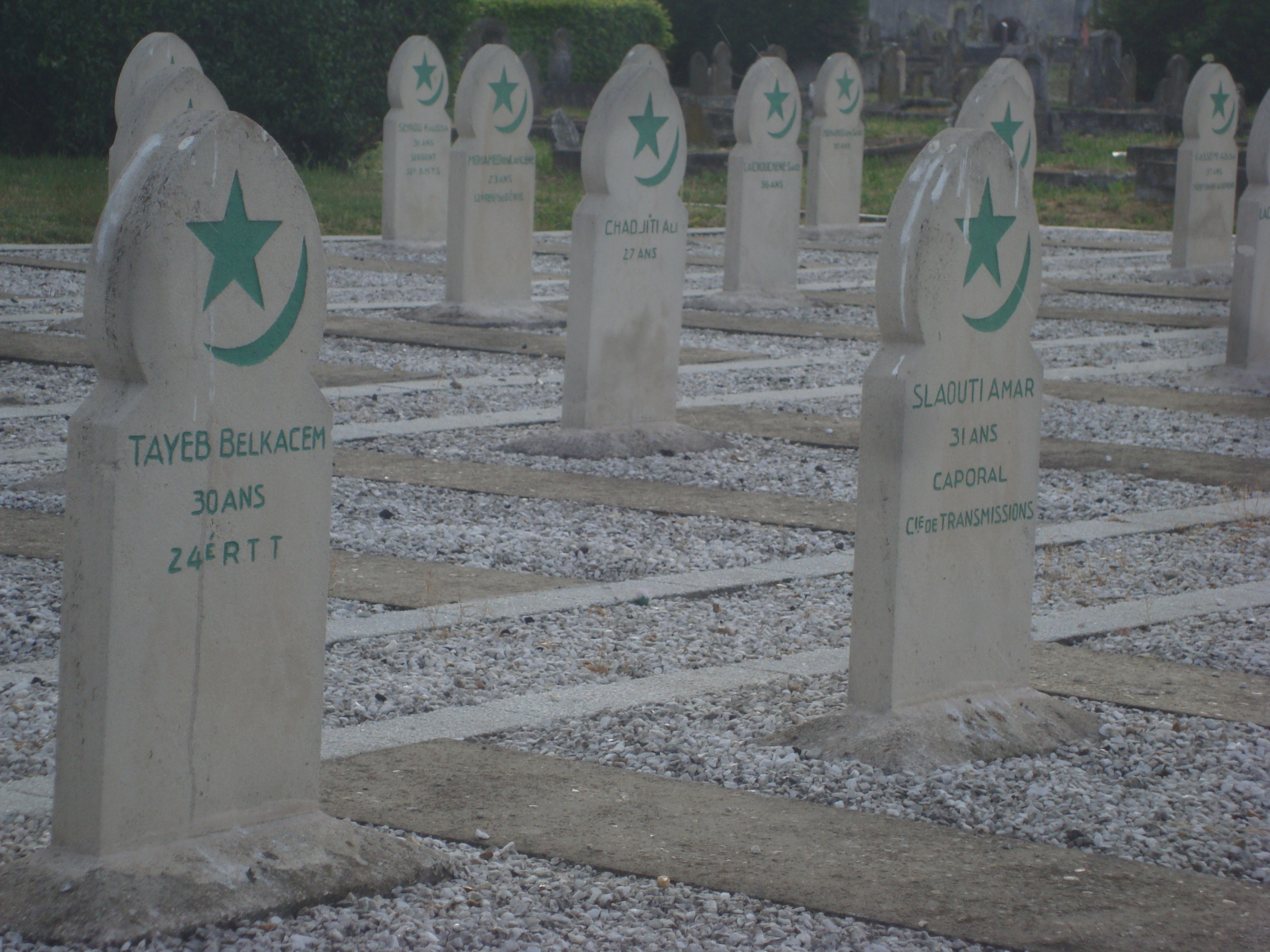
Slouati-tomb

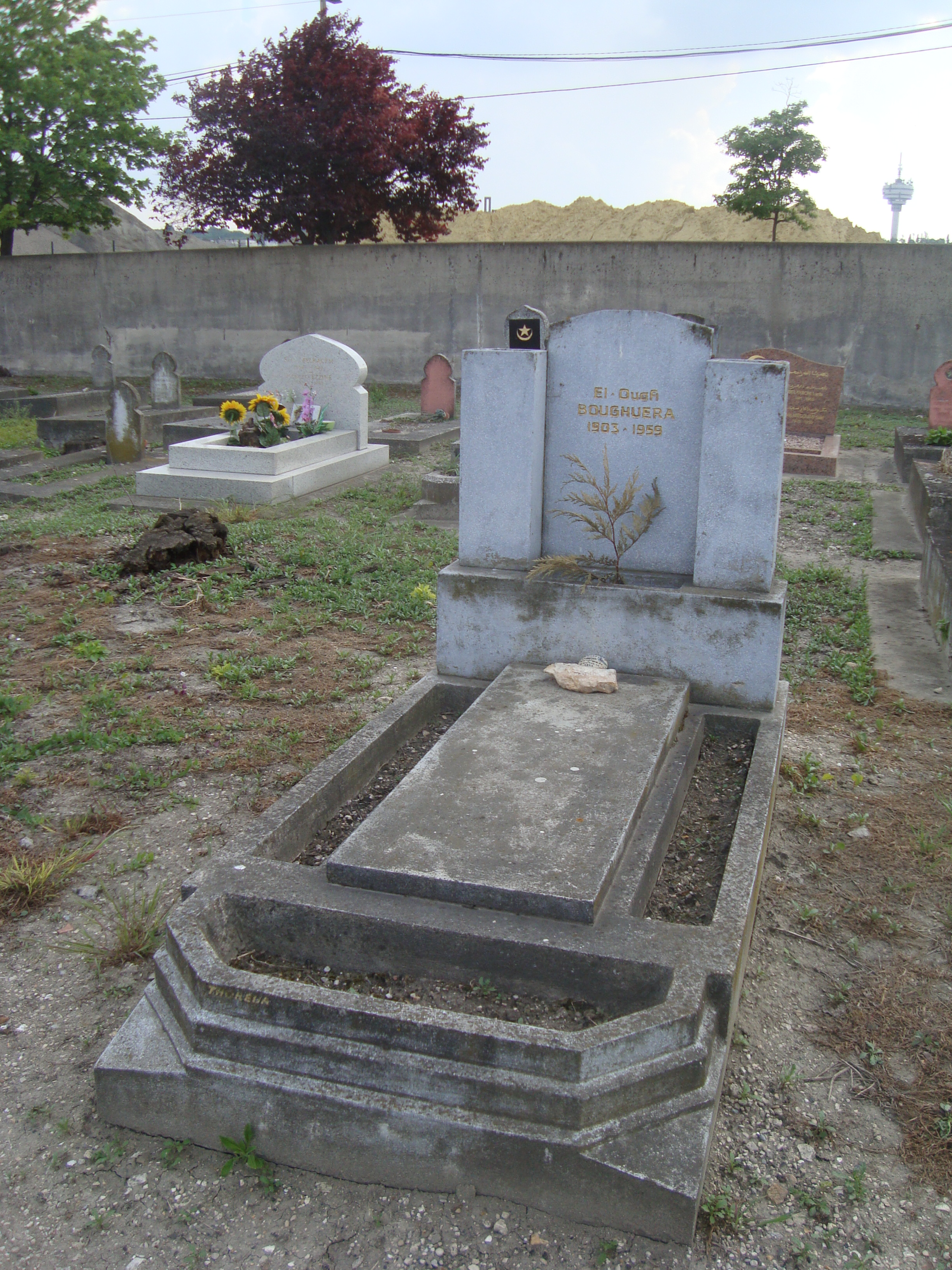
Tomb Boughera El Ouafi

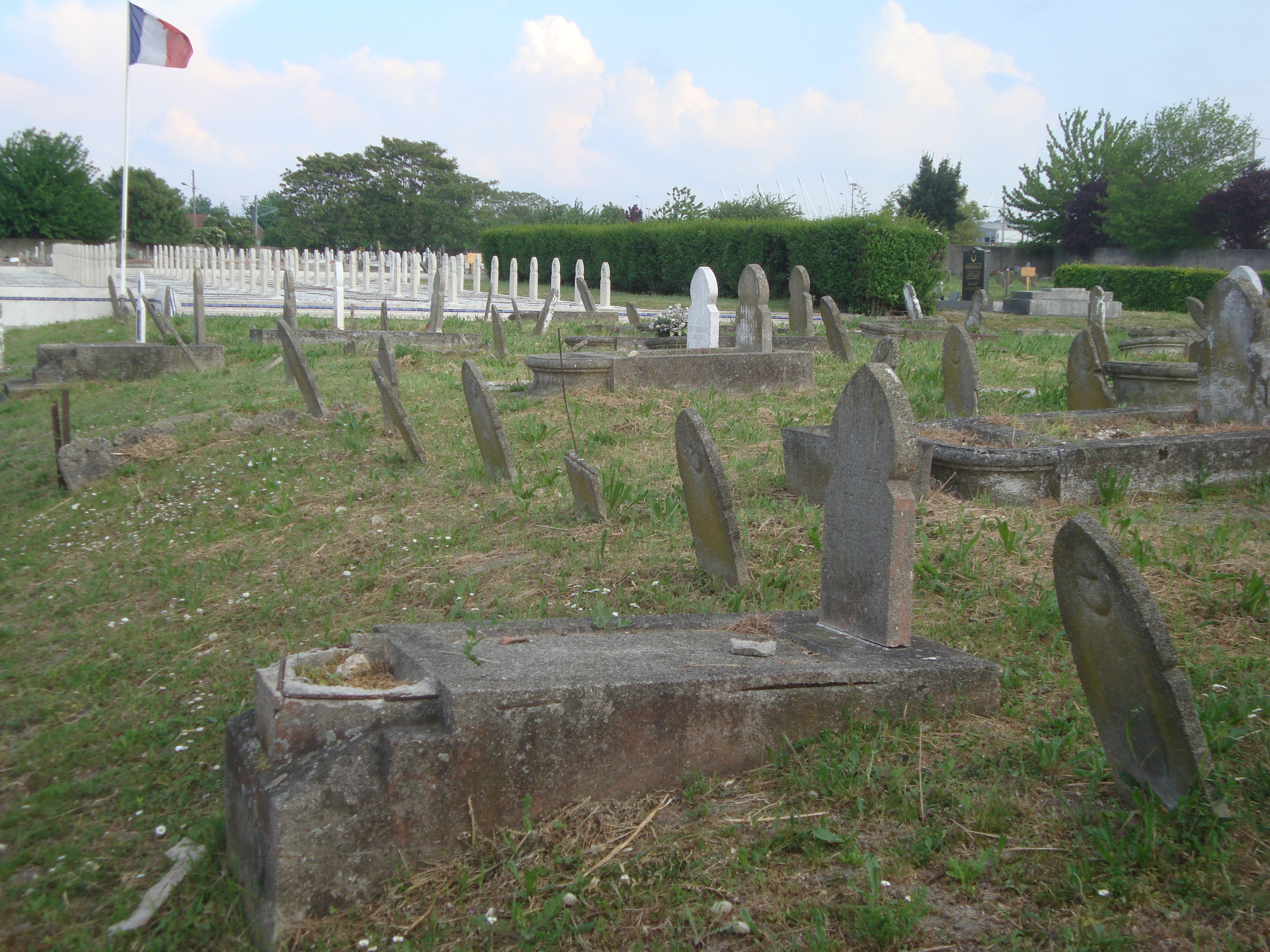
Carré militaire drapeau avec vieilles tombes
