= Şehzade Ahmed Kemaleddin =

Ottoman prince (1848–1905)

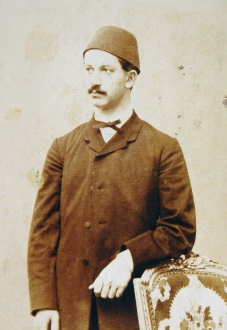
- Born: 16 July 1848; Çırağan Palace, Constantinople, Ottoman Empire
- Died: 25 April 1905 (aged 56); Beşiktaş Palace, Constantinople, Ottoman Empire
- Spouse: Sezadil Hanım (m. 1876–1905)
- Issue: Atiyetullah Sultan; Münire Sultan
Names
- Turkish: Şehzade Ahmed Kemaleddin; Ottoman Turkish: شهزادہ احمد کمالالدین
- House: Ottoman
- Father: Abdulmejid I
- Mother: Verdicenan Kadın
- Religion: Sunni Islam

Şehzade Ahmed Kemaleddin Efendi (Ottoman Turkish: شهزادہ احمد کمال الدین; 16 July 1848 - 25 April 1905) was an Ottoman prince, son of Sultan Abdulmejid I and his consort Verdicenan Kadın.

== Early life ==
Şehzade Ahmed Kemaleddin was born on 16 July 1848 in the Çırağan Palace. His father was Sultan Abdulmejid I, son of Sultan Mahmud II and Bezmiâlem Sultan. His mother was Verdicenan Kadın, daughter of Prince Kaytuk Giorgi Achba and Princess Yelizaveta Hanım. He had an elder full sister, Münire Sultan. In 1861 his mother adopted a four-year old Mediha Sultan, daughter of Abdülmecid I and Gülistu Kadin and so half-sister of Ahmed Kemaleddin, who had just lost both parents.

Kemaleddin and his brothers, Princes Mehmed Reşad (future Sultan Mehmed V), Mehmed Burhaneddin, and Ahmed Nureddin were circumcised on 9 April 1857 in the Dolmabahçe Palace. After Abdulmejid's death in 1861, Kemaleddin and his mother settled in the Feriye Palace.

Kemaleddin like his brothers, Sultan Murad V and Şehzade Ahmed Nureddin joined Proodos ("Progress" in Greek) Masonic lodge in 1875. This lodge was founded in the Beyoğlu district of Istanbul in 1867, as an associate of the French lodge “Grand Orient.” The lodge's rituals were conducted in both Turkish and Greek.

== Ali Suavi incident ==
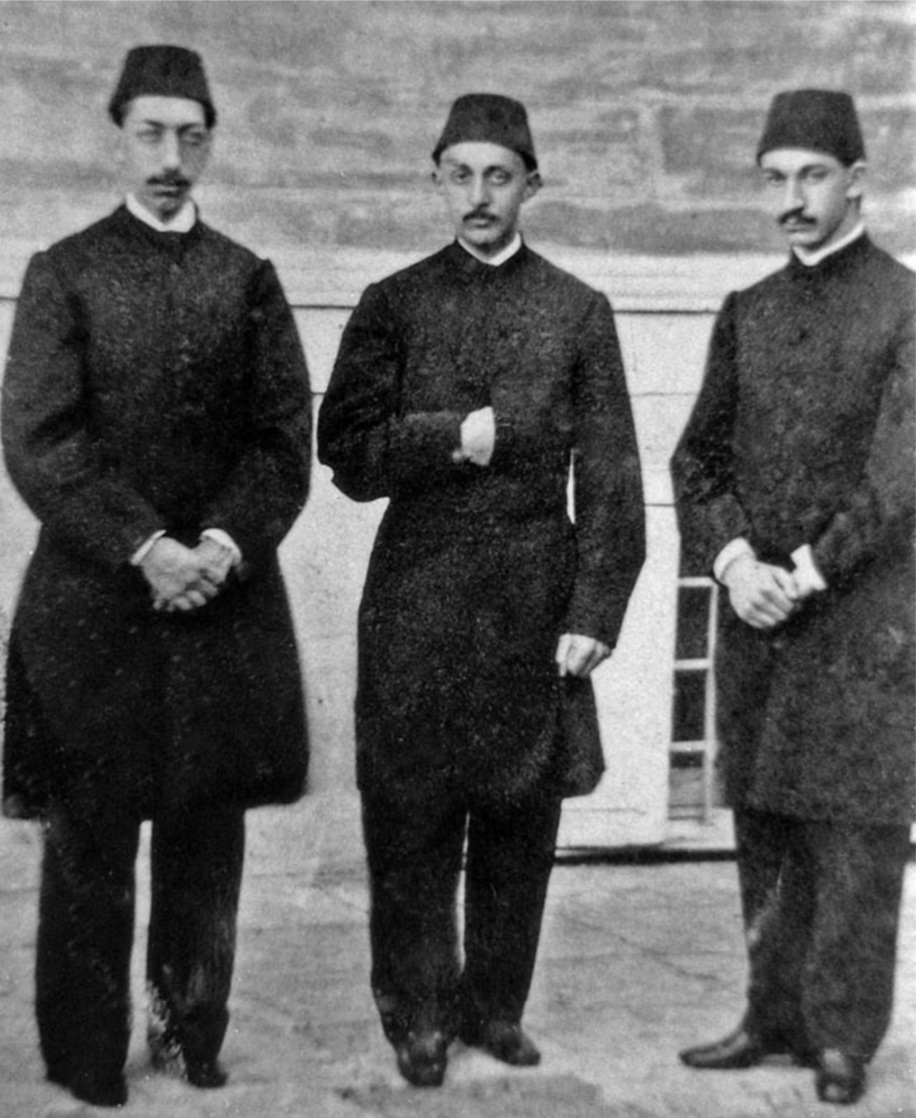
Şehzade Ahmed Kemaleddin (far right) in c. 1870

After the deposition of Sultan Murad on 30 August 1876, their half-brother, Sultan Abdul Hamid II ascended the throne, and Kemaleddin became second in line to the throne. Murad and his family were then confined to the Çırağan Palace. On 20 May 1878, an attempt was made to liberate Murad from the Çırağan Palace, and restore him to the throne. Kemaleddin and his younger half-brother Şehzade Selim Süleyman, and half-sisters, Fatma Sultan and Seniha Sultan, her husband Mahmud Celaleddin Pasha, Şevkefza Sultan, mother of Murad, and Servetseza Kadin, BaşKadin of Abdülmejid, were all involved in the plot. They all wanted to see the rightful Sultan on the throne.

The relations between Sultan Abdul Hamid II and Kemaleddin were sour. And so, he believed that Murad should be restored to the throne. It is said that in the days when Abdul Hamid was a Prince, Kemaleddin once ran into pressing financial difficulties. He applied to the wealthy Abdul Hamid for funds and even sent over valuable objects as security for a loan. But Abdul Hamid replied, "I'm no petty money changer! Since he wants to pawn something for money, let him try the money changes in the Caviar Building!" Kemaleddin took offence at this, and ever afterwards relations between the two were frosty.

During the incident Ali Suavi, the radical political opponent of Abdul Hamid's authoritarian regime stormed the palace with a band of armed refugees from the recent Russo-Turkish War. Ali Suavi's men were unable to overcome the fierce resistance of the Beşiktaş police prefect, Hacı Hasan Pasha. The plot failed, and Ali Suavi and most of his men were killed. In the aftermath, security at the Çırağan Palace was tightened. Servetseza died a few months later, according to many poisoned by Abdul Hamid II.

== Personal life ==
Kemaleddin's only wife was Fatma Sezadil Hanım. She was born in 1856 in the Caucasus. They married on 23 April 1876 in the Dolmabahçe Palace. They had two daughters, Atiyetullah Sultan, and Münire Sultan. She died on 9 February 1943 in Istanbul.

Kemaleddin was allocated apartments in the Feriye Palace, and shared the apartments of the Crown Prince located in the Dolmabahçe Palace with Şehzade Mehmed Reşad (future Sultan Mehmed V), after he became second in line to the throne in 1876. However, after the 1894 earthquake, the Crown Princes apartments were damaged, and two new pavilions, known as the "Hareket Pavilions", were constructed. Kemaleddin was then given one these pavilions. He also owned an eighteenth-century mansion in Çengelköy in the silent hills of Bosphorus. Abdul Hamid then bought this estate for Prince Mehmed Vahideddin (future Mehmed VI), and registered the deed of the property in his name.

== Death ==
Ahmed Kemaleddin died on 25 April 1905 in the Beşiktaş Palace. Although he officially died of natural causes, persistent rumors claim he was killed on the orders of Abdul Hamid II. He was buried in the royal mausoleum of Yahya Efendi, Istanbul. He was honoured posthumously, after the 1908 revolution, for his liberal leanings.

== Issue ==
Name	Birth	Death	Notes
Atiyetullah Sultan	1877	1878	died in infancy; buried in paternal mausoleum, Yahya Efendi Cemetery
Münire Sultan	5 April 1880	7 October 1939	Called as her aunt, married once, and had issue, one son, Sultanzade Ahmed Kemaleddin Bey Keredin. He married Mihriban Hanım and had issue.

== Source ==
- Brookes, Douglas Scott (January 1, 2010). The Concubine, the Princess, and the Teacher: Voices from the Ottoman Harem. University of Texas Press. ISBN 978-0-292-78335-5.
