= Münire Sultan =

Münire Sultan may refer to:

- Münire Sultan (daughter of Abdulmejid I) (1844-1862)
- Münire Sultan (daughter of Şehzade Kemaleddin) (1880-1939)
