= Mediha Sultan =

Ottoman princess, daughter of Abdulmejid I

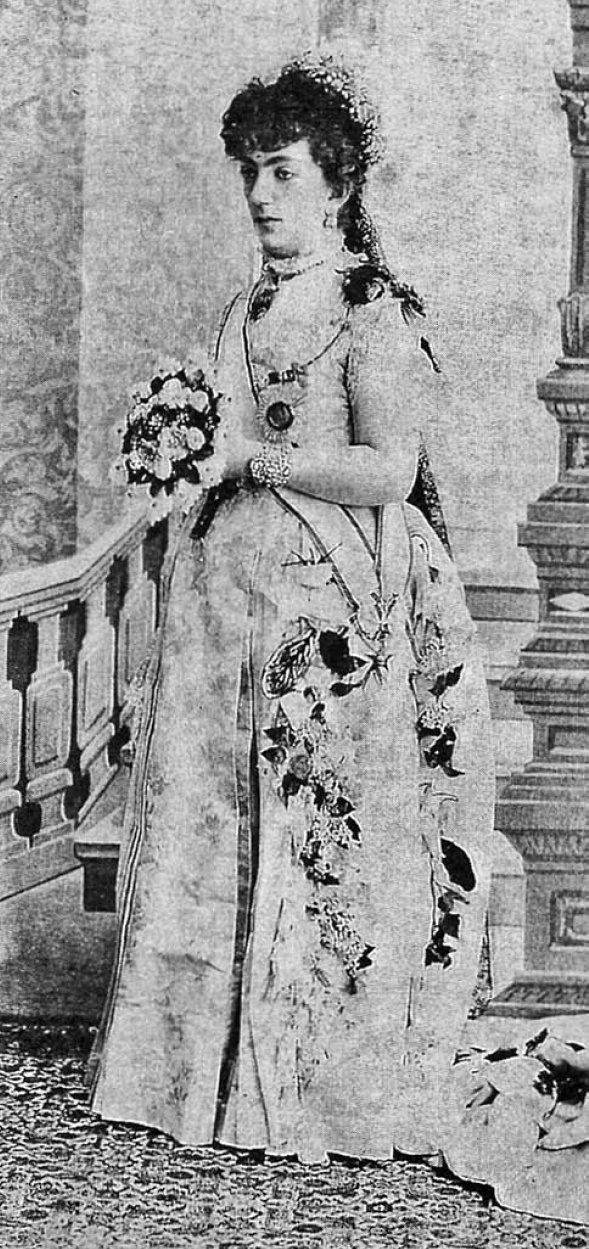
- Born: 30 July 1856; Dolmabahçe Palace, Constantinople, Ottoman Empire
- Died: 9 November 1928 (aged 72); Nice, France
- Burial: France
- Spouses: Necib Pasha (m. 1879; died 1885) Ferid Pasha (m. 1886; died 1923)
- Issue: First marriage Sultanzade Abdurrahman Sami Bey
- Dynasty: Ottoman
- Father: Abdulmejid I
- Mother: Biological; Gülistu Kadın; Adoptive; Verdicenan Kadın
- Religion: Sunni Islam

Mediha Sultan (Ottoman Turkish: مدیحه سطان; 30 July 1856 – 9 November 1928) was an Ottoman princess, the daughter of Sultan Abdulmejid I and Gülistü Kadin. She was the full sister of Sultan Mehmed VI and the half-sister of the Sultans Murad V, Abdul Hamid II and Mehmed V.

== Early life ==
Mediha Sultan was born on 30 July 1856 at the Dolmabahçe Palace. Her father was Sultan Abdulmejid I, son of Sultan Mahmud II and Bezmiâlem Sultan. Her mother was Gülistü Kadın, daughter of Prince Tahir Bey Chachba. She had two elder twin sisters Zekiye Sultan and Fehime Sultan, both of whom died in infancy, and a younger brother, Mehmed VI. In 1861 She lost both her parents, her father to tuberculosis and her mother to cholera.

She was then entrusted to the care of one other of her father's consort, Verdicenan Kadın. The relationship between the two was like mother and daughter. As Verdicenan lost her daughter Münire Sultan in 1862, she kept Mediha under close surveillance, and always helped her whenever she had problems. Her brother was entrusted to the care of Şayeste Hanim.

== First marriage ==
Mediha fell in love with Ahmed Necib Pasha, son of Sheikh Necibzade Sami Bey, whom she had happened to see. Her uncle, Sultan Abdulaziz, approved of this marriage, and the wedding preparations began during his reign. Abdul Hamid who had frowned on Necib's family because they had connections with Ali Suavi, sent Necib to Paris. It was only when Verdicenan Kadın appealed to Perestu Kadın that Necib was recalled. He was made a pasha and the marriage was arranged. Her dowry was prepared in 1876, along with that of her half-sisters Behice Sultan, Seniha Sultan and Naile Sultan. The marriage contract was concluded on 22 January 1879 and the wedding took place on 8 June at the Yıldız Palace. The couple was allocated Tarlabaşı Palace as their residence.

The two together had a son, Sultanzade Sami Bey, born in 1880, who later became personal aide-de-camp to Abdul Hamid and served in the Ertuğrul Regiment. As a member of the entourage of Şehzade Mehmed Abdülkadir, he participated in ceremonial occasions and at the Royal Mosque Processions each Friday, following on horseback behind Abdul Hamid. Mediha was widowed at Necib Pasha's death in April 1885.

== Second marriage ==
After Necib Pasha's death, Abdul Hamid betrothed her to Mehmed Ferid Pasha, in 1885. The marriage took place on 29 April 1886. Mediha Sultan's deputy was Hafız Behram Bey and Ferid Pasha's deputy was Gazi Osman Pasha, However, no children came of this marriage.

Mediha and her husband, Ferid Pasha, settled in the Baltalimanı Waterfront Palace, which had remained vacant after Fatma Sultan's death in 1884, Afterwards, her palace in Tarlabaşı was allocated to Zekiye Sultan, daughter of Sultan Abdul Hamid, who lived here after her marriage in 1889.

In October 1898, she met with the German Empress Augusta Victoria in the harem of the Yıldız Palace, when the latter visited Istanbul with her husband Emperor Wilhelm II. In her memoir, Ayşe Sultan, daughter of Abdul Hamid II, remembered: "Familiar as he was with his sisters' (Seniha Sultan and Mediha Sultan) habit of chattering away rapidly and guffawing, Abdülhamid II had counselled and beseeched them to behave in a dignified fashion, but nonetheless the sisters fell back on their old habits. Baba ("dad", the Sultan Abdul Hamid II) felt compelled to tell the Empress, "Please forgive my sisters, they're a bit nervous."

Mediha was widowed at Ferid Pasha's death in 1923.

== Death ==
At the fall of Sultanate in 1922, Mediha Sultan went to live in Nice, France, where her husband died. Afterwards, she moved first to Menton and later to Sanremo, with her brother Mehmed VI. After his death in 1926 she returned to Nice, where she died on 9 November 1928, at the age of seventy-two. In her final years she was on bad terms with her son. He refused to take care of her and did not go to her funeral. She was buried in Nice.

== Personality ==
Mediha was fond of European ways. She dressed in European styles with gowns and long trains. She was thin with pale skin and black eyes, apparently resembling her father. Her sister, Seniha Sultan, was fond of her, saying that she spoke with an air of good humour in her voice. When these two sisters were together chatting with their brother Sultan Abdul Hamid, they would both laugh and try to amuse him and get him to smile as though they were in competition with one another.

== Honours ==
Styles of Mediha Sultan
- Reference style: Her Imperial Highness
- Spoken style: Your Imperial Highness

- Order of the House of Osman
- Order of the Medjidie, Jeweled
- Order of Charity, 1st Class
- Hicaz Demiryolu Medal in Gold
- Iftikhar Sanayi Medal in Gold

== Issue ==
Name	Birth	Death	Notes
By Necib Pasha (married 22 January 1879; died April 1885)
Sultanzade Abdurrahman Sami Bey	1880	1961	born in Tarlabaşı Palace; married firstly in Baltalimanı Palace in 1903 to Peyveste Devlethan Hanım (Bandırma, 1886 – 1964, London), a Circassian from the Ubykh tribe, and had three sons, Mehmed Bahaeddin Sami, Ahmed Rükneddin Sami, and Ömer Fethi Sami, and two daughters Fatma Kâmran Sami, and Hatice Gülistü Sami, married secondly to Dilbeste Hanım, sister of Peyveste Devlethan Hanım, and had Mustafa Saib Sami, married thirdly to Dilnigar Hanım, lady-in-waiting to Peyveste Devlethan Hanım, and had Mahmud Ekrem Sami; died in London, England

== See also ==
- List of Ottoman princesses

== Sources ==
- Brookes, Douglas Scott (2010). The Concubine, the Princess, and the Teacher: Voices from the Ottoman Harem. University of Texas Press. ISBN 978-0-292-78335-5.
- Kahya, Özge (2012). Sultan Abdülmecid'in kızı Mediha Sultan'ın hayatı (1856-1928) (Postgraduate Thesis) (in Turkish). Marmara University Institute of Social Sciences.
- Sakaoğlu, Necdet (2008). Bu mülkün kadın sultanları: Vâlide sultanlar, hâtunlar, hasekiler, kadınefendiler, sultanefendiler. Oğlak Yayıncılık. ISBN 978-9-753-29623-6.
- Uluçay, Mustafa Çağatay (2011). Padişahların kadınları ve kızları. Ankara: Ötüken. ISBN 978-9-754-37840-5.
