= Münire Sultan (daughter of Şehzade Kemaleddin) =

- Born: 5 April 1880; Dolmabahçe Palace, Constantinople, Ottoman Empire (now Istanbul, Turkey)
- Died: 7 October 1939 (aged 59); Nice, France
- Burial: Nice, France
- Spouse: Mehmed Salih Pasha (m. 1907; executed 1913)
- Issue: Sultanzade Ahmed Kemaleddin Bey
- Dynasty: Ottoman
- Father: Şehzade Ahmed Kemaleddin
- Mother: Fatma Sezadil Hanım
- Religion: Sunni Islam

Münire Sultan (Ottoman Turkish: منیره سلطان; 5 April 1880 – 7 October 1939) was an Ottoman princess, the daughter of Şehzade Ahmed Kemaleddin, the son of Sultan Abdulmejid I.

== Early life ==
Münire Sultan was born on 5 April 1880 in the Dolmabahçe Palace by Şehzade Ahmed Kemaleddin and Fatima Sezadil Hanım. She was named in honor of her paternal aunt, Münire Sultan, her father's full sister. She was the second child born to her father and mother. She had a sister, Atiyetullah Sultan, two years elder then her, who died as a child. She was the granddaughter of Sultan Abdulmejid I and Verdicenan Kadın.

== Marriage ==
In 1907, Abdul Hamid arranged her marriage to Mehmed Salih Pasha, son of Grand Vizier Hayreddin Pasha the Tunisian, by his fourth wife, Kamer Hanım. Salih Pasha was one of Sultan Abdulmejid's grand viziers. The marriage took place on 10 January 1907 in the Yıldız Palace. The two together had a son, Sultanzade Ahmed Kemaleddin Bey, born on 18 June 1908 in the Nişantaşı Palace. Salih Pasha was accused of involvement in the assassination of the grand vizier General Mahmud Shevket Pasha and was condemned to death in 1913. Münire and her mother Sezadil solicited Sultan Mehmed V to not sign the death sentence, but the sultan approved the sentence without any objection, and so Salih Pasha was hanged on 11 June 1913.

== Exile and death ==
Upon the exile of the imperial family in March 1924, Münire Sultan and her son settled firstly in Tunisia where they lived for four years and later settled in Nice, France. Here the two had very few financial means. And she was not around much, as she was still mourning the death of her husband. She died on 7 October 1939, aged 59, and was buried there.

== Honours ==
- Order of the House of Osman
- Order of the Medjidie, Jeweled
- Order of Charity, 1st Class
- Hicaz Demiryolu Medal in Gold

== Issue ==
Name	Birth	Death	Notes
Sultanzade Ahmed Kemaleddin Bey "Keredin"	18 June 1908	7 January 1987	Born in Nişantaşı Palace; Married in June 1962 to Mihriban Hanım "Keredin" with issue; Died in Istanbul, Turkey, and buried in Karacaahmet Cemetery;

== Ancestry ==
Ancestors of Münire Sultan (daughter of Şehzade Kemaleddin)

8. Mahmud II
4. Abdulmejid I
9. Bezmiâlem Sultan
2. Şehzade Ahmed Kemaleddin
10. Kaytuk Giorgi Achba
5. Verdicenan Kadın
11. Yelizaveta Hanım
1. Münire Sultan
3. Fatma Sezadil Hanım

== Source ==
- Brookes, Douglas Scott (2010). The Concubine, the Princess, and the Teacher: Voices from the Ottoman Harem. University of Texas Press. ISBN 978-0-292-78335-5.
