= Nesrin Hanım =

Consort of Sultan Abdulmejid I (1826–1853)

- Born: c. 1826; Georgia, Caucasus Viceroyalty, Russian Empire
- Died: 2 January 1853 (aged 26–27); Constantinople, Ottoman Empire (now Istanbul, Turkey)
- Burial: New Mosque, Istanbul
- Spouse: Abdulmejid I (m. 1842)
- Issue: Şehzade Mehmed Ziyaeddin; Behice Sultan; Şehzade Mehmed Nizameddin; Şehzade Mehmed Bahaeddin
Names
- Turkish: Nesrin Hanım; Ottoman Turkish: نسرین خانم
- House: Ottoman (by marriage)
- Father: Manuçar Bey Asemiani
- Mother: Mahra Hanım
- Religion: Sunni Islam

Nesrin Hanım (Ottoman Turkish: نسرین خانم; "wild rose", 1826 – 2 January 1853) was a consort of Sultan Abdulmejid I of the Ottoman Empire.

== Life ==
She was Georgian, daughter of the noble Manuçar Bey Asemiani and his wife Mahra Hanim, and was chosen by Abdulmejid's mother, Bezmiâlem Sultan, as consort (concubine) for her son. She married Abdulmejid in 1842. She was given the title of "Third Ikbal" and later "Second Ikbal". The same year, she gave birth to her first child, a son Şehzade Mehmed Ziyaeddin. The prince died young. On 26 August 1848, she gave birth to her second child, a daughter, Behice Sultan in the Old Çırağan Palace.

In 1850, she gave birth to twins, Şehzade Mehmed Nizameddin and Şehzade Mehmed Bahaeddin. Abdulmejid was on a trip in Anatolia, and received the news of their birth through his mother, Bezmiâlem Sultan. Both the princes died young.

She died on 2 January 1853 of tuberculosis and grief over the loss of her three children, and was buried in the New Mosque, Istanbul. Following her death, her daughter Behice Sultan was placed under the care of Şayeste Hanım.

== Issue ==
| Name | Birth | Death | Notes |
|---|---|---|---|
| Şehzade Mehmed Ziyaeddin | 22 April 1842 | 27 April 1845 | Buried in New Mosque |
| Behice Sultan | 26 August 1848 | 21 December 1876 | After her mother's death, She was adopted by Şayeste Hanım. Married once without issue |
| Şehzade Mehmed Bahaeddin | 24 June 1850 | 9 November 1852 | Twin brother of Nizameddin, buried in New Mosque |
| Şehzade Mehmed Nizameddin | 24 June 1850 | 1852 | Twin brother of Burhaneddin, buried in New Mosque |

== In literature ==
- Nesrin is a character in Hıfzı Topuz's historical novel Abdülmecit: İmparatorluk Çökerken Sarayda 22 Yıl: Roman (2009).

== See also ==
- Ikbal (title)
- Ottoman Imperial Harem
- List of consorts of the Ottoman sultans

== Sources ==
- Brookes, Douglas Scott (2010). The Concubine, the Princess, and the Teacher: Voices from the Ottoman Harem. University of Texas Press. ISBN 978-0-292-78335-5.
- Paşa, Ahmed Cevdet (1960). Tezâkir. [2]. 13 - 20, Volume 2. Türk Tarih Kurumu Basımevi.
- Sakaoğlu, Necdet (2008). Bu Mülkün Kadın Sultanları: Vâlide Sultanlar, Hâtunlar, Hasekiler, Kandınefendiler, Sultanefendiler. Oğlak Yayıncılık. ISBN 978-6-051-71079-2.
- Uluçay, M. Çağatay (2011). Padişahların kadınları ve kızları. Ötüken. ISBN 978-9-754-37840-5.
