= Behice Sultan =

Ottoman princess, daughter of Sultan Abdulmejid I

- Born: 26 August 1848; Old Çırağan Palace, Constantinople, Ottoman Empire
- Died: 21 December 1876 (aged 28); Kuruçeşme Palace, Constantinople, Ottoman Empire
- Burial: Gülistu Kadın Mausoleum, Fatih Mosque, Istanbul
- Spouse: Halil Hamid Bey (m. 1876)
- Dynasty: Ottoman
- Father: Abdulmejid I
- Mother: Biological; Nesrin Hanım; Adoptive; Şayeste Hanım
- Religion: Sunni Islam

Behice Sultan (Ottoman Turkish: بهيجه سلطان; 26 August 1848 – 21 December 1876) was an Ottoman princess, daughter of Sultan Abdulmejid I and Nesrin Hanım. She was the half-sister of four Ottoman Sultans: Murad V, Abdul Hamid II, Mehmed V, and Mehmed VI.

== Early life ==
Behice Sultan was born on 26 August 1848 in the Old Çırağan Palace. Her father was Sultan Abdulmejid I, and her mother was Nesrin Hanım. She was the second child of her mother. She had three brothers, Şehzade Mehmed Ziyaeddin, who was two years older, and two younger twin brothers Şehzade Mehmed Nizameddin and Şehzade Mehmed Bahaeddin. Her birth coincided only few days before Eid-ul-Fitr and therefore the celebrations had doubled in the city.

After her mother's death in 1853, when Behice was five, she was adopted by Abdulmejid's consort, Şayeste Hanım, who that time had given birth to a stillborn son. In 1856, she would give birth to her only surviving child, a daughter Naile Sultan. Şayeste would also later adopt Şehzade Mehmed Vahideddin (future Mehmed VI), following the death of his mother Gülistu Kadın.

Behice was educated at the palace, and as was the custom, she received religious education. Following her religious education, she was educated in French, Persian and music. Behice was also taught to play the piano along with her half-sisters Refia Sultan and Münire Sultan, which they learnt from Therese Romano. In addition to the piano, she also learnt to play the violin and kemençe. Behice was also interested in history and literature and was in habit of reading newspapers and magazines.

During the reign of her father, her daily stipend was 3500 kuruş. In 1860, it was massively increased to 20,000 kuruş. In 1870, during the reign of her uncle Abdulaziz, her daily stipend decreased to 15,000 kuruş.

== Marriage ==
=== Engagement ===
Behice contracted tuberculosis as a child and lived all her life in isolation and supervised by foreign doctors. Her family, in particular her half-sisters Refia Sultan and Seniha Sultan often wrote her letters to cheer her up. Behice was frustrated by her isolation and envied the freedom and health of her sisters. She was ever very sensible and delicate. Her greatest wish was to get married. Her father prepared her dowry and chose a groom to make her happy, but he always delayed the wedding because he didn't think she was healthy enough. When her uncle Abdulaziz ascended the throne, she also asked him, who finally arranged an engagement for her.

The groom he chose was Halil Hamid Bey, the son of Mehmed Nurullah Bey, and the grandson of Halil Hamid Pasha, and six years younger than her. In 1875, Sultan Abdulaziz betrothed her to him, along with her half-sister Seniha Sultan. On that occasion, Refia wrote to Behice that she had seen her fiancée through the window and that he had seemed handsome, polite and well dressed, moreover he was also highly educated.

=== Illness ===
Tuberculosis took its victims in the palace as elsewhere in the nineteenth century. Among them was Behice Sultan. There is extant a touching letter to her from one Feleksu Kalfa, herself sick with malaria. The time of Behice's marriage was approaching, and Feleksu was happy for her that she would be going to her own palace, but at the same time, she was worried about her health. "You will be going to the country," she wrote, "where Pertev Kalfa knows many medicines." Behice was thought to be well enough to be married. Behice Sultan procured her medicines from pharmacies in Kadıköy and Beyoğlu, and also imported her medicines from France.

=== Wedding ===
Abdulaziz had ordered her trousseaux, which consisted of a gold tiara adorned with diamonds, solitaire diamond ring and four diamond-encrusted earrings. However, he died in June 1876, and was thus completely unable to address any more issues regarding her wedding, which, in turn, got further delayed because of the death of her younger half-brother Şehzade Mehmed Burhaneddin in November 1876. Finally, the wedding took place on 4 December 1876, during the reign of her elder half-brother Sultan Abdul Hamid II. The couple was given a palace at Kuruçeşme, on the Bosphorus. The princess was transferred to her palace, two days later on 6 December 1876. Next day, on 7 December, the wedding ceremony took place.

== Death ==
Behice Sultan died of tuberculosis a mere two weeks after her wedding, on 21 December 1876. She was 28, about the same age as her biological mother when she died, also of tuberculosis. She was buried in the mausoleum of Gülistu Kadın located at Fatih Mosque, Istanbul.

Her possessions were partly distributed to his sisters, in particular Naile Sultan and Mediha Sultan, and partly sold.

== See also ==
- List of Ottoman princesses

== Sources ==
- Çelikten, Havva Kılıç (2022). Sultan Abdülmecid'in kızı Behice Sultan'ın hayatı (1848-1876) (PDF) (Postgraduate Thesis) (in Turkish). Istanbul 29 May University.
- Sakaoğlu, Necdet (2008). Bu mülkün kadın sultanları: Vâlide sultanlar, hâtunlar, hasekiler, kadınefendiler, sultanefendiler. Oğlak Yayıncılık. ISBN 978-9-753-29623-6.
