= Şayeste Hanım =

Consort of Ottoman Sultan Abdulmejid I

- Born: c. 1838
- Died: 11 February 1912 (aged 73–74); Çengelköy Palace, Constantinople (now Istanbul), Ottoman Empire
- Burial: Şehzade Ahmed Kemaleddin Mausoleum, Yahya Efendi Cemetery, Istanbul
- Spouse: Abdulmejid I (m. 1851; died 1861)
- Issue: Şehzade Abdüllah; Naile Sultan; Adopted: Mehmed VI
Names
- Turkish: Şayeste Hanım; Ottoman Turkish: شایسته حانم
- House: Ottoman (by marriage)
- Religion: Sunni Islam

Şayeste Hanım (Turkish pronunciation: [ʃa̟jestʰe hanɯm]; Ottoman Turkish: شایسته خانم; "the best"; c. 1838 – 11 February 1912) was a consort of Sultan Abdulmejid I of the Ottoman Empire.

== Early life ==
Of Abkhazian origin and a member of a princely family of Inalipa, Şayeste Hanım was born in 1838. She had one sister, Hüsnidil Hanım, who was the wife of a certain Safvet Pasha. She was also related to Kabasalal Çerkes Mehmed Pasha.

== Marriage ==
Şayeste married Abdulmejid in 1851, and was given the title of "Sixth Ikbal". A year after the marriage, on 3 February 1853, she gave birth to her first child, a son, Şehzade Abdüllah, stillborn. Following her stillbirth, Behice Sultan, who mother Nesrin Hanım had died, was entrusted in her care by her father Abdulmejid.

She was elevated to the title of "Fifth Ikbal" in 1853, the title of "Fourth Ikbal" in 1854, and the title of "Third Ikbal" in 1856. On 30 September 1856, she gave birth to her second child, a daughter, Naile Sultan (also called Nadile Sultan).

In 1858–59, she commissioned a mosque in Üsküdar. She was known for living beyond her means, and was sued for non-payment of a debt. She was widowed at Abdulmejid's death on 25 June 1861.

== Widowhood ==
After Gülistü Kadın's death in 1861, her newborn son Şehzade Mehmed Vahideddin (future Mehmed VI) was entrusted to Üsküdar's care. The prince had a rough time with his overbearing stepmother, and at the age of 16 he left his stepmother's mansion with the three servants who had been serving him since childhood.

In 1876, she had her daughter, Naile Sultan, married to her relative Kabasakal Çerkeş Mehmed Paşa. Naile died four years later on 7 January 1882 at the age of 25. After Naile's death, Mehmed Pasha married Esma Sultan, the daughter of Sultan Abdulaziz in 1889.

During the reign of Abdul Hamid II, Mehmed was given a mansion in Çengelköy. On this estate, Mehmed had another house built for Şayeste. Even though he had not got along with his stepmother, with whom he had spent much of his childhood, he could not forget the struggle she had gone through while bringing him up.

In March 1898, Şayeste attended the wedding of Naime Sultan, the daughter of Sultan Abdul Hamid II and Kemaleddin Pasha, the son of Gazi Osman Pasha. Among her ladies-in-waiting was Inşirah Hanım, who would later become a consort of her adopted son Mehmed.

Ayşe Sultan, daughter of Abdul Hamid II, notes in her memoirs that during her father's reign, Şayeste would attend Ramadan celebrations, and would always sit next to Perestu Kadın. In 1912 she wrote to the sultan to obtain the money to renovate her rooms at Feriye Palace, but she died before receiving a reply.

== Death ==
Among the longest living consorts of Abdulmejid, Şayeste died on 11 February 1912 in the Çengelköy Palace at the age of about seventy-four outliving her daughter by thirty years. She was buried in the mausoleum of Şehzade Ahmed Kemaleddin in Yahya Efendi Cemetery, Constantinople, today known as Istanbul.

== Issue ==
Name	Birth	Death	Notes
Şehzade Abdüllah	3 February 1853	3 February 1853	Stillborn, unknown place of burial
Naile Sultan	30 September 1856	18 January 1882	Called also Nadile Sultan, married once without issue

== In literature ==
- Şayeste is a character in Hıfzı Topuz's historical novel Abdülmecit: İmparatorluk Çökerken Sarayda 22 Yıl: Roman (2009).

== See also ==
- Ikbal (title)
- Ottoman Imperial Harem
- List of consorts of the Ottoman sultans

== Sources ==
- Açba, Leyla (2004). Bir Çerkes prensesinin harem hatıraları. L & M. ISBN 978-9-756-49131-7.
- Uluçay, M. Çağatay (2011). Padişahların kadınları ve kızları. Ötüken. ISBN 978-9-754-37840-5.
- Sakaoğlu, Necdet (2008). Bu Mülkün Kadın Sultanları: Vâlide Sultanlar, Hâtunlar, Hasekiler, Kandınefendiler, Sultanefendiler. Oğlak Yayıncılık. ISBN 978-6-051-71079-2.
- Brookes, Douglas Scott (2010). The Concubine, the Princess, and the Teacher: Voices from the Ottoman Harem. University of Texas Press. ISBN 978-0-292-78335-5.
- Paşa, Ahmed Cevdet (1960). Tezâkir. [2]. 13 - 20, Volume 2. Türk Tarih Kurumu Basımevi.
- Bardakçı, Murat (2017). Neslishah: The Last Ottoman Princess. Oxford University Press. ISBN 978-9-774-16837-6.
