= Verdicenan Kadın =

Consort of Ottoman Sultan Abdulmejid I

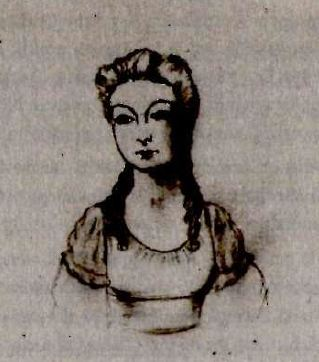
- Born: Saliha Achba Hanim c. 1825; Sukhum, Abkhazia
- Died: 9 December 1889 (aged 63–64); Feriye Palace, Constantinople, Ottoman Empire
- Burial: Imperial ladies Mausoleum, New Mosque, Istanbul, Turkey
- Spouse: Abdulmejid I (m. 1844; died 1861)
- Issue: Münire Sultan; Şehzade Ahmed Kemaleddin; Adopted: Mediha Sultan
Names
- Turkish: Saliha Verdicenan Kadın; Ottoman Turkish: وردجنان قادین
- House: Achba (by birth); Ottoman (by marriage)
- Father: Prince Kaytuk Giorgi Bey Achba
- Mother: Princess Yelizaveta Hanım
- Religion: Sunni Islam

Verdicenan Kadın (Ottoman Turkish: ورد جنان قادين; this name is composed of two words, following a naming tradition characteristic of Ottoman feminine names. Both elements are of Arabic origin: Verd (ورد), meaning “rose,” and Cenan (جنان), meaning “gardens” or “paradise.” In a more poetic sense, Cenan (جَنان) could also evoke the inner self, the heart, or one's deepest feelings. The name can therefore be interpreted as “Rose of the Garden” or, more poetically, “Rose of the Heart.”; born Saliha Achba; c. 1825 – 9 December 1889) was a consort of Sultan Abdulmejid I of the Ottoman Empire.

== Early life ==
Verdicenan Kadın was born in 1825 in Sukhum. Her original name was Saliha Achba. She was a member of the Abkhazian princely family Achba. Her father was Prince Kaytuk Giorgi Bey Achba (1793–1848), and her mother was Princess Yelizaveta Hanım (1795–1843). She had four elder siblings, two brothers, Prince Ahmet Bey Achba, and Prince Islam Musa Bey Achba, and two sisters, Princess Peremrüz Hanım Achba and Princess Embruvaz Hanım Achba, and a younger brother, Prince Mehmed Bey Achba.

Kadın was brought to Istanbul as a young child, where her father entrusted her and her sisters to the care of Bezmiâlem Sultan, the mother of Sultan Abdulmejid I. Here her name was changed to Verdicenan in accordance with the custom of the Ottoman court.

== Marriage ==
Verdicenan married Abdulmejid in 1844. She was given the title of "Sixth Kadın". On 9 December 1844, she gave birth to her first child, a daughter, Münire Sultan in the Topkapı Palace. In 1845, she was elevated to "Fifth Kadın". On 16 July 1848, she gave birth to Şehzade Ahmed Kemaleddin, in the Old Çırağan Palace. In 1851, she was elevated to "Fourth Kadın", and in 1852, to "Third Kadın". Verdicenan was known for her luxurious lifestyle and sense of style. She wore only clothes imported from Europe and luxurious jewelry; she never went out unless she was accompanied by at least ten ladies-in-waiting. Among these was Ayşe Zatimelek Hanım, who would become the fifth consort of one of Abdülmecid I's sons, Şehzade Selim Süleyman.

== Widowhood ==
After Abdulmejid's death in 1861, she moved to the Feriye Palace. Having lost her only daughter, Münire Sultan aged only 17, in 1862, she was entrusted with Mediha Sultan, after her own mother Gülistü Kadın died in 1861. The relationship between the two of them was like mother and daughter. She kept Mediha under close surveillance, and always helped her whenever she had problems. In 1879, she played a major role in Mediha's marriage to Samipashazade Necip Bey, interceding with the Sultan to allow Mediha to marry the man she loved rather than one chosen for her.

== Death ==
Verdicenan Kadın died on 9 December 1889 in the Feriye Palace at the age of sixty-four, and was buried in the mausoleum of the imperial ladies at the Yeni Mosque, Istanbul.

== Issue ==
Name	Birth	Death	Notes
Münire Sultan	9 December 1844	29 June 1862	married twice, and had issue, a son
Şehzade Ahmed Kemaleddin	16 July 1848	25 April 1905	married once, and had issue, two daughters
Mediha Sultan	30 July 1856	9 November 1918	daughter of Gülistu Kadın, she was adopted by Verdicenan after her mother's death. She married twice and had a son.

== In literature ==
- Verdicenan is a character in Hıfzı Topuz's historical novel Abdülmecit: İmparatorluk Çökerken Sarayda 22 Yıl: Roman (2009).

== See also ==
- Kadın (title)
- Ottoman Imperial Harem
- List of consorts of the Ottoman sultans

== Sources ==
- Tuna, Mahinur (2007). İlk Türk kadın ressam: Mihri Rasim (Müşfik) Açba : 1886 İstanbul-1954 New-York. As Yayın. ISBN 978-9-750-17250-2.
- Uluçay, M. Çağatay (2011). Padişahların kadınları ve kızları. Ötüken. ISBN 978-9-754-37840-5.
- Sakaoğlu, Necdet (2008). Bu Mülkün Kadın Sultanları: Vâlide Sultanlar, Hâtunlar, Hasekiler, Kandınefendiler, Sultanefendiler. Oğlak Yayıncılık. ISBN 978-6-051-71079-2.
- Kahya, Özge (2012). Sultan Abdülmecid'in kızı Mediha Sultan'ın hayatı (1856-1928).
- Brookes, Douglas Scott (2010). The Concubine, the Princess, and the Teacher: Voices from the Ottoman Harem. University of Texas Press. ISBN 978-0-292-78335-5.
- Paşa, Ahmed Cevdet (1960). Tezâkir. [2]. 13 - 20, Volume 2. Türk Tarih Kurumu Basımevi.
