= Dolmabahçe Mosque =

Historical mosque in Istanbul, Turkey

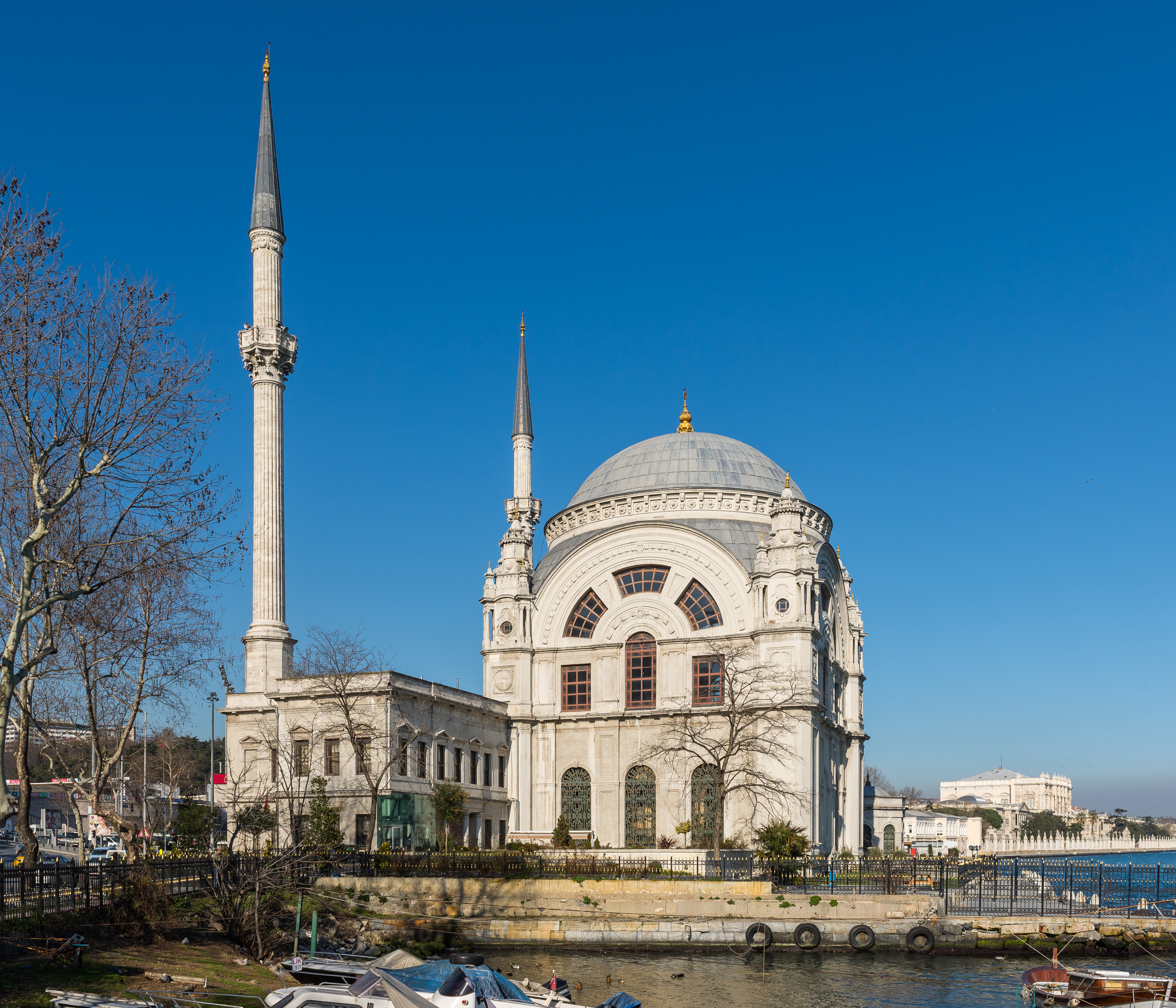

Religion
- Affiliation: Islam

Location
- Location: Istanbul, Turkey
- Interactive map of Dolmabahçe Mosque
- Coordinates: 41°02′12.22″N 28°59′43.04″E

Architecture
- Architect: Garabet Balyan
- Type: Mosque
- Style: Ottoman architecture
- Groundbreaking: 1853
- Completed: 1855

Specifications
- Minaret: 2
- Minaret height: 40.25 metres (132.05 feet)

The Dolmabahçe Mosque (Turkish: Dolmabahçe Camii) is a baroque waterside mosque in Kabataş in the Beyoğlu district of Istanbul, Turkey, close to the Dolmabahçe Palace. It was commissioned by Queen Mother Bezmialem Valide Sultan and designed by the Turkish Armenian architect, Garabet Balyan in 1855. After his mother's death, Sultan Abdülmecid saw the building work through to completion.

The mosque has twin minarets and is distinguished by the huge stone arches on its facades which are cut with large windows, allowing light to flood the interior.

From 1956 to 1960 the mosque provided a venue for the Naval Museum, only resuming prayer services in 1967. Road-widening robbed it of its courtyard and sebil that were originally part of the design.

== Background ==
In the 19th century, the Ottoman Empire covered many territories and had huge influence in Islamic arts. In the year 1853, Queen Mother Bezmialem Valide Sultan commissioned the construction of the mosque to showcase Ottoman architecture and also serve as a sacred place of worship. The site for the construction was strategic especially to the royal family as the Sultan could perform ‘Salat al-Jumuah’ which is Friday noon prayers when many Muslims gather in large congregations and pray together. The building was designed by Garabet Balyan and constructed in a unique combination of baroque, rococo and empire styles, with the goal of producing the best form of architecture. Construction of the mosque began in 1853; however, Queen Bezmi died and her son Sultan Abdülmecid completed the building in 1855.

== Features ==
The building is situated on the shores of the Bosphorus, making the location strategic and unique to visitors. A huge dome crowns the main prayer hall, while there are two tall minarets on the rear building sitting right behind the dome symmetrically. The exterior walls have many transparent glass windows that allow for the penetration of sunlight and ventilation due to the huge size of the building and its intended large capacity. Overall, the baroque style of architecture gives the building an exceptionally ornamental aesthetic that attracts utmost attention even from a distance. A closer look at the interior of the building is even mind-boggling with beautiful Arabic calligraphy on the walls and various symmetrical shapes in gold. At the center of the calligraphy are the two most inspiring Islamic themes “Allah, subhanahu wa ta'ala” and “Mohammad, sallallahu alaihi wasallam” in yellow text and green background. The ceiling is decorated with floral designs and a huge sparkling chandelier hangs right in the center. The marble floor is covered with carpets for the purpose of prayers.

== Withstanding seismic activities ==
Over the years, Dolmabahçe Mosque has withstood several seismic activities. Professor Ahmet Murat Turk (PhD. Civil Engineering) of Istanbul Kultur University and Cumhur Cosgun (PhD. Structural Engineering) of Istanbul Kultur University in their paper “Seismic behaviour and Retrofit of Historic Masonry Minaret”, analyzed the dynamic behavior of the block masonry minaret of Dolmabahçe Mosque. The Ottoman Empire was in a region with high seismicity and therefore the minarets of Dolmabahce Mosque are vulnerable. Indeed, despite the elegant architecture, the west side minaret has encountered damages due to seismic activities in the region and has recently been restored. Seismic analysis of the Dolmabahçe Mosque as presented in the book Reflections on Seismic Design by Mentor Llunji, reveals the minaret hidden strength, likely in the form of increased energy dissipation and tensile capacity provided by the lead-filled anchors. Otherwise, the seismic analysis presented in the book showed that the minaret requires strengthening.

== Significance ==
A late 19th century photograph of the mosque by the Abdullah Brothers.

Dolmabahce Palace was home to the Ottoman crown and the official residence of the Sultan. Dolmabahce Mosque thus served as the official mosque of the palace making it an important monument in the Ottoman Empire due to its proximity. It also served as mosque for ‘Salat al-Jumuah’ (Friday prayer mosque) as well as prayer grounds for foreign dignitaries and ambassadors from other parts of the Muslim world who visited the Sultan. Dolmabahçe Mosque, besides being a place for prayer, also uplifts the image of the Sultan among Arabs Muslims and Persians as a devoted Muslim who was willing to strive in Jihad by sacrificing his wealth for the course of Islam.

== Gallery ==
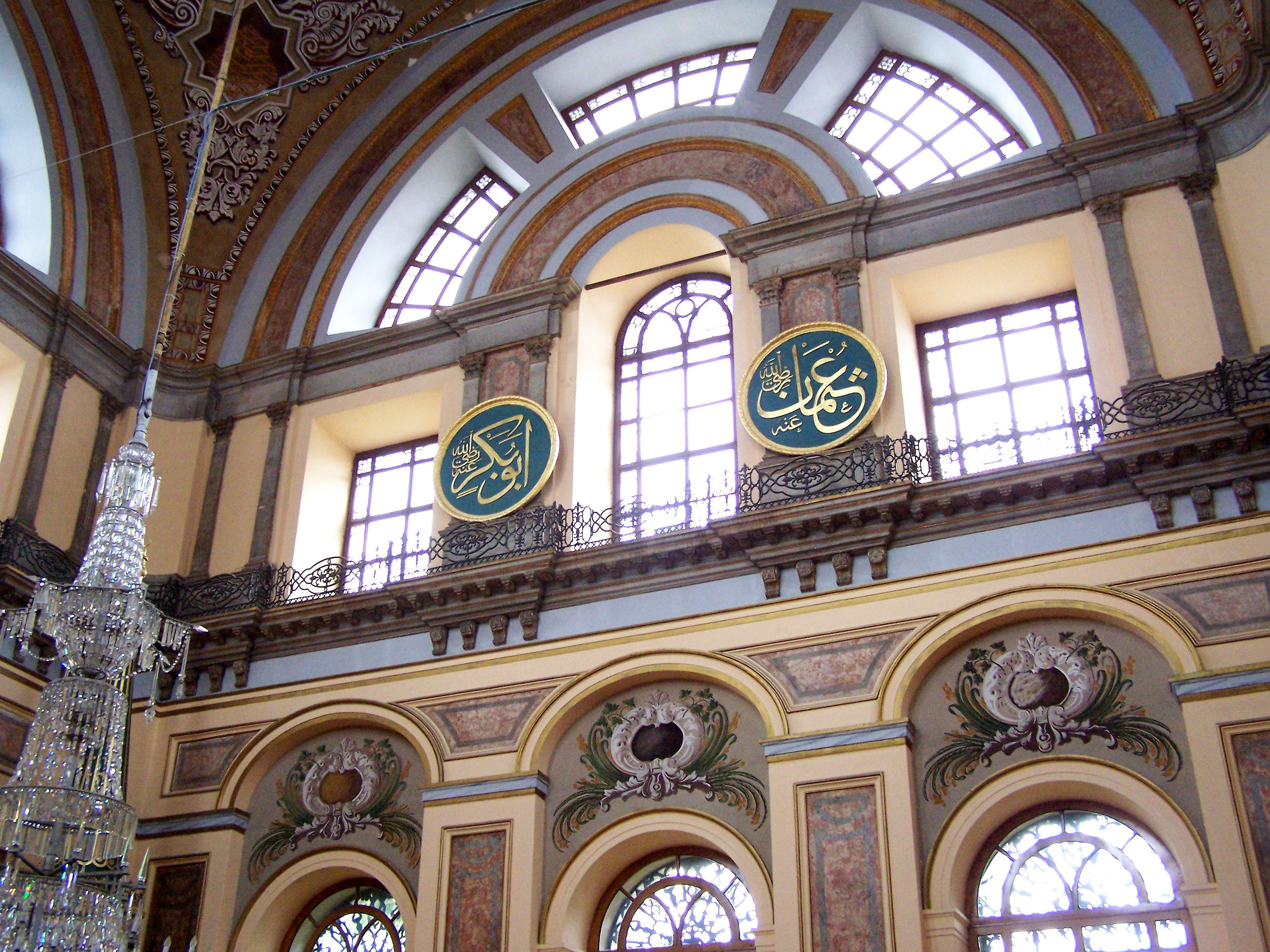
Interior of the Dolmabahçe Mosque

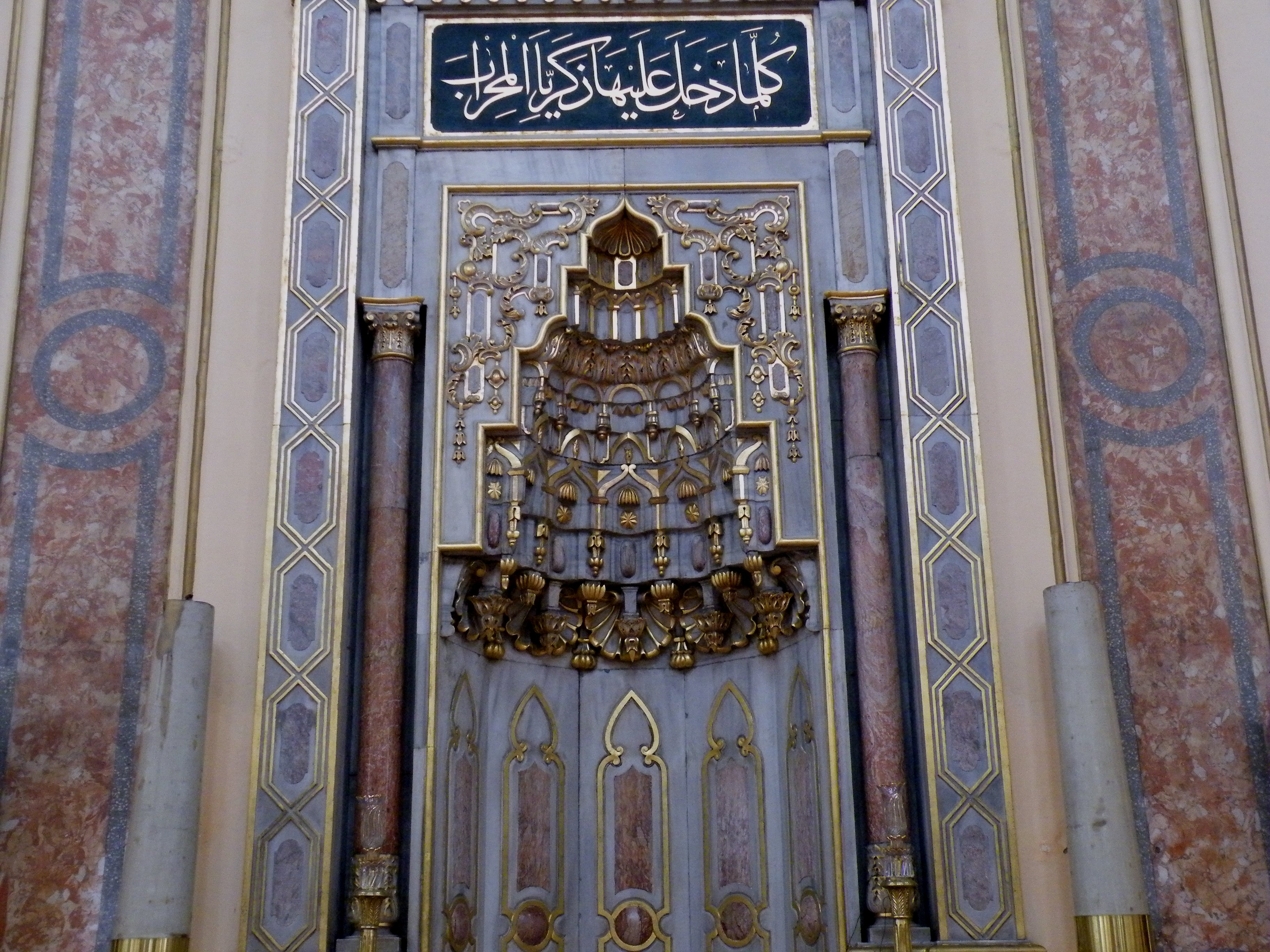
Detail of the mihrab of Dolmabahçe Mosque

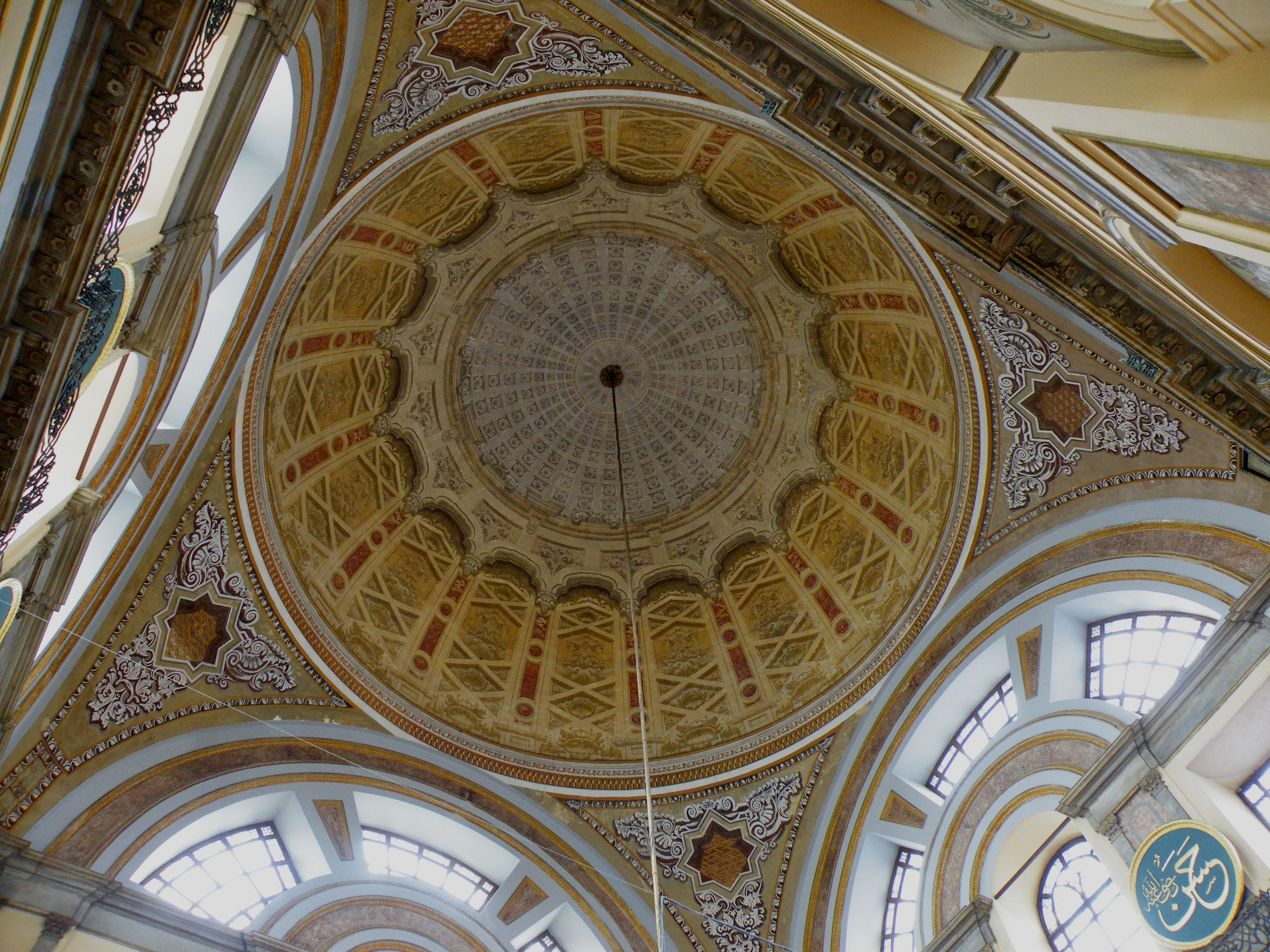
The Dome in the Dolmabahçe Mosque

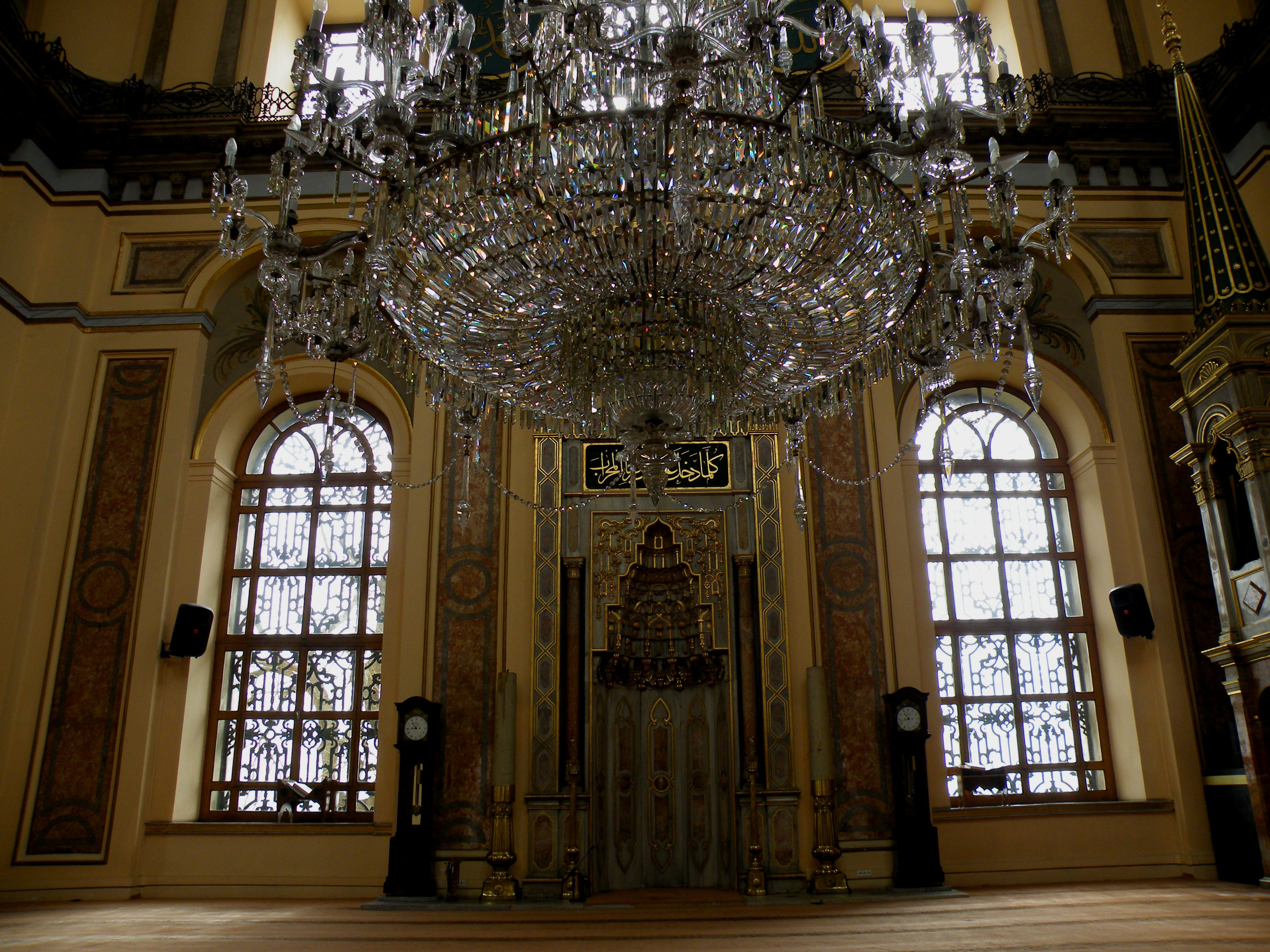
The mihrab at Dolmabahçe Mosque

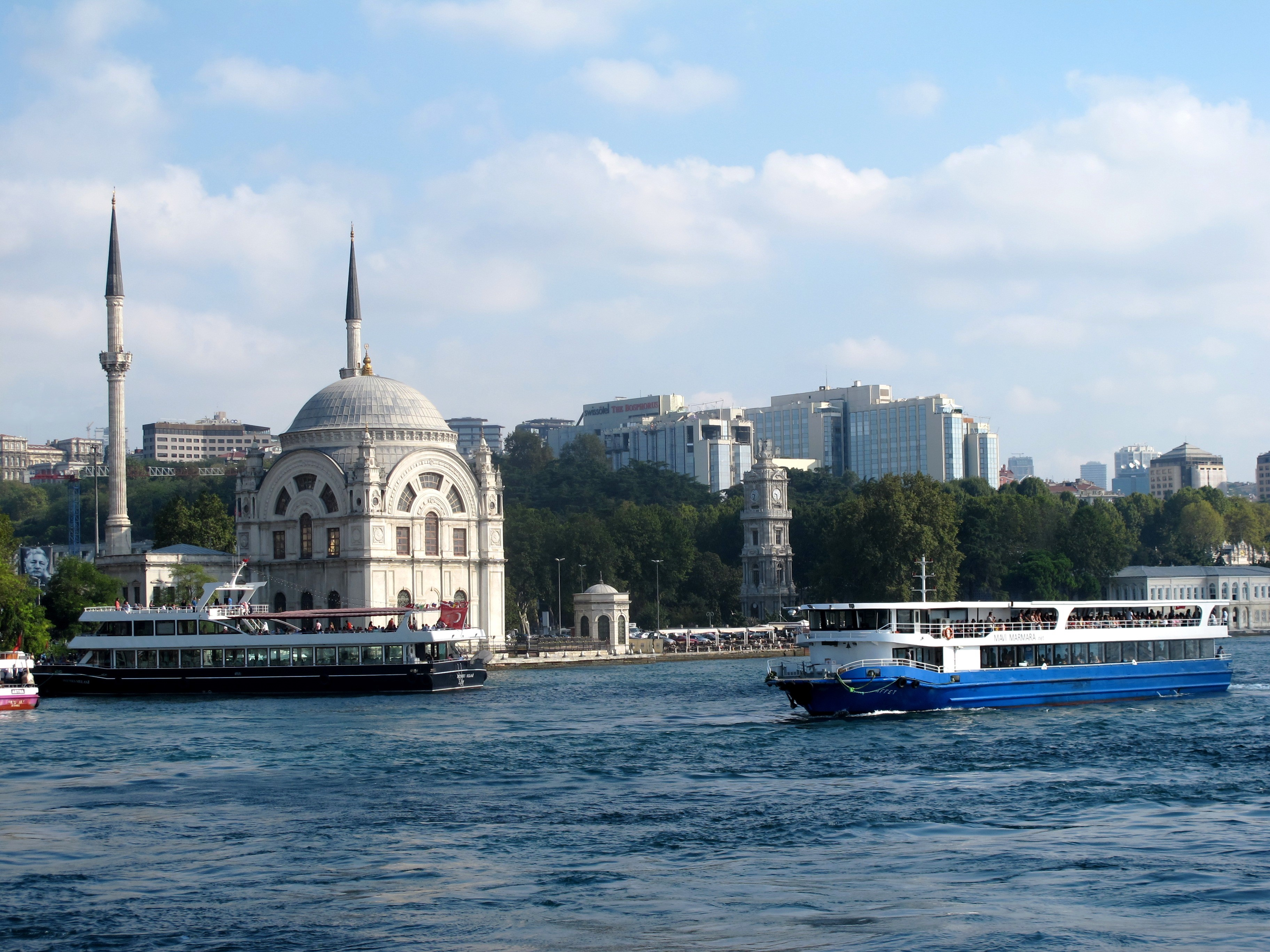
View of the Dolmabahçe Mosque from sea

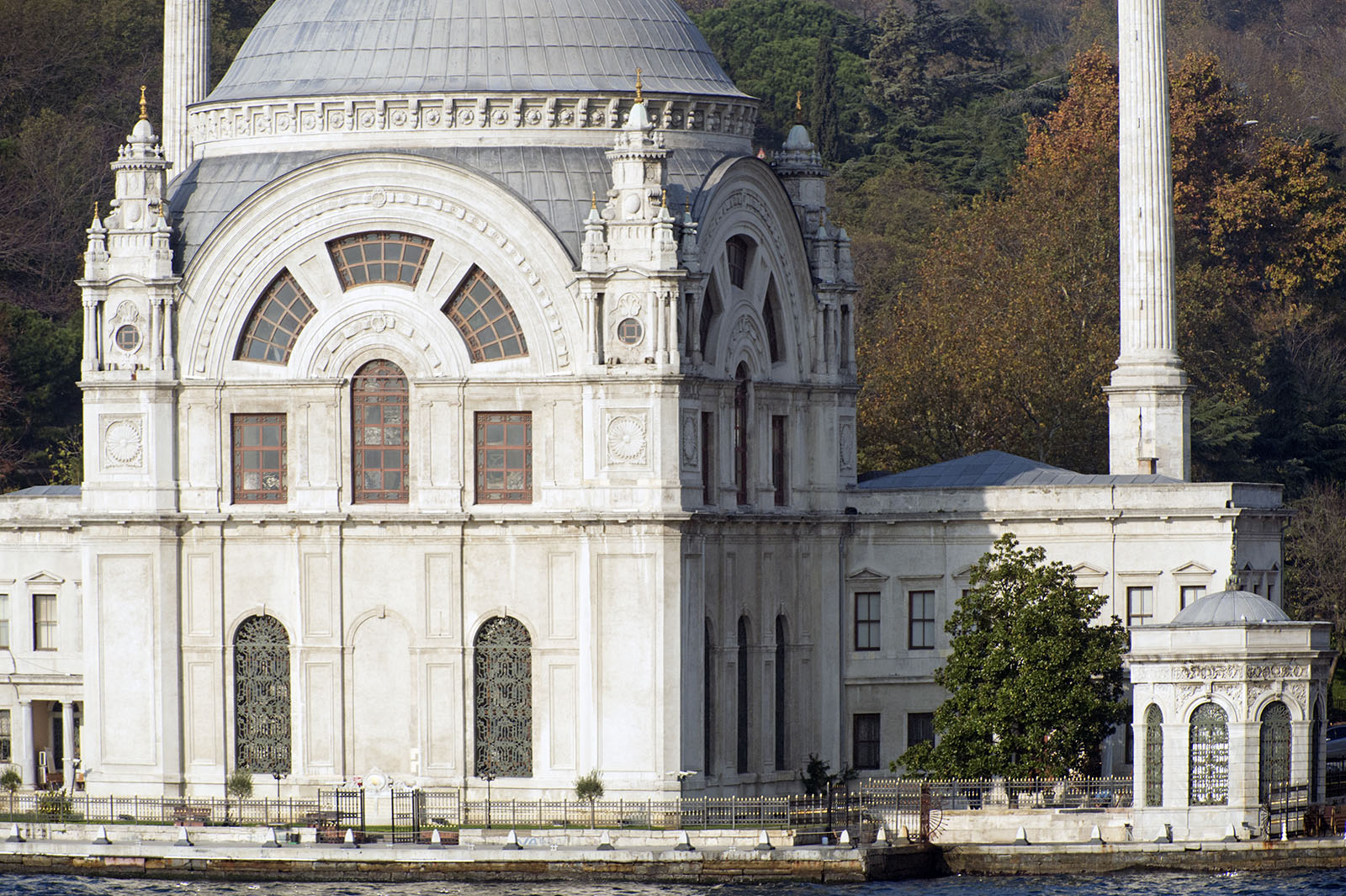
Dolmabahçe Mosque from Bosporus

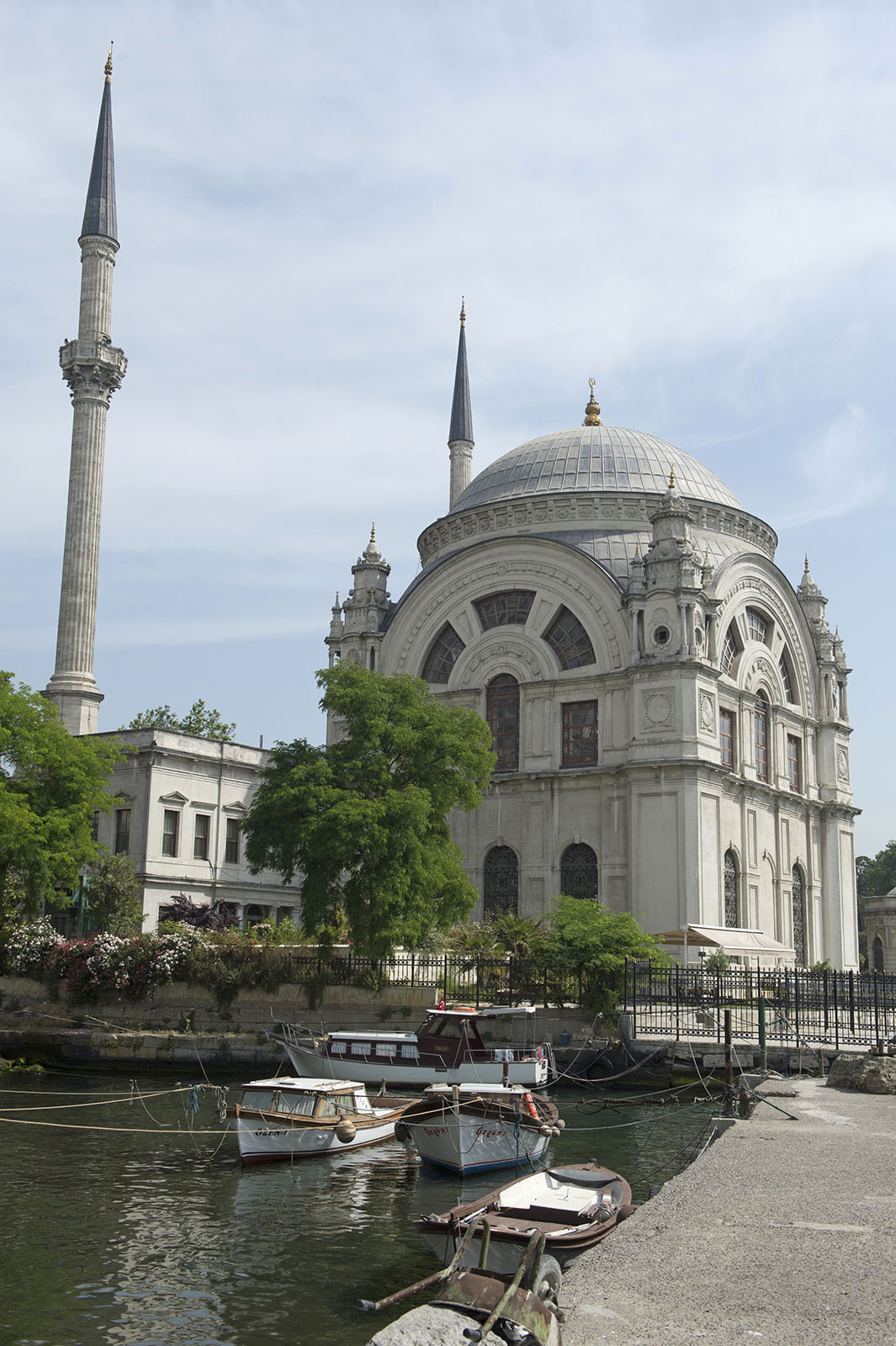
Dolmabahçe Mosque from nearby harbour

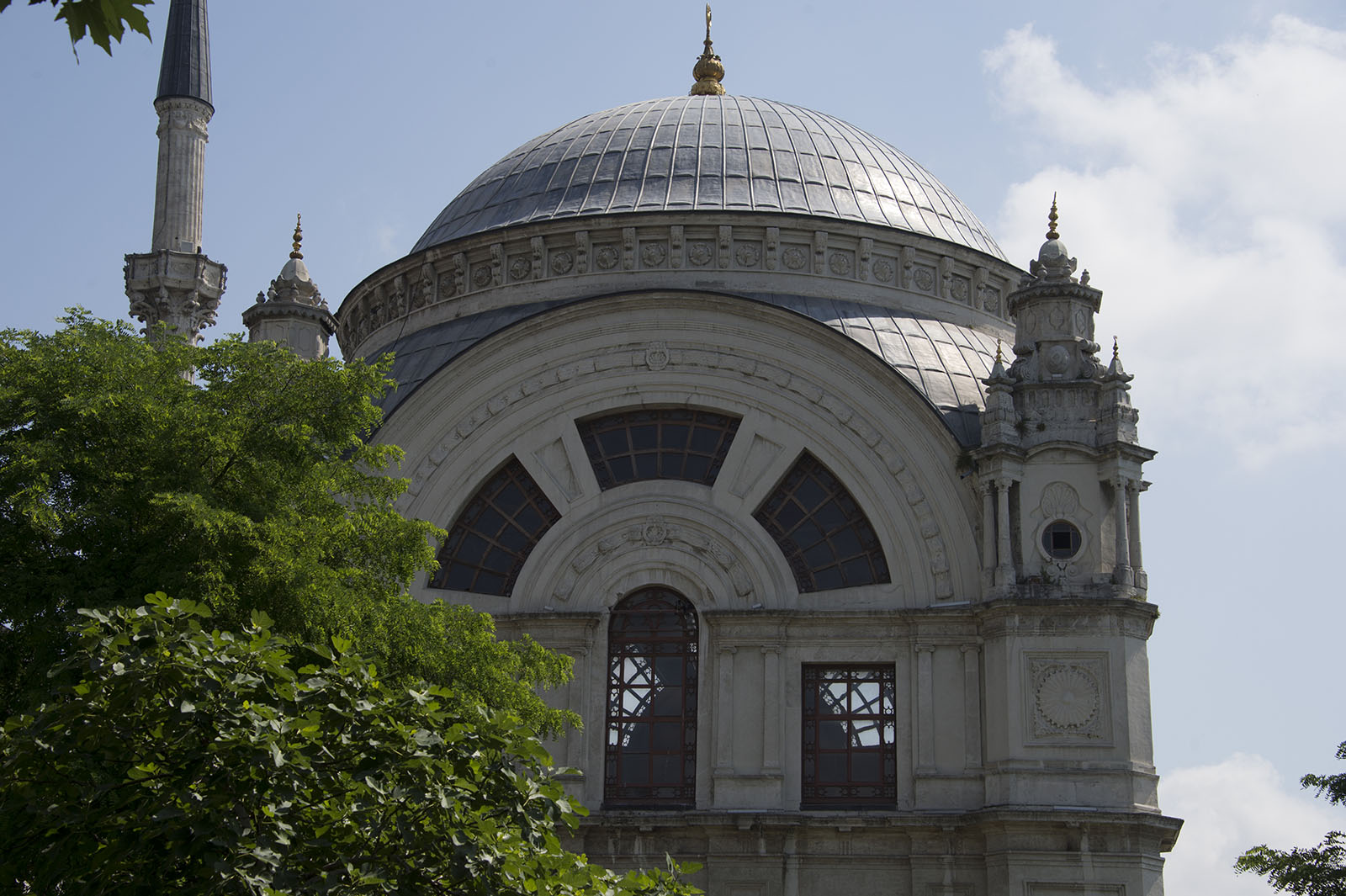
Dolmabahçe Mosque from west

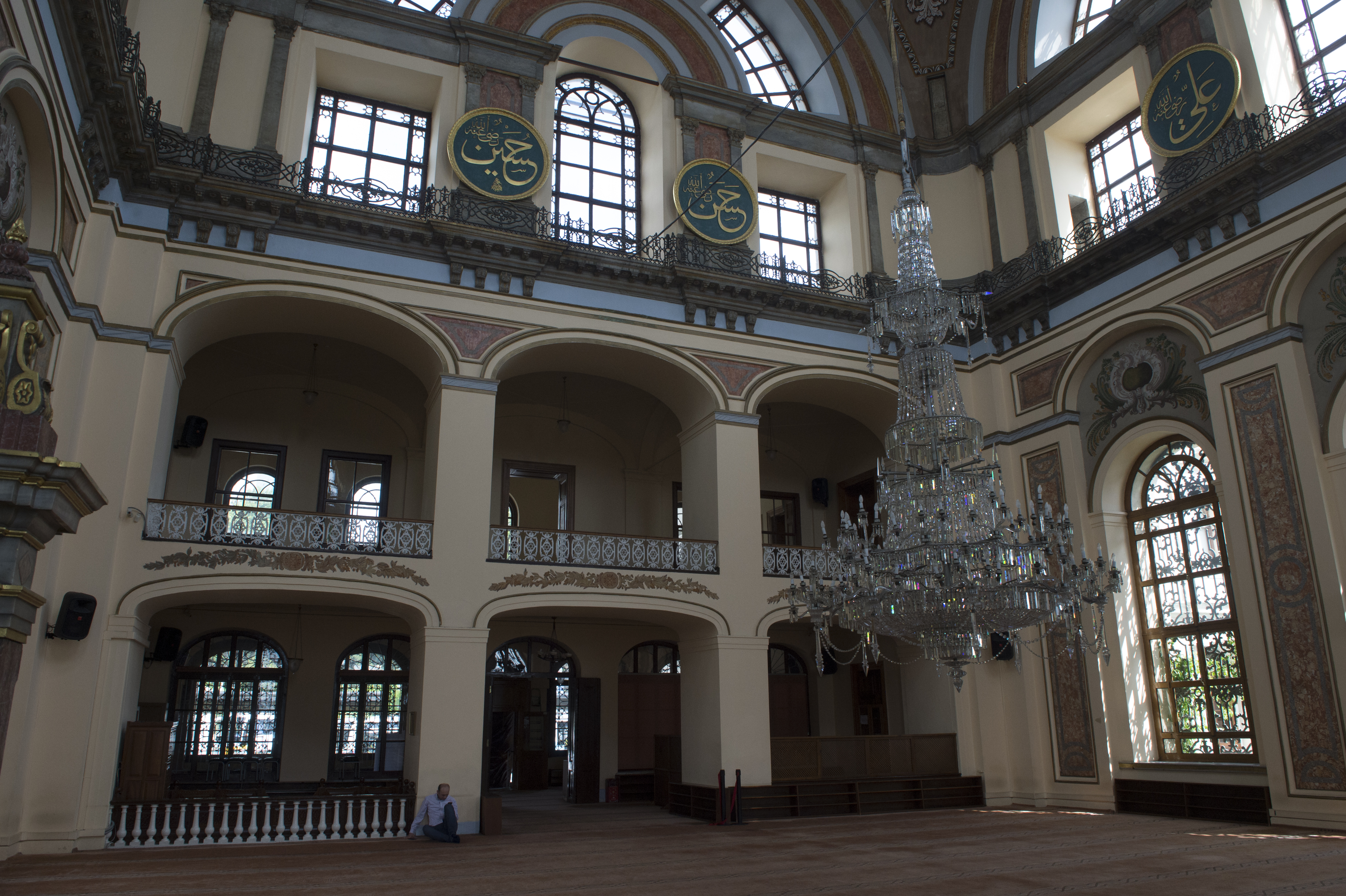
Dolmabahçe Mosque interior view towards entrance

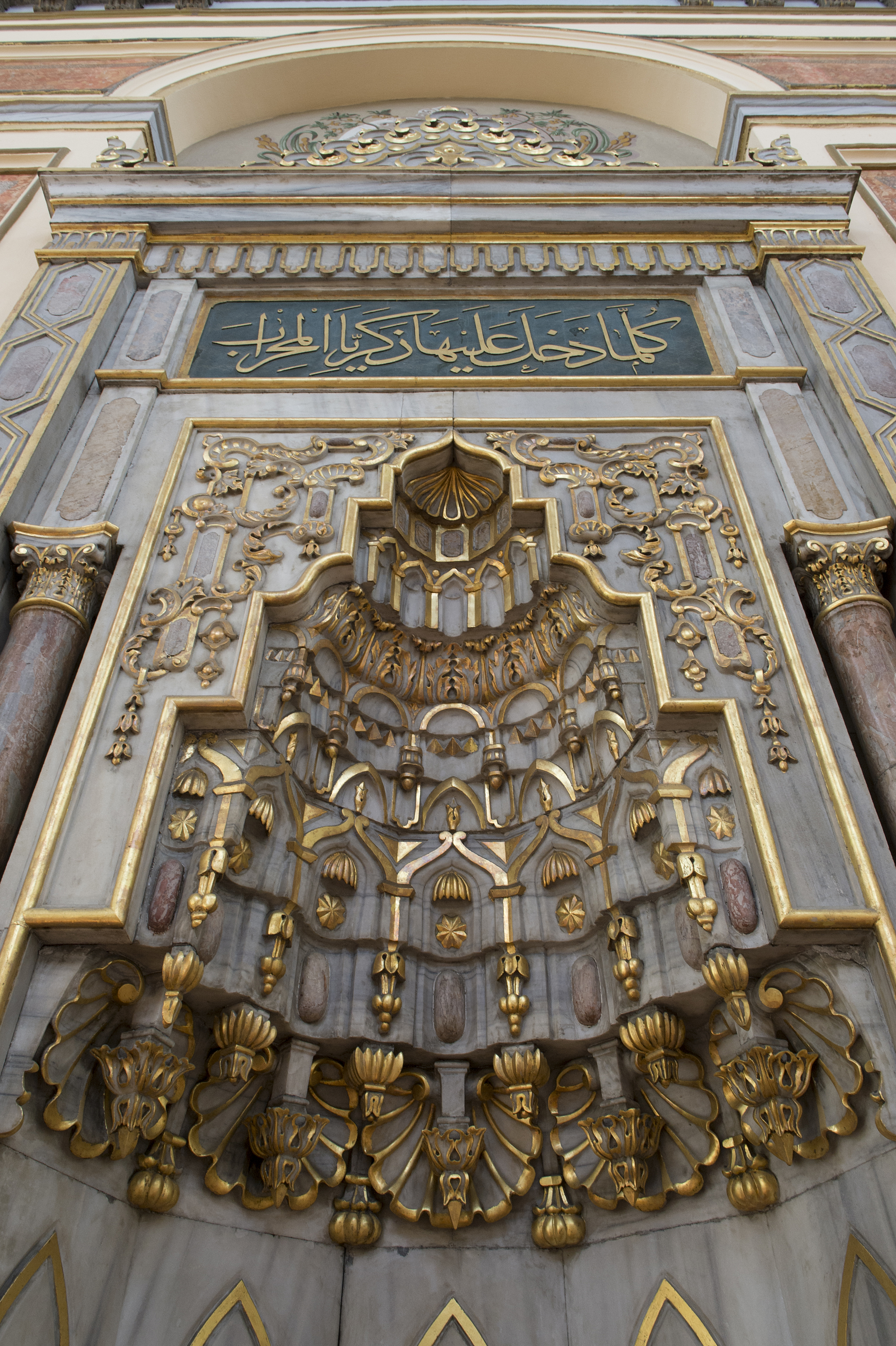
Dolmabahçe Mosque top of mihrab

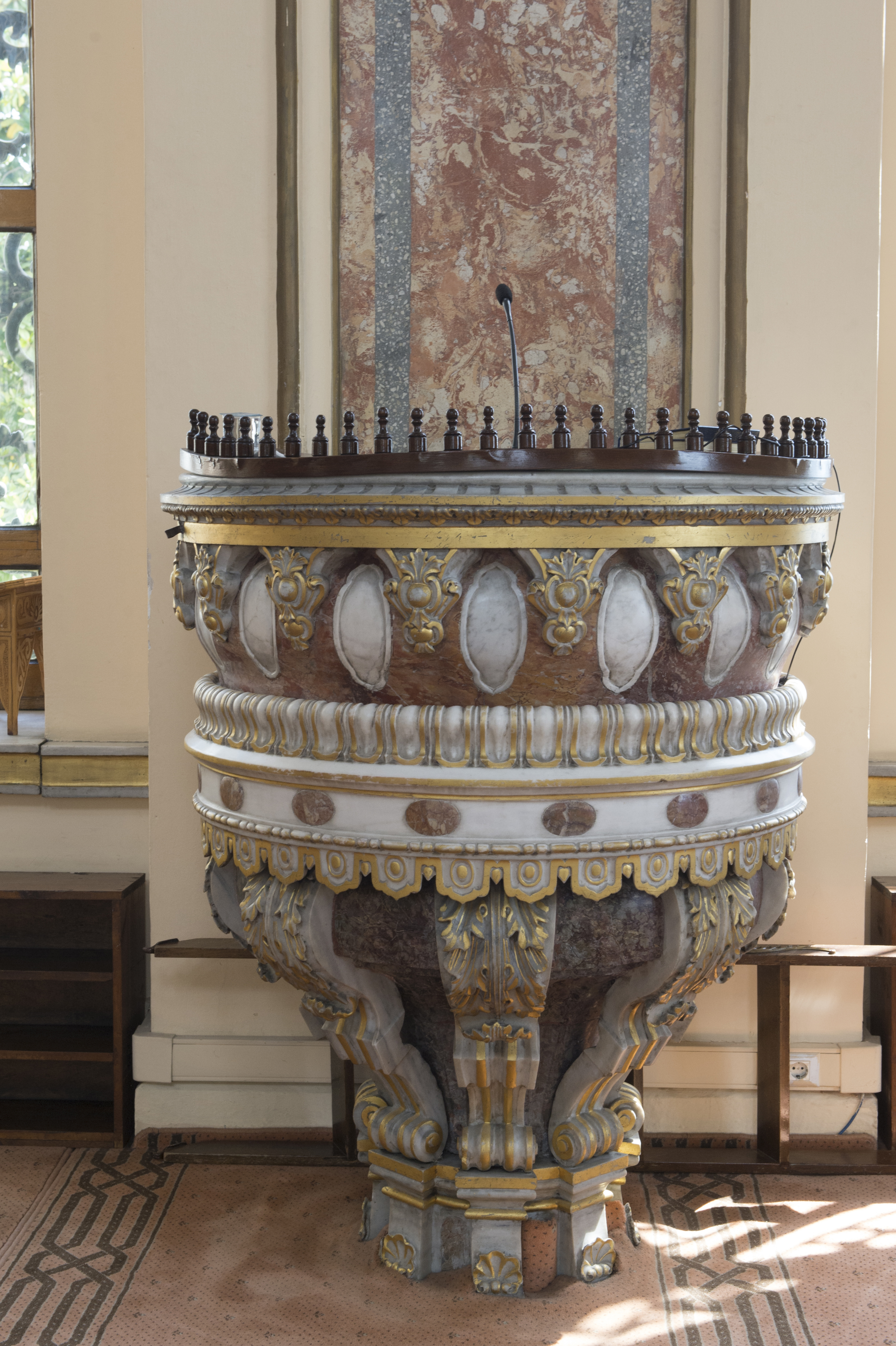
Dolmabahçe Mosque kürsü

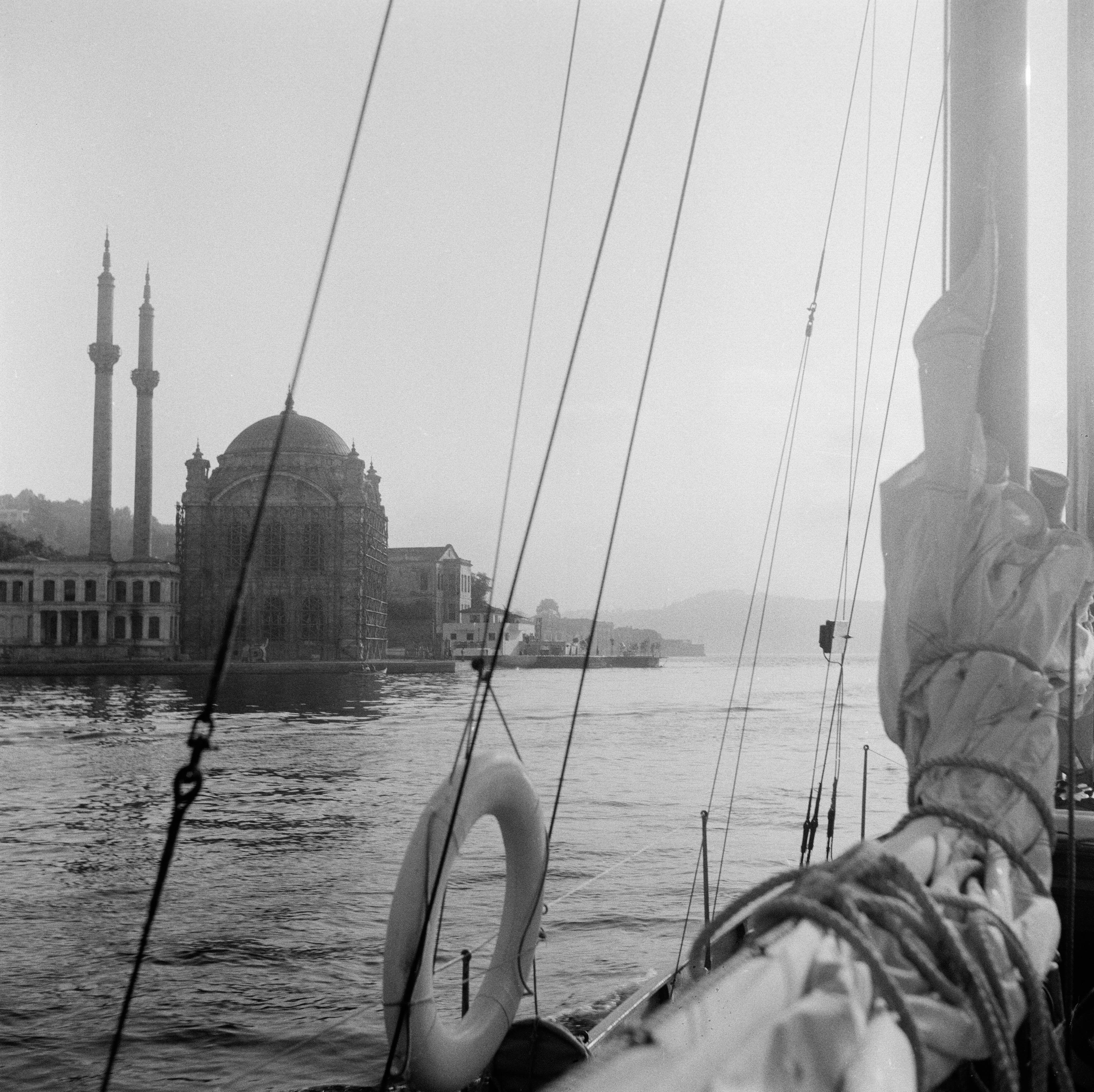
The Mosque in 1963. Picture taken from the sea by Mediterranean sea traveler and writer Göran Schildt.

== See also ==
- Dolmabahçe Clock Tower
- Ottoman architecture
- List of mosques
