= Naile Sultan (daughter of Abdulmejid I) =

Ottoman princess, daughter of Abdulmejid I and Şayeste Hanım

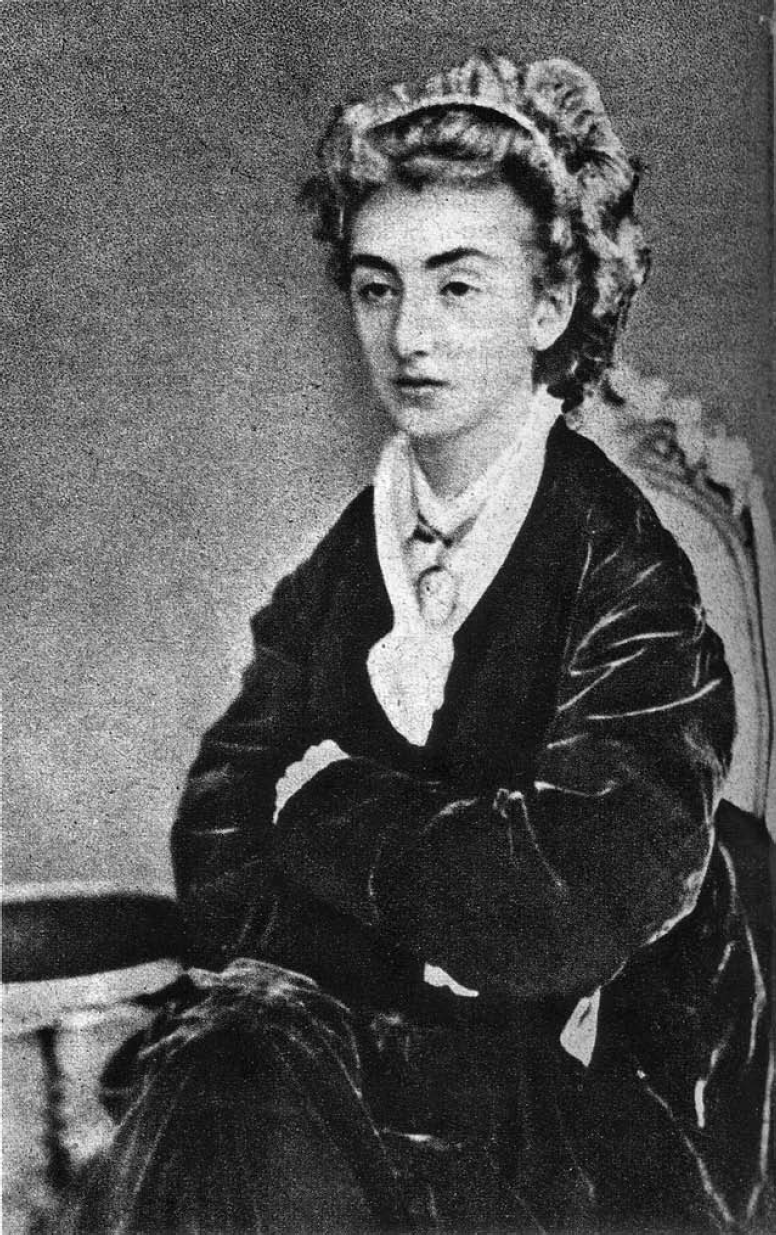
- Naile Sultan in 1880
- Born: 30 September 1856; Dolmabahçe Palace, Constantinople, Ottoman Empire
- Died: 18 January 1882 (aged 25); Constantinople, Ottoman Empire
- Burial: New Mosque, Istanbul
- Spouse: Kabaksal Çerkes Mehmed Pasha (m. 1876)
- Dynasty: Ottoman
- Father: Abdulmejid I
- Mother: Şayeste Hanım
- Religion: Sunni Islam

Naile Sultan (Ottoman Turkish: نائله سلطان; 30 September 1856 – 18 January 1882), also called Nadile Sultan, was an Ottoman princess, the daughter of Sultan Abdulmejid I and Şayeste Hanım. She was the half-sister of Sultans Murad V, Abdul Hamid II, Mehmed V, and Mehmed VI.

== Early life ==
Naile Sultan was born on 30 September 1856 in the Dolmabahçe Palace. Her father was Sultan Abdulmejid I, and her mother Şayeste Hanım, was from an Abkhazian princely family. She had a stillborn elder brother, Şehzade Abdüllah, and a younger adoptive brother, Mehmed VI. Naile lost her father when she was five.

== Marriage ==
Naile, like her half-sister Behice Sultan, was ill with tuberculosis from an early age and grew up very isolated. She was described as graceful, with a long, gaunt face, very delicate features, dark rimmed eyes, a thin neck and a sweet, sad smile.

In 1876, her mother arranged her marriage to Kabasakal Çerkes Mehmed Pasha, a relative of hers, brother of Bidar Kadın (consort of Abdülhamid II) and Shamil, 3rd Imam of Dagestan. He was described as a man simple and harsh. The marriage took place on 6 October 1876, during the reign of her brother, Abdul Hamid II. Although Sultan Abdulaziz had ordered her trousseaux, he was completely unable to arrange marriage for her. The couple were given a waterfront palace known as "Esma Sultan Mansion", located near the Ortaköy Mosque, as their residence. Their marriage was unhappy: Naile had been against marriage and found her husband unpleasant. They had no children.

== Death ==
Naile Sultan died on 18 January 1882 at the age of twenty five because of tuberculosis and unhappiness, and was buried in the mausoleum of new ladies in New Mosque. Her mother Şayeste Hanım donated a large inscription plate depicting Mecca and Medina to the tomb. After her death, Mehmed Pasha married first a foreign woman and later Esma Sultan, daughter of Sultan Abdulaziz and Gevheri Kadın. The two moved in Naile Sultan's palace in which Mehmed Pasha and Naile had previously lived. Her mother outlived her by thirty years, dying in 1912.

== See also ==
- List of Ottoman princesses

== Sources ==
- Brookes, Douglas Scott (2010). The Concubine, the Princess, and the Teacher: Voices from the Ottoman Harem. University of Texas Press. ISBN 978-0-292-78335-5.
- Sakaoğlu, Necdet (2008). Bu mülkün kadın sultanları: Vâlide sultanlar, hâtunlar, hasekiler, kadınefendiler, sultanefendiler. Oğlak Yayıncılık. ISBN 978-9-753-29623-6.
- Uluçay, Mustafa Çağatay (2011). Padişahların kadınları ve kızları. Ankara: Ötüken. ISBN 978-9-754-37840-5.
