= Gülistu Kadın =

Consort of Sultan Abdulmejid I

Gülistu
- Kadın
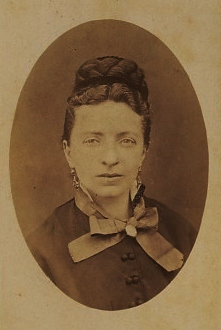
- Born: Princess Fatma Chachba; 1830
- Died: c. 1861 (aged 30–31); Eyüp Palace, Eyüp, Constantinople (now Istanbul), Ottoman Empire
- Burial: Gülistü Kadin Mausoleum, Fatih Mosque, Istanbul
- Consort: Abdulmejid I (m. 1855; died 1861)
- Issue: Zekiye Sultan; Fehime Sultan; Mediha Sultan; Mehmed VI
Names
- Turkish: Gülistü Kadin; Ottoman Turkish: کلستو خانم
- House: Chachba (by birth); Ottoman (by marriage)
- Father: Prince Tahir Bey Chachba
- Religion: Sunni Islam

Gülistü Kadin, called also Gülüstü Kadin, Gülistu Hanim or Gülüstu Hanim (Turkish pronunciation: [ɟylysˈty]; Ottoman Turkish: کلستو خانم; "garden rose"; born Princess Fatma Chachba; 1830 - c. 1861) was a consort of Sultan Abdulmejid I, and the mother of Sultan Mehmed VI, the last Sultan of the Ottoman Empire.

== Life ==
Born as Fatma Chachba, Gülistü Kadin was a member of an Abkhazian princely family. Her father was Prince Tahir Bey Chachba. She was a relative of Kelesh Ahmed-Bey Shervashidze, the head of state of the Principality of Abkhazia. She was described as a tall woman.

Gülistü married Abdulmejid in 1854, and was given the title of "Fourth Ikbal", and, in 1860, of "Fourth Kadın". On 26 February 1855, she give birth to twin daughters, Zekiye and Fehime Sultan. On 30 July 1856, she gave birth to her third child, a daughter, Mediha Sultan. Five years later on 14 January 1861, she gave birth to her fourth child, a son, Şehzade Mehmed Vahideddin (future Mehmed VI). She was the favorite daughter-in-law of Bezmiâlem Sultan.

== Death ==
She died in 1861, shortly after the birth of her last child. She was buried in her own mausoleum located in Fatih Mosque, Fatih, Istanbul.

After her death, her daughter Mediha Sultan was entrusted to the care of Verdicenan Kadın, and her son Mehmed was entrusted to the care of Şayeste Hanım.

Having died before her son ascended the throne, she was never Valide sultan.

== Issue ==
Name	Birth	Death	Notes
Zekiye Sultan	26 February 1855	19 February 1856	Twin sisters, buried in Tomb of Gülistü Kadin
Fehime Sultan	26 February 1855	10 November 1856	Twin sisters, buried in Tomb of Gülistü Kadin
Mediha Sultan	30 July 1856	7 November 1928	Married twice, and had issue, a son
Mehmed VI Vahideddin	14 January 1861	16 May 1926	36th and last Sultan of the Ottoman Empire

== In literature ==
- Gülistü is a character in Hıfzı Topuz's historical novel Abdülmecit: İmparatorluk Çökerken Sarayda 22 Yıl: Roman (2009).

== See also ==
- Ikbal (title)
- Ottoman Imperial Harem
- List of consorts of the Ottoman sultans

== Sources ==
- Uluçay, M. Çağatay (2011). Padişahların kadınları ve kızları. Ötüken. ISBN 978-9-754-37840-5.
- Açba, Leyla; Açba, Harun (2004). Bir Çerkes prensesinin harem hatıraları. L & M. ISBN 978-9-756-49131-7.
- Sakaoğlu, Necdet (2008). Bu Mülkün Kadın Sultanları: Vâlide Sultanlar, Hâtunlar, Hasekiler, Kandınefendiler, Sultanefendiler. Oğlak Yayıncılık. ISBN 978-6-051-71079-2.
- Kahya, Özge (2012). Sultan Abdülmecid'in kızı Mediha Sultan'ın hayatı (1856–1928).
- Brookes, Douglas Scott (2010). The Concubine, the Princess, and the Teacher: Voices from the Ottoman Harem. University of Texas Press. ISBN 978-0-292-78335-5.
- Paşa, Ahmed Cevdet (1960). Tezâkir. [2]. 13 - 20, Volume 2. Türk Tarih Kurumu Basımevi.
