= Münire Sultan (daughter of Abdulmejid I) =

Ottoman princess, Daughter of Abdulmejid I and Verdicenan Kadın

- Born: 9 December 1844; Topkapı Palace, Constantinople, Ottoman Empire
- Died: 29 June 1862 (aged 17); Findiklı Palace, Constantinople, Ottoman Empire
- Burial: Nakşidil Sultan Mausoleum, Fatih Mosque, Istanbul
- Spouse: Ibrahim Ilhami Pasha (m. 1857; died 1860) Ibrahim Pasha (m. 1861)
- Issue: Second marriage Sultanzade Alaeddin Bey
- Dynasty: Ottoman (by birth); Muhammad Ali (by marriage)
- Father: Abdulmejid I
- Mother: Verdicenan Kadın
- Religion: Sunni Islam

Münire Sultan (Ottoman Turkish: منیرہ سلطان; 9 December 1844 – 29 June 1862) was an Ottoman princess, daughter of Sultan Abdulmejid I and one of his consorts Verdicenan Kadın.

== Early life ==
Münire Sultan was born on 9 December 1844 at the Topkapı Palace. Her father was Sultan Abdulmejid I, and her mother was Verdicenan Kadın, the daughter of Prince Kaytuk Giorgi Achba and Princess Yelizaveta Hanım. She was the eldest child of her mother. She had a brother, Şehzade Ahmed Kemaleddin, three years younger than her, and an adoptive sister, Mediha Sultan.

Münire was educated at the palace, her early education consisted of religious education. Following her religious education, she acquired education in French, which became compulsory during the modernising Tanzimat reforms in the reign of her father. Pertaining to the modernisation, Münire was also given music education, which included both Eastern and Western music. She along with her half-sisters Behice Sultan and Refia Sultan were taught to play the piano from Therese Romano.

== First marriage ==
=== Engagement ===
In March 1854, a messenger from Istanbul announced the betrothal of Münire Sultan to Prince Ibrahim Ilhami Pasha, son of Abbas I of Egypt and his wife Mahivech Hanim. Large public celebrations were proclaimed and the viceroy was reported to be highly pleased with the news. Ibrahim Pasha sent her a solitaire ring, solitaire earrings and a briolette as her betrothal gifts. There were also all sorts of perfumes covered with transparent lids and bowls of musk and mastic. There were crystal carafes containing syrup and porcelain vases from Saxony holding all sorts of preserves, and finally there were both eastern and western candies on plates of Chinese porcelain. Her mother, Verdicenan Kadın gave some of these perfumes and morsels of food to other princesses, and also distributed them equally to the people in her entourage. The engagement took place in the Şemsipaşa Palace.

=== Wedding ===
The marriage took place on 17 May 1857 in at the Baltalimanı sahilhane, Istanbul. The wedding of her half-sister Cemile Sultan was also celebrated on the same day. The cost of the ceremony was bitterly criticized, because the Ottoman army had just suffered heavy defeats in Montenegro and Crete was in revolt. The marriage was consummated on 31 July 1857. The couple were given a palace located at Findiklı as their residence.

== Second marriage ==
Münire was widowed in 1860 when Prince Ibrahim İlhamy drowned as his boat capsized while crossing the Bosphorus, near Bebek Palace. On 2 January 1861, she married a namesake of her first husband, Damat Ferik Ibrahim Pasha, son of Serasker Rıza Pasha. The couple had a son named Sultanzade Alaeddin Bey, born on 16 December 1861.

== Death ==
Münire Sultan died at the age of seventeen at her palace located at Findiklı on 29 June 1862, and was buried in the mausoleum of Nakşidil Sultan, Fatih Mosque, Istanbul.

== Issue ==
Name	Birth	Death	Notes
By Damat Ibrahim Pasha (married 2 January 1861; 1828 – 1880)
Sultanzade Alaeddin Bey	16 December 1861	c. 1915	Unmarried and without issue

== See also ==
- List of Ottoman princesses
- Muhammad Ali Dynasty family tree

== Sources ==
- Uluçay, Mustafa Çağatay (2011). Padişahların kadınları ve kızları. Ankara: Ötüken. ISBN 978-9-754-37840-5.
