= Bezmiâlem Sultan =

Valide Sultan of the Ottoman Empire from 1839 to 1853

- Valide Sultan
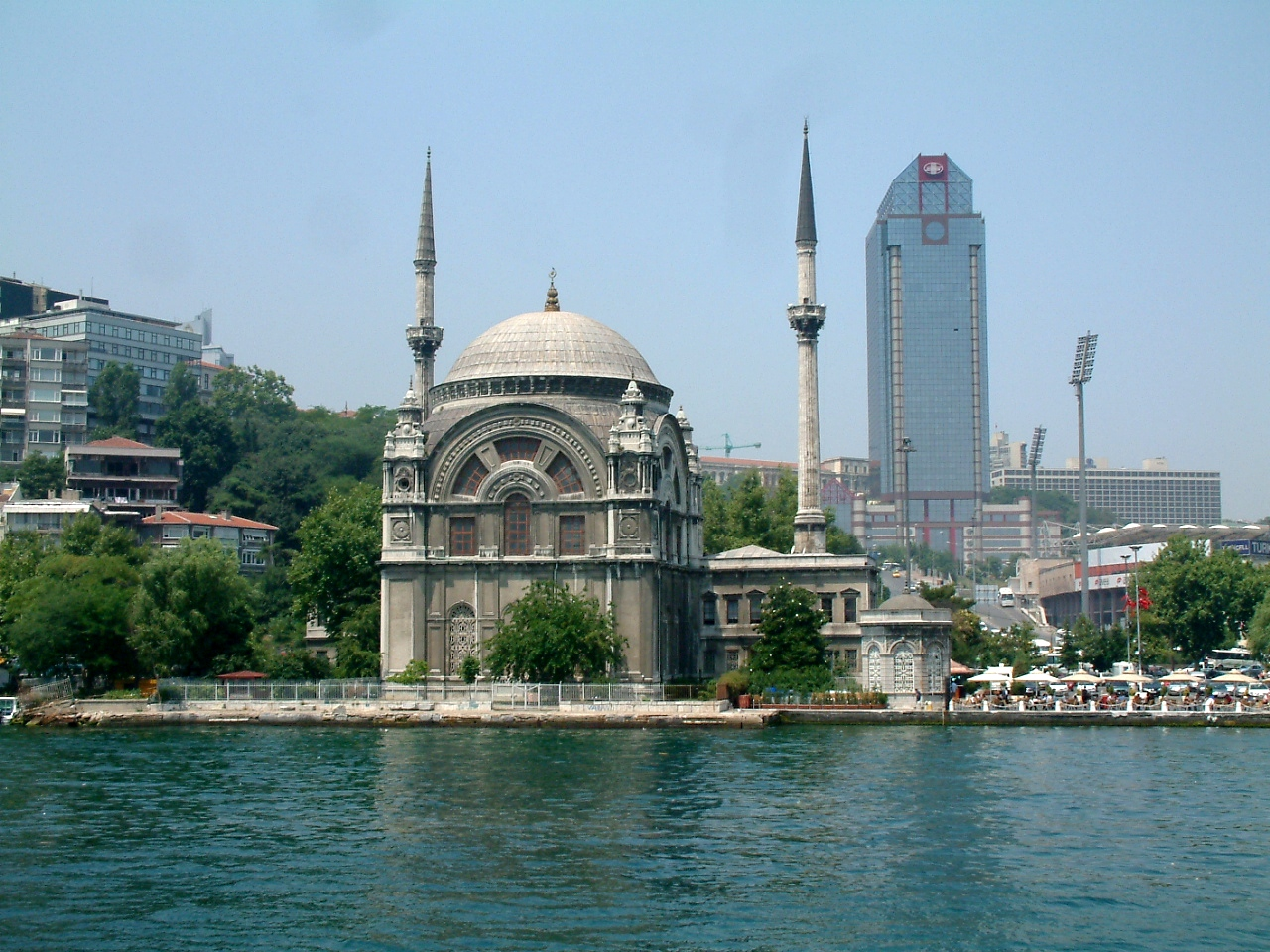
- Dolmabahçe Mosque (Bezmialem Valide Sultan Camii)

Valide Sultan of the Ottoman Empire
- Tenure: 2 July 1839 – 2 May 1853
- Predecessor: Nakşidil Sultan
- Successor: Pertevniyal Sultan
- Born: c. 1807; Georgia
- Died: 2 May 1853 (aged 45–46); Beşiktaş Palace, Constantinople, Ottoman Empire (present day Istanbul, Turkey)
- Burial: Mahmud II Mausoleum, Çemberlitaş, Fatih, Istanbul
- Spouse: Mahmud II (m. 1822; died 1839)
- Issue: Abdülmecid I
Names
- Turkish: Bezmiâlem Sultan; Ottoman Turkish: بزم عالم سلطان
- House: Ottoman (by marriage)
- Religion: Sunni Islam

Bezmiâlem Sultan (also spelled Bazimialam, Ottoman Turkish: بزم عالم سلطان, romanized: Bezm-i ʿĀlem Sulṭān; c. 1807 – 2 May 1853), was a consort of Sultan Mahmud II, and Valide sultan to their son, Sultan Abdülmecid I of the Ottoman Empire.

== Early years ==
Bezmiâlem Kadın, called also Bazimialam, was born in 1807 in Georgia. She had been educated by Esma Sultan, a half-sister of Mahmud II and her favorite advisor, and was said to have been buxom and a bath attendant before entering the imperial harem. She had a beautiful face and extraordinary white and beautiful hands. She was considered very intelligent, although not formally educated. She became a consort of Sultan Mahmud in 1822, and was given the title of "Third Kadın" and, in 1832, "Second Kadın". On 25 April 1823, she gave birth to her only son, Şehzade Abdulmecid, later Abdulmecid I.

== As Valide Sultan ==
=== Early years ===
Bezmiâlem became Valide Sultan, after Abdulmecid I ascended to the throne in 1839. One source says that Mahmud died of alcoholism, rather than tuberculosis, and she is reported to have convinced Abdulmecid to destroy his father's wine cellars. Since her son was only sixteen, Bezmialem, who Abdulmecid loved very much, although not a regent, assisted him in the administration of the state.

She was thirty-one and was still young enough to despise and mistrust the elder non-statesman who had made himself minister. She was known for her extremely pale complexion and her reddish blonde hair. She was slender, with very good-looking fingers. She was very pale, and looked very young when she became the Valide Sultan. She advised her son to allow Koca Hüsrev Mehmed Pasha to incur the odium of seeking terms from Muhammad Ali of Egypt but urged him to resist the Grand Vizier's attempts to advance his nominees to important offices of the state. Abdulmecid duly played for time, awaiting Mustafa Reşid Pasha's return from England before taking any major decisions on policy. She gave sound counsel. So shrewd was her judgement of men and their motives that she continued to influence the choice of ministers until shortly before her death fourteen years later. She also recommended Reşid to Abdulmecid because she believed he understood what Mahmud had been seeking to achieve in his reform programme. She influenced the appointments of her son's ministers, inviting him to be wary of old but inexperienced men who sought his favor. A great supporter of her son's reforms and admirer of Europe, her shrewd and objective judgment was held in high esteem by the sultan, who consulted her regularly until her death.

In 1842 Abdülmecid ordered new apartments for his mother on Yıldız Palace. Furnished and decorated in the French style, which was all the rage at the time in the Ottoman Empire, they took the name of Pavilion Kasr-i Dilküşa (Pavilion of the happy heart) and were only completed after Bazimialam's death. . Charles White reported in 1844 that the revenues of Bezmiâlem came partly as an annuity from the civil list, and partly from real property, "the fruits of gifts and accumulation". He estimated her entirely yearly income at 100,000 British pounds.

Bezmiâlem was a lady of deep religious conviction, and benevolent nature. She belonged to the Naqshbandi, a major Sunni spiritual order of Sufism. She was a believer, and follower of the Indian Muhammad Jan (died 1850). Muhammad Jan was active as of the 1830s and succeeded in gaining many followers in Istanbul. She also taught the orthodox principles of the Naqshbandi to Abdulmecid.

Like Valide Sultan, she favored Georgian Circassians like herself in choosing consorts for her son.

Bezmiâlem earned a reputation as an intelligent, amiable and charitable woman, and she was among the most loved and respected Valid Sultans in history. Additionally, some ambassadors referred to her as the most influential Valide Sultan in centuries.

=== Influence over Abdulmecid ===
A considerable influence was exercised over Abdülmecid by Bezmiâlem. Both her dominant position in the harem and her special position with regard to her son are shown by the letters which she wrote to him when he was on a trip in Anatolia in 1850. She tells how his family watched him leave. She often wrote letters to his son, whose poor grammar revealed her humble origins and poor formal education, to which he answered in person rather than through intermediaries. Bezmiâlem's personal seal read: Devletlü, ifetlü Valide Sultan-ı âlişan Hazretleri (His Excellency, His Majesty the chaste and honored Valide Sultan), while a second, more elaborate one read: Muhabbetten Muhammed oldu hâsılhammed Muhabbetten oldu hâsılhammed Muhabbetten old Hâmâmâmuza. When Abdülmecid left Istanbul he left the management of the capital to his mother.

At other times that the kadıns, were all asking for him; that she had herself taken the children to the bath; that every one prayed for him. She wanted news of his health. She had passed out the cloth he had sent to the kadıns, and to his sisters and brother. She wrote of the birth of twin sons to one of his ikbals, and finally letters of joy telling of the preparations for his return.

=== Patroness of architecture ===
Like other influential Ottoman women, Bezmiâlem was a patron of arts and architecture. In 1845, she commissioned a wooden bridge at the Golden Horn, known as the Cisr-i Cedid (New Bridge), and Valide Bridge. The same year, she commissioned the "Gurebâ-yi Müslimîn" hospital, fountain, and a mosque in Yenibahçe. She also built another "Gurebâ-yi Müslimîn" hospital in Mecca.

Bezmiâlem commissioned Çeşmes (fountains) throughout Istanbul. The first was built in Beşiktaş-Maçka in 1839, just after Abdulmecid ascended the throne. The second was built in 1841 in the Uzunyusuf neighborhood of Silivrikapı. The third known as the "Ülçer Fountain" was built in the Ülçer neighborhood of Sultanahmet in 1843. The same year she built another fountain in Topkapı. In 1846, another fountain was built in the Cihannüma neighbourhood of Beşiktaş. In 1852–3, another fountain was built in Tarabya. Two another were built in Alibeyköyü, and near the Galata Tower known as the "Bereketzade Fountain".

She also repaired the fountain of Abdullah Agha in Silivrikapı in 1841, another fountain in Kasımpaşa also in 1841, and Mehmed the Conqueror's fountain in Topkapı in 1851. She also commissioned three Sebils. Two in Medina; one on the road to the grave of Hamza ibn Abdul-Muttalib, and another in 1851 near to the above-mentioned one, outside the Damascus Gate, in the vicinity of the so-called Sebil Bahçesi. A third was built in the courtyard of the shrine of Husayn ibn Ali in Karbala.

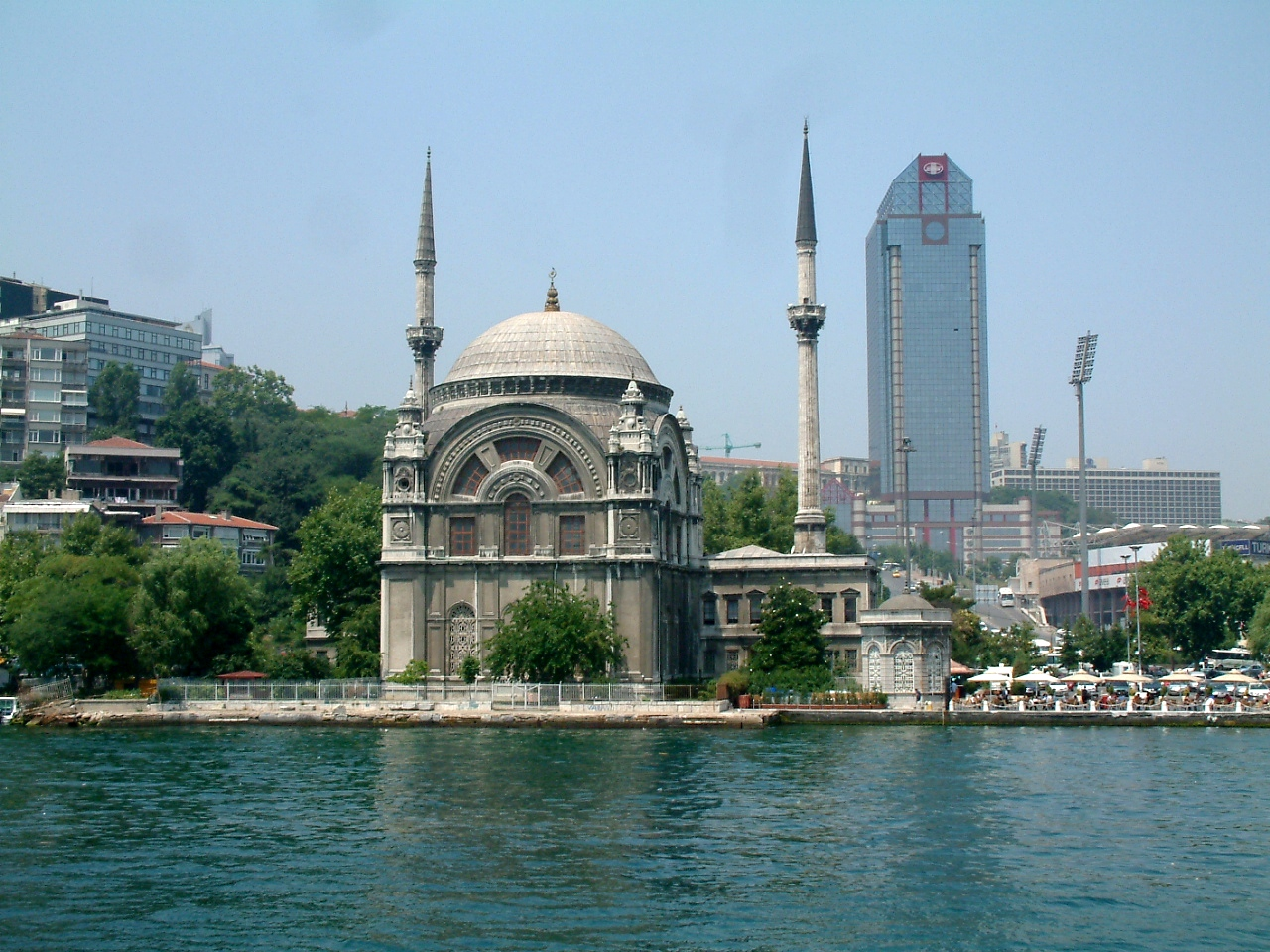
Dolmabahçe Mosque of Bezmiâlem Sultan.

In 1850, Bezmiâlem founded the Dârülmaârif (Valide School), near the mausoleum of her consort, Sultan Mahmud. It was an institution that prepared civil servants for both government offices, and the demand for Dârülfünun. She also established a lithography printer in this school and donated 546 volumes of valuable writing books to its library by French authors, including Hugo, Lamartine, Baudelaire and Flaubert. Since 1933, the Istanbul Girls High School continues its education in this school. A primary school was also opened near it. She also founded another school in Beykoz, and another primary school in 1841 in the Akşı neighborhood of Edirnekapı Molla.

Bezmiâlem also founded the Dolmabahçe Mosque near the Dolmabahçe Palace. Garabed Balyan, and his son Nigoğayos Balyan designed the mosque. The mosque consists of a small though lofty dome prayer hall that is preceded by an extensive, truly palatial looking pavilion. The architecture is Neoclassical through and through, with the two minarets designed as Corinthian columns up to their balconies. The construction of the mosque began before her death was completed after her death.

== Death ==
Bezmiâlem Sultan died in the Beşiktaş Palace on 2 May 1853, of Tuberculosis then raging in Istanbul and was buried in the mausoleum of her husband Sultan Mahmud II located on the Divanyolu Street, Istanbul.

Her son Abdülmecid honored her with a magnificent funeral, costing 79,000 kuruş, a fortune, and well described by Sir Adolphus Slade in his Turkey and the Crimean War: A Narrative of Historical Events (1867):

Female screams at dawn in the palace of Beshik-tash, one morning in early May, announced her mourning [of Abdülmecid I] to the passing guards and caiks, and greeted the body which at that early hour was being transported to the caik empire, followed by other caiks with the retinue of the late lady [Bezmialem], to the old menagerie. He was there washed and perfumed according to custom, and lying on a coffin covered with clothing of gold and silver. Preceded by censers and choristers, he was then brought out from inside the palace and placed in the shade of the trees in the central courtyard for a few minutes, while the court imam recited a prayer for the souls of the dead. During his recital, the spectators, taking off their slippers, remained standing on their soles upside down:

The procession was then formed. Military pashas on horseback, in single file, flanked by their grooms and tchiaushe on foot, led the way, followed by a compact body of Arab dervishes singing vigorously. Then three legal dignitaries rode, also in single file, the cazi-inquirers of Europe and Asia with the evcaf nazir. A body of Khamedes (royal servants) marched later in order. Then the ministers of state rode in single file; the last three are the Captain Pasha, the Scheick ul Islam and the Grand Vizier. After them rode a body of the Sultan's eunuchs, the leader of which, the kislar agasi, a melancholy-looking Nubian elder, immediately preceded the body. The eunuchs of the deceased, scattering newly minted silver coins among the crowd, closed the procession. As the procession passed through the streets, flanked at intervals by troops, numerous spectators in the open spaces sobbed loudly; and although oriental women always have tears and smiles on command, those shed on this occasion were sincere, since sex had lost a lawyer that day, the poor friend.

The procession stopped in front of the garden of Mahmoudieh's mausoleum, where, on an elevated slope, the children of the adjacent schools lined up, chanting hymns, and, reforming on foot, proceeded through gilded gates and rose gardens, slowly towards the tomb. When its portals opened, the women of the valeh gathered inside the building to pay the final tribute of respect to their gracious mistress uttered, sad and plaintive; mingle, strangely harmonious, with the songs of the dervishes and the neighing of the driven horses. The body was buried next to that of Sultan Mahmoud II.

== Issue ==
Together with Mahmud, Bezmiâlem had one son:

- Abdulmecid I (25 April 1823 – 25 June 1861, buried in Yavuz Selim Mosque, Fatih). 31st Sultan of the Ottoman Empire.

== See also ==
- Ottoman dynasty
- Ottoman family tree
- List of consorts of the Ottoman Sultans

== Sources ==
- Uluçay, M. Çağatay (2011). Padişahların kadınları ve kızları. Ötüken. ISBN 978-9-754-37840-5.
- Sakaoğlu, Necdet (2008). Bu Mülkün Kadın Sultanları: Vâlide Sultanlar, Hâtunlar, Hasekiler, Kandınefendiler, Sultanefendiler. Oğlak Yayıncılık. ISBN 978-6-051-71079-2.
- Davis, Fanny (1986). The Ottoman Lady: A Social History from 1718 to 1918. Greenwood Publishing Group. ISBN 978-0-313-24811-5.

Ottoman royalty
Preceded by Nakşidil Sultan	Valide Sultan; 2 July 1839 – 2 May 1853	Succeeded by Pertevniyal Sultan
