= Şehzade Mehmed Burhaneddin (son of Abdul Hamid II) =

Ottoman prince, son of Abdul Hamid II (1885–1949)

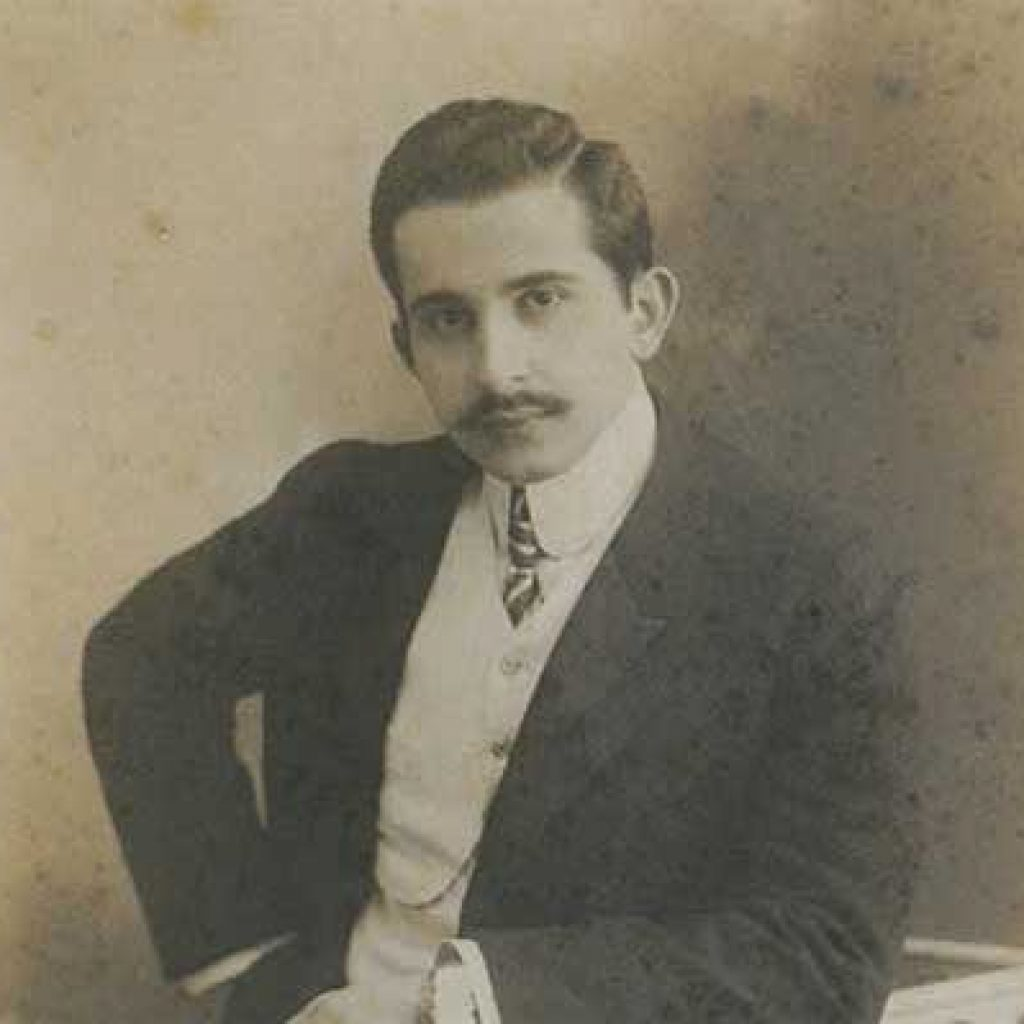
- Born: 19 December 1885; Yıldız Palace, Constantinople, Ottoman Empire (now Istanbul, Turkey)
- Died: 15 June 1949 (aged 63); New York City, New York, U.S
- Burial: Cemetery of the Sulaymaniyya Takiyya, Damascus, Syria
- Spouse: Hidayet Hanım (m. 1908, divorced) Nazlıyar Hanım (m. 1909; div. 1919) Georgina Leonora Mosselmans (m. 1925; div. 1925) Elsie Deming Jackson (m. 1933)
- Issue: Şehzade Mehmed Fahreddin; Şehzade Ertuğrul Osman
Names
- Turkish: Şehzade Mehmed Burhaneddin; Ottoman Turkish: شهزاده محمد برهان الدين
- Dynasty: Ottoman
- Father: Abdul Hamid II
- Mother: Mezidemestan Kadın
- Religion: Sunni Islam
- Military career
- Allegiance: Ottoman Empire
- Branch: Ottoman Navy
- Service years: 1890–1922 (active service)
- Rank: See list

Şehzade Mehmed Burhaneddin Efendi (Ottoman Turkish: شهزاده محمد برهان الدين; 19 December 1885 – 15 June 1949) was an Ottoman prince, son of Sultan Abdul Hamid II and Mezidemestan Kadın.

== Early life ==
Şehzade Mehmed Burhaneddin was born on 19 December 1885 in the Yıldız Palace. His father was Sultan Abdul Hamid II and his mother was Mezidemestan Kadın, daughter of Kaymat Mikanba. He was the only child of his mother. Abdul Hamid named him in the memory of his deceased half-brother, Şehzade Mehmed Burhaneddin. Burhaneddin's circumcision took place in 1891, together with his half-brothers, Şehzade Mehmed Abdülkadir, and Şehzade Ahmed Nuri.

== Career ==
In June 1890, aged four, Burhaneddin was enlisted in the navy by his father. He was assigned the Ottoman ironclad Orhaniye. In salutations processions, he and Şehzade Ibrahim Tevfik saluted in navy uniforms in front of naval regiment. On 18 June 1893, aged seven, he was given the rank of lieutenant commander. The same year, he composed the naval anthem. On 6 February 1916, during World War I, he was given the rank of lieutenant commander. On 29 July 1918, he was promoted to the rank of captain.

In 1903 during the visit of Kaiser Wilhelm II's sons Wilhelm, German Crown Prince and Prince Eitel Friedrich of Prussia, Abdul Hamid appointed Burhaneddin and minister of foreign affairs Tevfik Pasha to welcome the princes. Burhaneddin welcomed the princes and Tevfik served as translator during the visit. In October 1915, he visited Vienna, and stayed there in Bristol Hotel until the end of 1921.

== Personal life ==
Besides formal education, Burhaneddin was taught music and arts. He played the violoncello. For a while he was the favorite son of Abdülhamid II, so much so that it was thought the Sultan could circumvent the law and make him crown prince. He had been allocated a villa on the grounds of the Yıldız Palace. He also owned a mansion in Yeniköy.

His first wife was Emine Nurbanu Hidayet Hanım. She was born in 1891. Her father was Prince Mehmed Refik Bey Achba, and her mother was Princess Mahşeref Hanım Emkhaa. A member of the princely Abkhaz family of the Achba, she was related to Esma Cavidan Hanim, consort of Şehzade Yusuf Izzeddin, to Leyla Gülefşan Hanim, lady of the court, Saliha Verdicenan Kadın, consort of Sultan Abdülmejid I, father of Abdülhamid II, and to Pesend Hanim, consort of Abdülhamid II himself. They married on 15 July 1907 in the Yıldız Palace. Soon after the marriage she suffered an abortion. On 26 November 1911, she gave birth to her only child, a son, Şehzade Mehmed Fahreddin in the Nişantaşı Palace. Later divorced, Hidayet died in 1946 in Sivas.

His second wife was Aliye Melek Nazlıyar Hanım. Of Circassian origin, she was born on 13 October 1892 in Istanbul. They married on 7 June 1909 in the Nişantaşı Palace. She was the mother of Ertuğrul Osman born on 18 August 1912, and who served as the Head of House of Osman from 1994 until his death in 2009. They divorced in 1919, after which Nazlıyar married Mehmet Cavit Bey, a finance minister of the Unionists. He was the father of Poet Yalçın. He was executed in 1926, due to his involvement in the İzmir Assassination, which was a failed assassination attempt against Mustafa Kemal Atatürk, 1st President of Turkey. Nazlıyar died on 31 August 1976 in Ankara, Turkey.

His third wife was Georgina Leonora Mosselmans, a Dutch lady. She was born on 23 August 1900 in Bergen op Zoom, Netherlands. They married on 29 April 1925 in Paris, France. The marriage was not recognized by Caliph Abdülmejid II and was annulled the same year. Georgina died in 1969. His fourth and last wife was Elsie Deming Jackson, a wealthy American widow. She was born on 6 September 1879 in New York, and was six years his senior. They married on 3 July 1933 in New York. The marriage was not recognized by Caliph Abdülmejid II. Elsie died at the age of seventy two on 12 May 1952 in New York.

== Later life and death ==
On 27 April 1909, Abdul Hamid was deposed, and sent into exile in Thessaloniki. After Thessaloniki fell to Greece in 1912, Abdul Hamid also returned to Istanbul, and settled in the Beylerbeyi Palace, where he died in 1918. After Abdul Hamid's deposition, he formed close relations from the Unionists that could protect him from the enemy. In 1914, he was offered the Albanian throne by the Senate of Central Albania, but he turned down the offer. In 1921, he was also offered the throne of Iraq, but the British opposed this decision. Burhaneddin and his family then settled in Switzerland.

At the exile of imperial family in March 1924, Burhaneddin and his family were already abroad. They settled in Nice and then in Paris. In 1930, Burhaneddin moved to New York. There, as the member of a large oil company, he received salary of $2000 per month. Unlike his siblings, he didn't suffer financial difficulties and poverty. In New York, he lived on the Fifth Avenue, New York's richest neighbourhood.

Mehmed Burhaneddin died on 15 June 1949, due to heart attack at the age of sixty three, in New York. His body was brought to Istanbul, but the government didn't allow him and his family to enter, after which his body was taken to Syria, where he was buried in the cemetery of the Sulaymaniyya Takiyya, Damascus.

== Honours ==
Styles of Şehzade Mehmed Burhaneddin
- Reference style: His Imperial Highness
- Spoken style: Your Imperial Highness

Ottoman honours

- Order of the House of Osman
- Order of Glory, Jeweled
- Order of Distinction, Jeweled
- Order of Osmanieh, Jeweled
- Order of Medjidie, Jeweled
- Imtiyaz Medal in Silver; in Gold
- Liakat Medal in Gold
- Hicaz Demiryolu Medal in Gold
- Iftikhar Sanayi Medal in Gold
- Greek War Medal in Gold

=== Military appointments ===
==== Military ranks and naval appointments ====
- 18 June 1893: Lieutenant Commander, Ottoman Navy
- 6 February 1916: Commander, Ottoman Navy
- 29 July 1918: Captain, Ottoman Navy

== Issue ==
Name	Birth	Death	Notes
By Hidayet Hanım (married 1908 – divorced; 1891 – 1946)
Şehzade Mehmed Fahreddin	26 November 1911	13 July 1968	born in Nişantaşı Palace; married in Paris on 31 August 1933 to Greek Catherine Papadopoulos (Paris, 20 May 1914 – Athens, 15 June 1945), without issue; died in exile in New York City, and buried there
By Nazlıyar Hanım (married 7 June 1909 – divorced 1919; 13 October 1892 – 31 August 1976)
Şehzade Ertuğrul Osman	18 August 1912	23 September 2009	born in Nişantaşı Palace; married twice without issue; died in Istanbul, Turkey. 43rd Head of Imperial House of Osman.

== In popular culture ==
- In the 2017 TV series Payitaht: Abdülhamid, Şehzade Mehmed Burhaneddin is portrayed by Turkish actor Ulaşcan Kutlu.

== Sources ==
- Korkmaz, Mehmet (30 December 2019). "Denizin Saraylıları: Bahriye'de Osmanlı Şehzadeleri". Hazine-i Evrak Arşiv ve Tarih Araştırmaları Dergisi (in Turkish). 1 (1): 42–65.
