= Fevziye Sultan =

Ottoman princess, daughter of Şehzade Ibrahim Tevfik and Hayriye Hanım

- Born: 28 October 1928; Paris, France
- Died: 9 April 2014 (aged 85); Paris, France
- Burial: Muslim Cemetery in Thais, Val-de-Marne, France
- Spouse: Muhammad Hussein Khayri Bey
Names
- Turkish: Fevziye Osmanoğlu Sultan; Ottoman Turkish: فوضیه سلطان
- Father: Şehzade Ibrahim Tevfik
- Mother: Hayriye Hanım
- Religion: Sunni Islam

Fevziye Sultan (Ottoman Turkish: فوزیه سلطان; 28 October 1928 – 9 April 2014), called also Fevziye Osmanoğlu, was an Ottoman princess, the daughter of Şehzade Ibrahim Tevfik and Hayriye Hanım.

== Biography ==
Fevziye Sultan was born on 28 October 1928 in Paris, France. Her father was Şehzade Ibrahim Tevfik, son of Şehzade Mehmed Burhaneddin and Mestinaz Hanım and grandson of Ottoman Sultan Abdülmejid I, and her mother was his last consort Hayriye Hanım, a Bosnian. She was the last child of her father and the only one of her mother. Having been born after the exile of the dynasty, she never carried the title of Sultana by full right. Fevziye and her family then went to live outside Nice in a village up in the hills. They then settled with Şehzade Ömer Faruk and Sabiha Sultan. In 1930, her mother entrusted her to them, and went to live with another relative.

After her father's death in 1931, her mother came back to Nice, took her, and went first to Paris and then to Egypt, where she married a Tatar by the name of Seyfulin Bey, who brought up Fevziye as if she were his own daughter. Fevziye lived for some time with Princess Wijdan, wife of Prince Ibrahim Hilmi, son of Khedive Isma'il Pasha of Egypt. The princess's husband had died in 1927, and left her with a substantial fortune. Princess Wijdan wanted to raise the young Fevziye as her own and find her a suitable husband, but when she lost all her money gambling she was obliged to send her back to her mother.

In 1949 or 1951, Fevziye married the Air Force officer Muhammad Hussein Khayri Bey, the son of Kadria Hussein, an Egyptian princess and Mahmud Khayri Pasha. Khayri Bey was later accused of taking part in the 1956 plot to overthrow President Gamal Abdel Nasser, arrested, and never seen again.

She studied journalism and sociology at Sorbonne University, and received a degree in spontaneous translation in English and French from the same university. In 1962, Fevziye began working for UNESCO. She worked as an educational planner for seven years and as a communications specialist for another seven years. Later, she was assigned to the culture department of the organization. From 1978, she was engaged in the restoration of antiquities. She also worked on an international program on the restoration of Byzantine monuments in Istanbul.

She died at the age of eighty-five on 9 April 2014 in Paris, France. Her funeral was held in the Grande Mosquée de Paris and was attended by her relatives in France and Switzerland, along with Turkey's Parist Embassy Undersecretary Ali Onaner. She was buried in Muslim Cemetery in Thais, Val-de-Marne, France.

== Sources ==
- Bardakçı, Murat (2017). Neslishah: The Last Ottoman Princess. Oxford University Press. ISBN 978-9-774-16837-6.
