= Şehzade Ertuğrul Osman =

Head of the Imperial House of Osman (1912–2009)

Ertuğrul Osman

Head of the Osmanoğlu family
- Term: 12 March 1994 – 23 September 2009
- Predecessor: Şehzade Mehmed Orhan
- Successor: Şehzade Bayezid Osman
- Born: 18 August 1912; Nişantaşı Palace, Istanbul, Ottoman Empire
- Died: 23 September 2009 (aged 97); Istanbul, Turkey
- Spouse: Gulda Twerskoy (m. 1947; died 1985) Zeynep Tarzi (m. 1991)
- House: Osmanoğlu
- Father: Şehzade Mehmed Burhaneddin
- Mother: Aliye Melek Nazlıyar Hanım

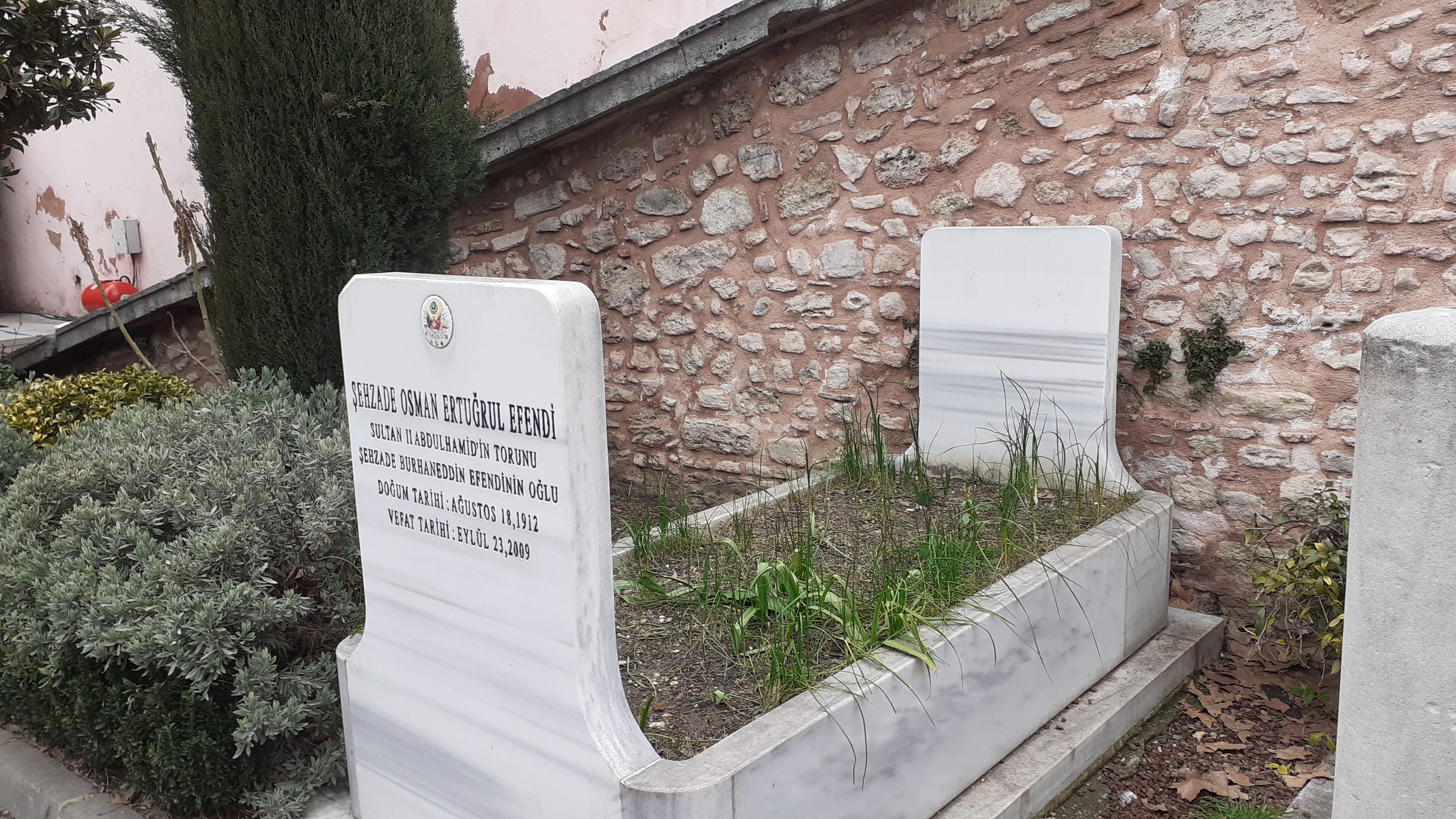
Ertuğrul Osman's grave in the burial ground of the Tomb of Sultan Mahmud II in Çemberlitaş, Istanbul.

Şehzade Ertuğrul Osman Efendi (Ottoman Turkish: ارطغرل عثمان; 18 August 1912 – 23 September 2009), also known as Osman Ertuğrul Osmanoğlu with a surname as required by the Turkish Republic, was a prince of the Ottoman Empire and the 43rd Head of the Imperial House of Osman from 1994 until his death.

Until the abolition of the monarchy on 1 November 1922, Osman was addressed as His Imperial Highness Şehzade Ertuğrul Osman Efendi Hazretleri, Imperial Prince of the Ottoman Empire. He is known in Turkey as "the last Ottoman".

== Biography ==
Şehzade Ertuğrul Osman was born on 18 August 1912 in Istanbul, in Nişantaşı Palace. He was the second and youngest son of Şehzade Mehmed Burhaneddin (Yıldız Palace, 19 December 1885 – New York City, United States, 15 June 1949, and buried in Damascus). His father served as a Captain of the Ottoman Army. Ertuğrul Osman's mother was Burhaneddin's second consort, Aliye Melek Nazlıyar Hanım (Adapazarı, 13 October 1892 – Ankara, 31 August 1976), daughter of Hüseyin Bey. They married at Nişantaşı, Nişantaşı Palace, Pera (today Beyoğlu) on 7 June 1909 and divorced in 1919. Osman's paternal grandparents were Sultan Abdul Hamid II and Mezidemestan Kadın.

In 1924, while studying in Vienna, Austria, he received news that all members of the Sultan's family were to be exiled. He moved to the United States in 1933 and later resided in New York City. He was educated at Sciences Po Paris. He worked as a consultant for Canadian company Wells Overseas which often sent him to South America.

Osman lived modestly in Manhattan after 1945, residing in a two-bedroom apartment above a restaurant. He returned to Turkey in 1992, having been invited by the country's government. At that time, he observed, "Democracy works well in Turkey." He became the 43rd Head of the Imperial House of Osman in 1994, after the death of Şehzade Mehmed Orhan.

Osman was granted a Turkish passport and citizenship in 2004. He spoke Turkish, English, German and French fluently and understood Italian and Spanish.

Osman died on 23 September 2009 in his sleep from kidney failure, at the age of 97. He had spent a week in Istanbul's Memorial hospital at the time of his death. Osman's funeral was held at the Sultan Ahmed Mosque in Istanbul on 26 September. His body was interred in the burial ground next to his grandfather Sultan Abdul Hamid II's tomb in Istanbul's Çemberlitaş neighborhood. His coffin was draped with the Imperial Ottoman Standard and his funeral was attended by Turkish government ministers. Prime Minister of Turkey Recep Tayyip Erdoğan and President Abdullah Gül both sent condolences to the Imperial family. Erdoğan also later visited Osman's widow at a former Imperial Palace to express his condolences. He was the last head of the House of Osman to be born in the Ottoman Empire.

== Marriages ==
He was married twice, first in New York City on 20 January 1947 to Gulda Twerskoy (Johannesburg, South Africa, 20 March 1915 – New York City, 16 September 1985), without issue. His second wife, whom he married on a football pitch, on 27 September 1991, also without issue, Zeynep Tarzi (born 16 December 1940 in Istanbul), is the daughter of Abdulfettah Tarzi, nephew-in-law of King Amanullah Khan of Afghanistan, and of Pakize Tarzi, a pioneering Turkish gynaecologist from a deep-rooted Ottoman family. He remained married to Zeynep until his death.

Şehzade Ertuğrul Osman House of Osman Born: 18 August 1912 Died: 23 September 2009
Preceded by Mehmed Orhan	Head of the Osmanoğlu family 12 March 1994 – 23 September 2009	Succeeded by Bayezid Osman
