= Emsalinur Kadın =

Seventh consort of Ottoman Sultan Abdul Hamid II (c.1866–c.1950)

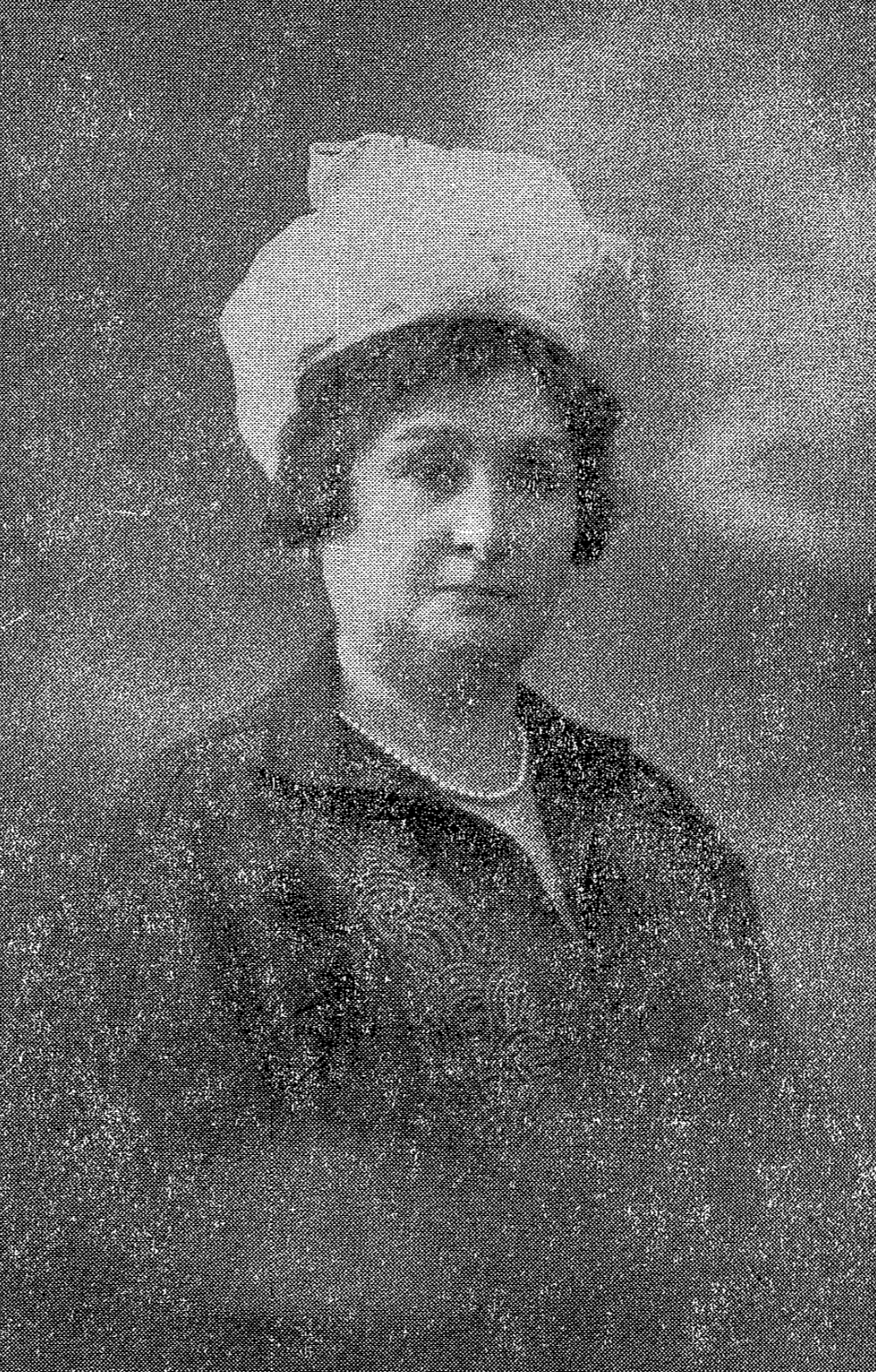
- Born: 2 January 1866; Tbilisi
- Died: 1952 (aged 85–86); Istanbul, Turkey
- Burial: Yahya Efendi Cemetery, Istanbul
- Spouse: Abdul Hamid II (m. 1885; died 1918)
- Issue: Şadiye Sultan
Names
- Turkish: Emsalinur Kadın; Ottoman Turkish: امثال نور قادین
- House: Ottoman (by marriage)
- Father: Ömer or Mehmed Bey
- Religion: Sunni Islam

Emsalinur Kadın (Ottoman Turkish: امثال نور قادین; "exemplary light"; 2 January 1866 – c. 1952; after the Surname Law of 1934: Emsalinur Kaya) was the seventh consort of Sultan Abdul Hamid II of the Ottoman Empire.

== Early life ==
Emsalinur Kadın was born in 1866 in Tbilisi. Her father was either named Ömer Bey, or Mehmed Bey. She had a younger sister named Tesrid Hanım, who in 1894, married Şehzade Ibrahim Tevfik, son of Şehzade Burhaneddin, and grandson of Sultan Abdulmejid I. Emsalinur was known for her beauty and grace.

== Marriage ==
Emsalinur married Abdul Hamid in 1885 in the Yıldız Palace, and was given the title of "Fifth Kadın". On 30 November 1886, a year after the marriage, she gave birth to her only child, a daughter, Şadiye Sultan. In 1895, she was elevated to the title of "Fourth Kadın" and in 1901 to the title of "Third Kadın". She built a mosque in Kırkpınar in 1907 and was gifted a mansion in Nişantaşı, where she lived after her husband's deposition.

On 27 April 1909, Abdul Hamid was deposed, and sent into exile in Thessaloniki. Emsalinur did not follow him, and so remained in Istanbul. After Thessaloniki fell to Greece in 1912, Abdul Hamid returned to Istanbul, and settled in the Beylerbeyi Palace, where he died in 1918.

== Widowhood and death ==
In 1924, the Imperial family was sent into exile. Emsalinur followed her daughter to Paris. However, after staying there for a few years, she returned to Istanbul, and settled in her mansion located in Nişantaşı.

In 1934, in accordance to the Surname Law, she took the surname "Kaya". After her mansion was sold by the ministry of finance, Emsalinur settled in her granddaughter's mansion located in Erenköy known as "Galip Paşa Mansion". However, after this mansion was also sold to Sabiha Gökçen, the world's first female fighter-pilot, in 1948, Emaslinur became homeless.

The government had allocated her one hundred liras per month. And with this amount of money it became difficult for her to rent a house. Emsalinur Kadin died homeless in 1952, at the age of approximately eighty-six, and was buried in Yahya Efendi Cemetery, Istanbul. Her daughter outlived her by twenty-five years, dying in 1977.

== Issue ==
Name	Birth	Death	Notes
Şadiye Sultan	30 November 1886	20 November 1977	married twice, and had issue, one daughter

== See also ==
- Kadın (title)
- Ottoman Imperial Harem
- List of consorts of the Ottoman sultans

== Sources ==
- Brookes, Douglas Scott (2010). The Concubine, the Princess, and the Teacher: Voices from the Ottoman Harem. University of Texas Press. ISBN 978-0-292-78335-5.
- Osmanoğlu, Ayşe (2000). Babam Sultan Abdülhamid. Mona Kitap Yayinlari. ISBN 978-6-050-81202-2.
- Sakaoğlu, Necdet (2008). Bu Mülkün Kadın Sultanları: Vâlide Sultanlar, Hâtunlar, Hasekiler, Kandınefendiler, Sultanefendiler. Oğlak Yayıncılık. ISBN 978-6-051-71079-2.
- Uluçay, M. Çağatay (2011). Padişahların kadınları ve kızları. Ötüken. ISBN 978-975-437-840-5.
