= Arife Kadriye Sultan =

Ottoman princess, daughter of Şehzade Ibrahim Tevfik

- Born: 24 March 1895; Yıldız Palace, Constantinople, Ottoman Empire (now Istanbul, Turkey)
- Died: 5 April 1933 (aged 38); Nice, France
- Spouse: Fenarizade Mehmed Raşid (m. 1914–1933)
- Issue: Melike Hanımsultan; Emire Hanımsultan
Names
- Turkish: Arife Kadriye Sultan; Ottoman Turkish: عارفه قادریه سلطان
- House: Ottoman
- Father: Şehzade Ibrahim Tevfik
- Mother: Fevziye Hanım
- Religion: Sunni Islam

Arife Kadriye Sultan (Ottoman Turkish: عارفه قادریه سلطان; 24 March 1895 – 5 April 1933) was an Ottoman princess, the daughter of Şehzade Ibrahim Tevfik and Fevziye Hanım.

== Biography ==
Arife Kadriye Sultan was born on 24 March 1895 in the Yıldız Palace. Her father was Şehzade Ibrahim Tevfik, son of Şehzade Mehmed Burhaneddin and Mestinaz Hanım, and grandson of Ottoman Sultan Abdülmejid I, and her mother was Fevziye Hanım, an Abkhazian. She was the oldest child of her father and the only child of her mother. Her mother died when she was three years old.

Arife married Fenarizade Mehmed Raşid on 13 December 1914 in the Nişantaşı Palace. On 6 February 1923, she gave birth to Melike Hanımsultan in Istanbul, and on 7 December 1927 to Emire Hanımsultan in Nice, France.

Upon the exile of the imperial family in 1924, Kadriye Sultan was sick, and so was allowed to remain in the capital until she recovered. Hatice Sultan, the daughter of Sultan Murad V also shared a mansion with her, which was used as a primary school. Following her recovery, she and her husband and daughters were exiled to Austria, and then to Nice, France. Arife was a pianist, and during the exile, she played the piano to make money for her family. She also composed various pieces for the piano. Her husband also used to sell matches on the streets. Arife befriended a Swiss lady, Rosa Keller, who was in France to study, and the two remained close until Arife's death.

Arife Kadriye died of tuberculosis on 5 April 1933 at the age of thirty-eight in Nice and was buried there. Before her death, Arife requested Rosa to marry her husband that after her death, so her children won't be deprived of a mother's love. Respecting her last wish, Rosa married Mehmed Raşid. The family then settled in Switzerland.

== Issue ==
By her marriage, Arife Kadriye had two daughters:

- Melike Hanımsultan (Istanbul, 6 February 1923 - 2007). She married Alfred "Freddy" Giraudy (1914-1998). They had a son:
  - Pierre Erol Giraudy-Osman (b. 14 December 1949). He married twice:
    - On 3 January 1980 to Marie Christine Mehouas. They had a son and a daughter:
      - Julien Cem Giraudy (b. 11 November 1980, Paris)
      - Magali Melike Giraudy (b. 10 October 1981, France)
    - On 23 October 1999 to Martine Robert
- Emire Hanımsultan (Nice, 7 December 1927 - Nice, 23 May 2004). On 17 January 1957 in Nice she married Joseph-René Chauvel. They had two sons and a daughter:
  - Jean-Mare Vely Chauvel (b. 16 October 1957, Nice). On 21 September 1983 in Nice he married Aline Kowalski. They had two daughters:
    - Delphine Marie Claire Roxane Chauvel (b. 2 April 1984, Nice)
    - Coralie Estelle Emire Chauvel (b. 2 May 1988, Nice)
  - Annick Kadriye Chauvel (b. 4 May 1959, Nice). She married Jean Pierre Ghiringhelli on 28 November 1987. They had two sons:
    - Roland Ghiringhelli (b. 6 May 1988, Nice)
    - Gaetan Ghiringhelli (b. 13 November 1990, Nice)
  - Franck Erol Chauvel (b. 21 November 1961, Nice). He had a son:
    - Anthony Daniel Giovanni Chauvel (b. 1 March 1998, Nice)

== Sources ==
- Bardakçı, Murat (2017). Neslishah: The Last Ottoman Princess. Oxford University Press. ISBN 978-9-774-16837-6.
- Kırpık, Cevdet (2011). "Şehzade Evliliklerinde Değişim". OTAM (in Turkish) (26): 165–192.
