= Pakize Tarzi =

Turkish physician (1910–2004)

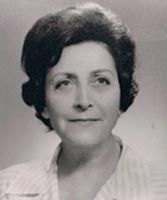
- Born: Pakize Izzet; 1910; Aleppo, Ottoman Empire
- Died: October 10, 2004 (aged 93–94); Istanbul, Turkey
- Education: Bursa American Girls College; Istanbul University
- Occupations: Obstetrics, gynecologist
- Years active: 1932-1998
- Known for: First gynecologist woman in Turkey, first woman assistant professor in a Turkish university, first woman to swim across the Bosphorus
- Spouse: Fettah Tarzi (m. 1935)
- Children: Fatma Tarzi; Zeynep Tarzi; Mahmut Tarzi
- Father: Saltik Bey Tarzi
- Relatives: Şehzade Ertuğrul Osman (son in law); Soraya Tarzi (aunt in law)

Pakize İzzet Tarzi (1910 – 10 October 2004) was a Turkish physician. She is renowned for being the first female gynecologist in the Republic of Turkey.

== Early life ==
Tarzi was born in Ottoman Aleppo in 1910. Her father was the Inspectorates-General of the Ziraat Bankası in Aleppo. The family moved to Adana once the British captured Damascus in 1918, and then to Konya once the French took control of Adana. She studied her secondary education at the Sörler Okulu and then decided to pursue a career as a doctor during her studies at the Bursa American Girls College. She finished her studies in Medicine in 1932.

On 21 July 1949, she opened the first women's clinic, the "Pakize İ. Tarzi Kliniği", in Şişli district of Istanbul, Turkey.

She is also known as the very first Turkish woman who swam across the Bosphorous in the 1930s.

== Personal life ==
In 1935, she married Fettah Tarzi, who was the nephew of Soraya Tarzi, wife of the Afghan King Amanullah Khan. They had two daughters, Fatma and Zeynep, and a son, Mahmut. Zeynep Tarzi was the second wife of the Imperial Ottoman Prince Ertuğrul Osman.

Tarzi died at the age of 94.
