= Fatma Pesend Hanım =

Consort of Ottoman Sultan Abdul Hamid II (c.1876–1928)

Pesend Hanım
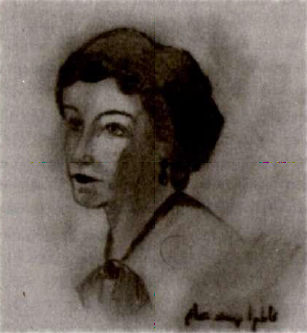
- Born: Fatma Kadriye Hanim Achba; 13 February 1876; Achba Mansion, Horhor, Istanbul, Ottoman Empire (present day Istanbul, Turkey)
- Died: 5 November 1924 (aged 48); Vaniköy Mansion, Vaniköy, Istanbul, Turkey
- Burial: Karacaahmet Cemetery, Üsküdar, Istanbul
- Spouse: Abdul Hamid II (m. 1896; died 1918)
- Issue: Hatice Sultan
Names
- Turkish: Fatma Kadriye Pesend Hanım; Ottoman Turkish: فاطمه پسند خانم
- House: Achba (by birth); Ottoman (by marriage)
- Father: Ahmed Sami Bey Achba
- Mother: Fatıma Ismailevna Mamleeva
- Religion: Sunni Islam

Pesend Hanım (Ottoman Turkish: فاطمه پسند خانم, lit. 'lovely'; born Princess Fatma Kadriye Achba; 13 February 1876 – 5 November 1924) was a consort of Sultan Abdul Hamid II of the Ottoman Empire.

== Early life ==
Fatma Pesend Hanım was born on 13 February 1876 in Achba Mansion, Horhor, Istanbul. Born as Fatma Kadriye Hanim Achba, she was a member of Abkhazian princely family Achba. Her father was Prince Ahmed Sami Bey, the son of Prince Ahmed Bey and Patıma Hanım Eşba. Her mother was Princess Fatıma Hanım Ismailevna Mamleeva, the daughter of Tatar prince Ismail Bey Mamleeva and Zehra Hanım, a Giray princess. She had an elder sister Princess Ayşe Mahizer Hanım, and a younger brother. Leyla Achba, another Abkhazian princess, was her niece. She was a painter and pianist by avocation. She also spoke French and Italian, and enjoyed horseback riding, especially with Arabian horses. She had a very extensive knowledge and loved to read books. She was beautiful, tall and curvy with blue eyes and long curly brown hair.

== Marriage ==
Fatma's father, Sami Bey, was in service of Sultan Abdulaziz's eldest son Şehzade Yusuf Izzeddin, and later Abdul Hamid's eldest son Şehzade Mehmed Selim. His consort, Fatıma Hanım, was once invited by Şehzade Selim’s mother Bedrifelek Kadınefendi, and she decided to bring her two daughters with her.

When they arrived at Yıldız Palace, they got out of their carriage and walked to the residence of the Imperial Consort, passing through the private residence of the sultan. Abdülhamid II was at the window and saw them arriving. Princess Fatma stopped walking and observed him, asking who that man was. The kalfas looked around and when they saw their master, exclaimed: "Dear Lord, that is the sultan!” Princess Fatma graciously bowed to him and continued on her way.

That act greatly pleased Abdülhamid II, who sent for the High Hazinedar and asked who that young girl was, and learned that she was the daughter of Sami Bey, in service to his son Selim Efendi. After a few days, the sultan spoke to Sami Bey and sought Princess Fatma's hand in marriage. Sami Bey consented to Abdul Hamid's proposal, and the marriage took place on 20 July 1896 at the Yıldız Palace. She was given the name "Fatma Pesend Hanim", and the title of "Fourth Ikbal". On 10 July 1897, a year after the marriage, she gave birth to her only child, a daughter Hatice Sultan, who lived only eight months and died because of illness.

Hatice's early death in 1898 prompted Abdul Hamid to order the construction of a modern hospital in Istanbul exclusively for the treatment of children and pregnant women. The construction of the hospital started on 12 May 1898 and was completed on 5 June 1899. It was called "Hamidiye Etfal Hastahane-i Âlisi", and was completely Abdul Hamid's creation and totally under his supervision. Pesend would visit it every week and paid particular attention to the conditions of orphaned children. She also provided financial assistance to less privileged families, and once she even took off one of her necklaces and gave it to a poor woman.

Fatma Pesend was among the favored consorts of Abdul Hamid II, alongside Müşfika Kadın and Saliha Naciye Kadın. The sultan was particularly fond of her and placed considerable trust in her. She was regarded positively within the palace and held a degree of influence, and she was also known outside the palace among the public for her character and appearance.

Ayşe Sultan, her step-daug er, notes in her memoirs that whenever Dilber Cenan Hanım, Abdul Hamid's wetnurse, visited the palace, she would stay as a guest in Fatma Pesend's household.

On 27 April 1909, Abdul Hamid was deposed, and sent into exile in Thessaloniki. Fatma Pesend was closed to Abdul Hamid, and so accompanied him to exile. However, in 1910, a year later, she returned to Istanbul. She would not see him again. After Thessaloniki fell to Greece in 1912, Abdul Hamid also returned to Istanbul, and settled in the Beylerbeyi Palace, where he died in 1918. In Istanbul, she lived with her father but she just could not forget her husband so, when he was brought back after the Greeks had taken Thessaloniki, she petitioned for various times to be allowed to live in Beylerbeyi Palace with him, but she never received permission. When Abdülhamid II died in 1918, she cut her hair off and threw them into the sea as a sign of mourning.

== Last years and death ==
At the exile of the imperial family in March 1924, Fatma Pesend remained in Istanbul where she lived a humble life. She died in her villa at Vaniköy, on 5 November 1924, and was buried at Karacaahmet Cemetery at Üsküdar, with her mother.

== Issue ==
| Name | Birth | Death | Notes |
|---|---|---|---|
| Hatice Sultan | 10 July 1897 | 14 February 1898 | born and died in Yıldız Palace, buried in Yahya Efendi Cemetery |

== In popular culture ==
- In the 2003 film Abdülhamid Düşerken, Fatma Pesend Hanım is portrayed by Turkish actress Mihrace Yeken.

== See also ==
- Ikbal (title)
- Ottoman Imperial Harem
- List of consorts of the Ottoman sultans

== Sources ==
- Açba, Leyla (2004). Bir Çerkes prensesinin harem hatıraları. L & M. ISBN 978-9-756-49131-7.
- Tuna, Mahinur (2007). İlk Türk kadın ressam: Mihri Rasim (Müşfik) Açba : 1886 İstanbul-1954 New-York. As Yayın. ISBN 978-9-750-17250-2.
- Brookes, Douglas Scott (2010). The Concubine, the Princess, and the Teacher: Voices from the Ottoman Harem. University of Texas Press. ISBN 978-0-292-78335-5.
- Osmanoğlu, Ayşe (2000). Babam Sultan Abdülhamid. Mona Kitap Yayinlari. ISBN 978-6-050-81202-2.
- Sakaoğlu, Necdet (2008). Bu mülkün kadın sultanları: Vâlide sultanlar, hâtunlar, hasekiler, kadınefendiler, sultanefendiler. Oğlak Yayıncılık. ISBN 978-9-753-29623-6.
- Uluçay, Mustafa Çağatay (2011). Padişahların kadınları ve kızları. Ankara: Ötüken. ISBN 978-9-754-37840-5.
