= Şadiye Sultan =

Ottoman princess,sister of Sultan Abdul Hamid II (1886–1977)

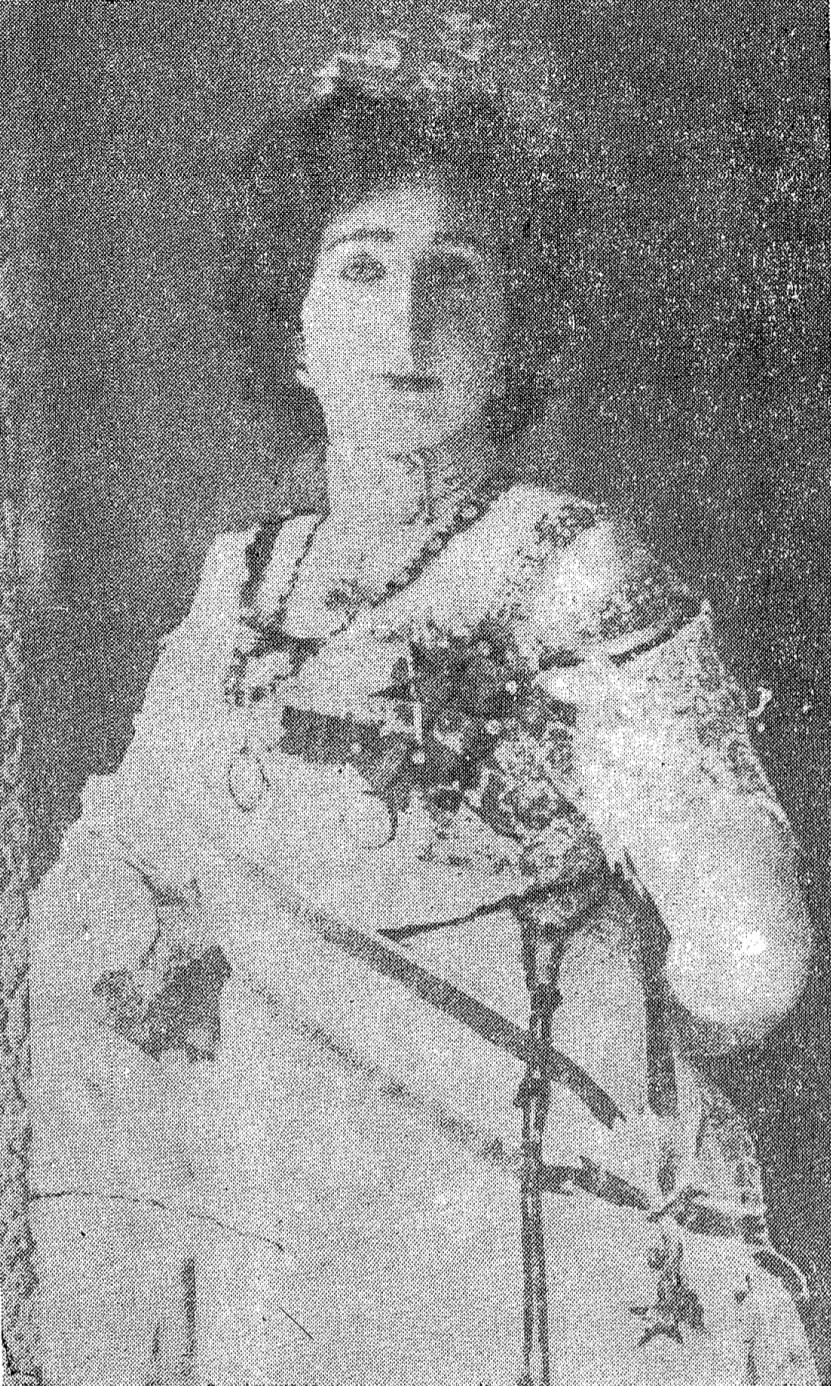
- Born: 30 November 1886; Yıldız Palace, Constantinople, Ottoman Empire
- Died: 20 November 1977 (aged 90); Cihangir, Istanbul, Turkey
- Burial: Mahmud II Mausoleum, Divanyolu, Istanbul
- Spouse: Fahir Bey (m. 1910; died 1922) Reşad Halis Bey (m. 1931; died 1944)
- Issue: First marriage Samiye Hanımsultan
Names
- Turkish: Şadiye Sultan; Ottoman Turkish: شادیه سلطان
- Dynasty: Ottoman
- Father: Abdul Hamid II
- Mother: Emsalinur Kadın
- Religion: Sunni Islam

Şadiye Sultan (Ottoman Turkish: شادیه سلطان; 30 November 1886 – 20 November 1977) was an Ottoman princess and memoir writer, the daughter of Sultan Abdul Hamid II and Emsalinur Kadın.

== Early life and education ==
Şadiye Sultan was born on 30 November 1886 in the Yıldız Palace. Her father was Sultan Abdul Hamid II, son of Abdulmejid I and Tirimüjgan Kadın. Her mother was Emsalinur Kadın. She was the only child of her mother.

Şadiye Sultan's education took place in a study room in the Lesser Chancellery of the Yıldız Palace, together with her younger sister Ayşe Sultan. Their instructors were the privy secretary Hasib Efendi and the Private Enciphering Secretary Kâmil Efendi. Hasib Efendi would give lessons in the Quran, Arabic, and Persian, while Kâmil Efendi was to teach Turkish reading and writing, Ottoman grammar, arithmetic, history, and geography.

Şadiye also received Western music education from Lombardi Bey and Eastern music education from Tanburî Cemil Bey. She also learnt to play the piano, drum and oud.

== Engagements ==
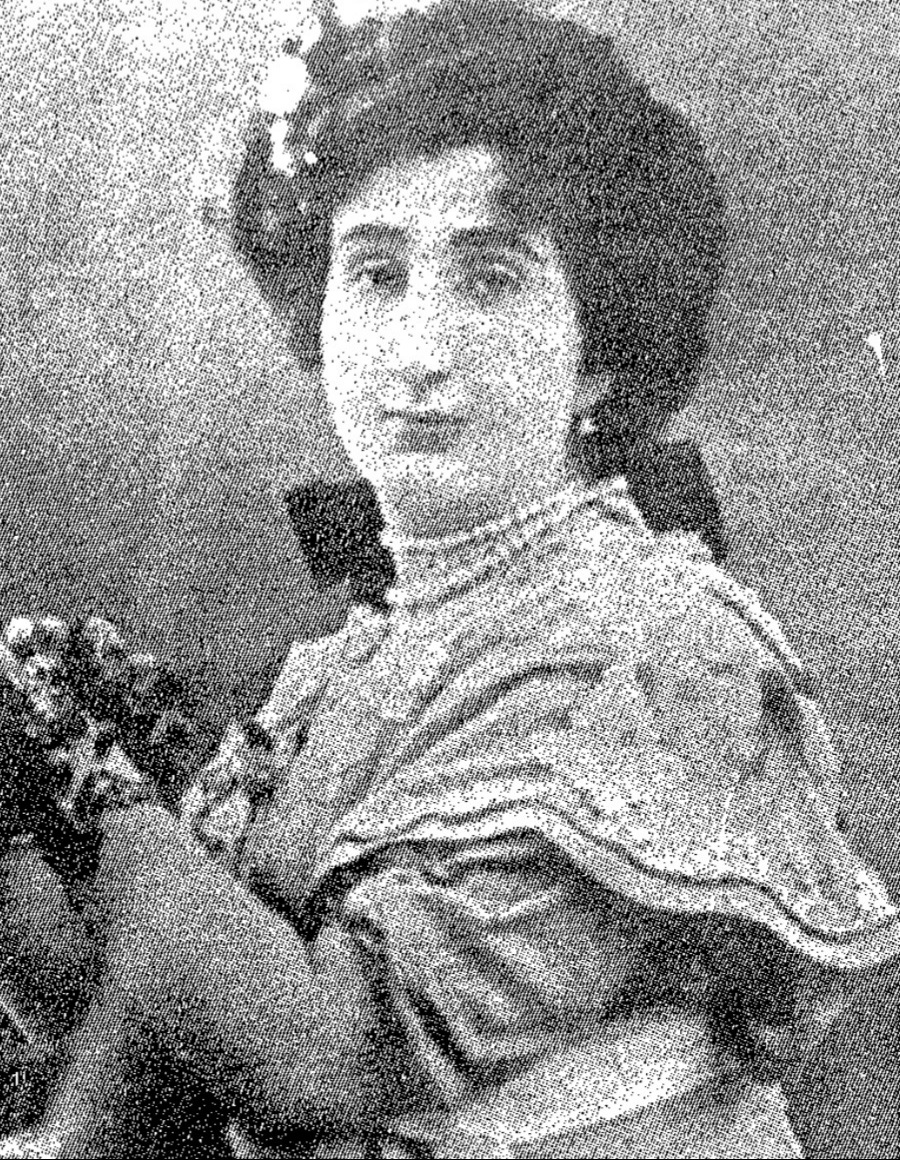
A young Şadiye Sultan

On 31 March 1909, Abdul Hamid betrothed her to Ali Namık Bey, son of Küçük Said Pasha. After the overthrow of her father in 1909, the princess followed her father into exile at Thessaloniki. The next year she returned to Istanbul. However, the engagement was broken off because of Said Pasha's attitude against her father. Enver Pasha also asked her hand in marriage, but she turned down this proposal, because he was involved in the deposition of her father. Her engagement was then set with a son of Zülüflü Ismail Pasha. He was congenial and handsome. However, the Ottoman government opposed the match.

== First marriage ==
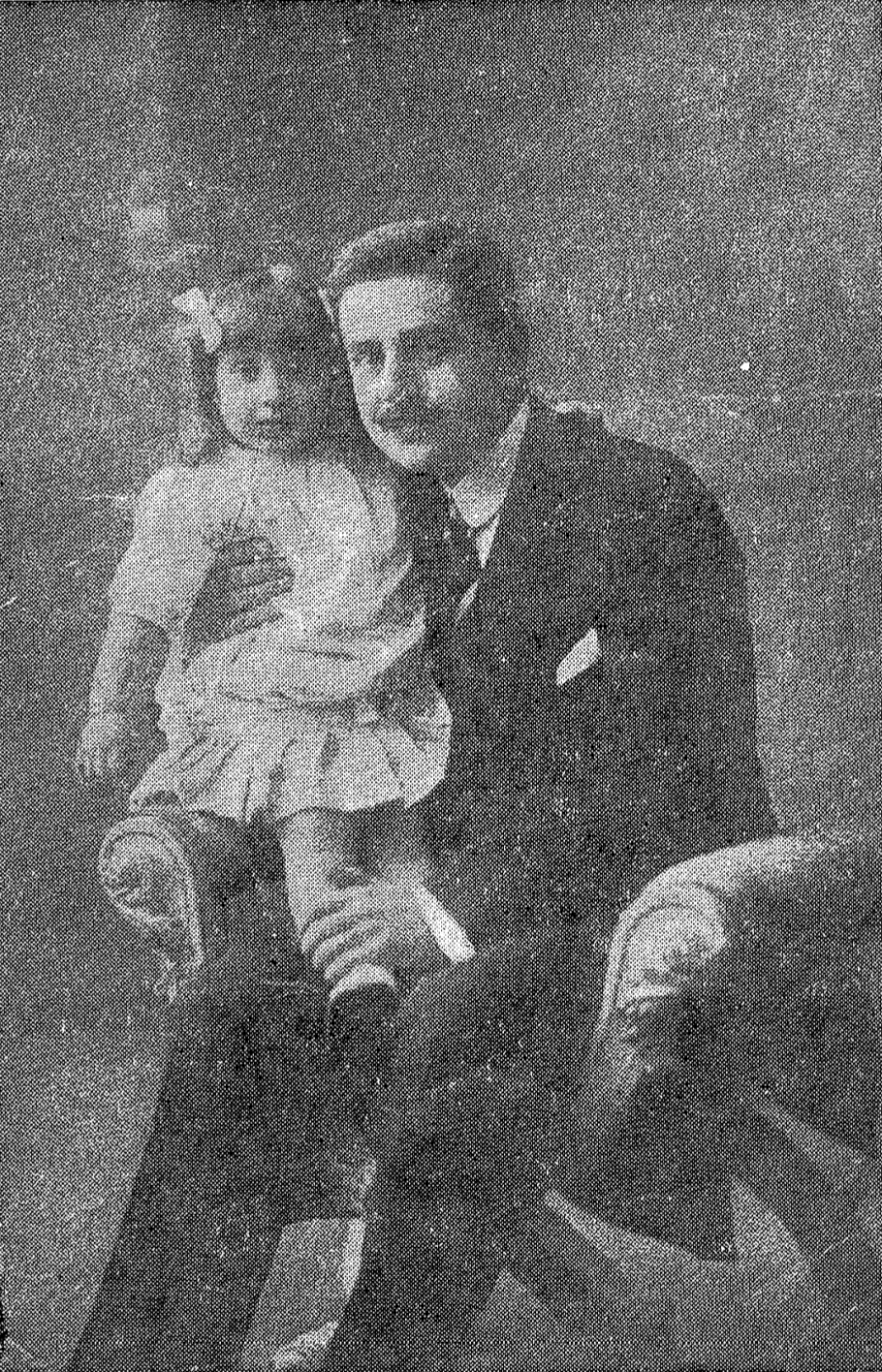
Şadiye's husband Fahir Bey and their daughter Samiye Hanımsultan

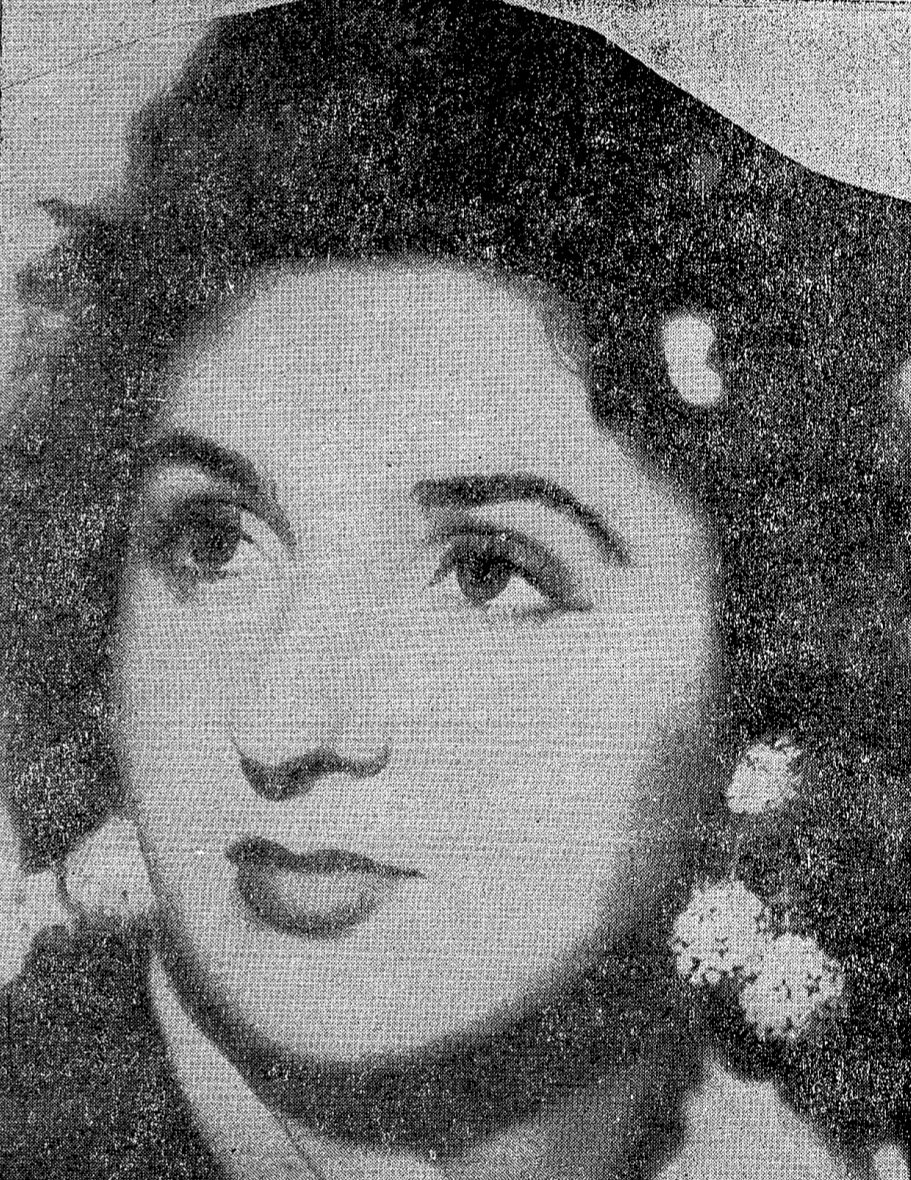
Samiye Hanımsultan

Şadiye was betrothed to Fahir Bey, son of Mustafa Fazıl Bey, and the grandson of Galib Pasha, the long-serving minister of pious foundations, rightly renowned for his uprightness and integrity. Fahir was an attractive, good-natured and well cultivated man. He was serving as a civil servant in the Embassy of Ottoman Empire in Bucharest. The marriage took place on 2 December 1910 in the Nişantaşı Palace. The couple had a daughter, Samiye Hanımsultan born in 1918. Şadiye was widowed at Fahir's death on 27 September 1922.

== Philanthropy ==
In 1912, the "Hilal-i Ahmer Centre for Women" was organised within the "Ottoman Hilal-i Ahmer Association", a foundation established in 1877 to provide medical care in Istanbul and surrounding communities. In May 1915, during the Gallipoli Campaign, as the member of this organisation, Şadiye donated two packages of cigarettes and some money to each of the soldiers at the hospital in Şişli.

== Second marriage ==
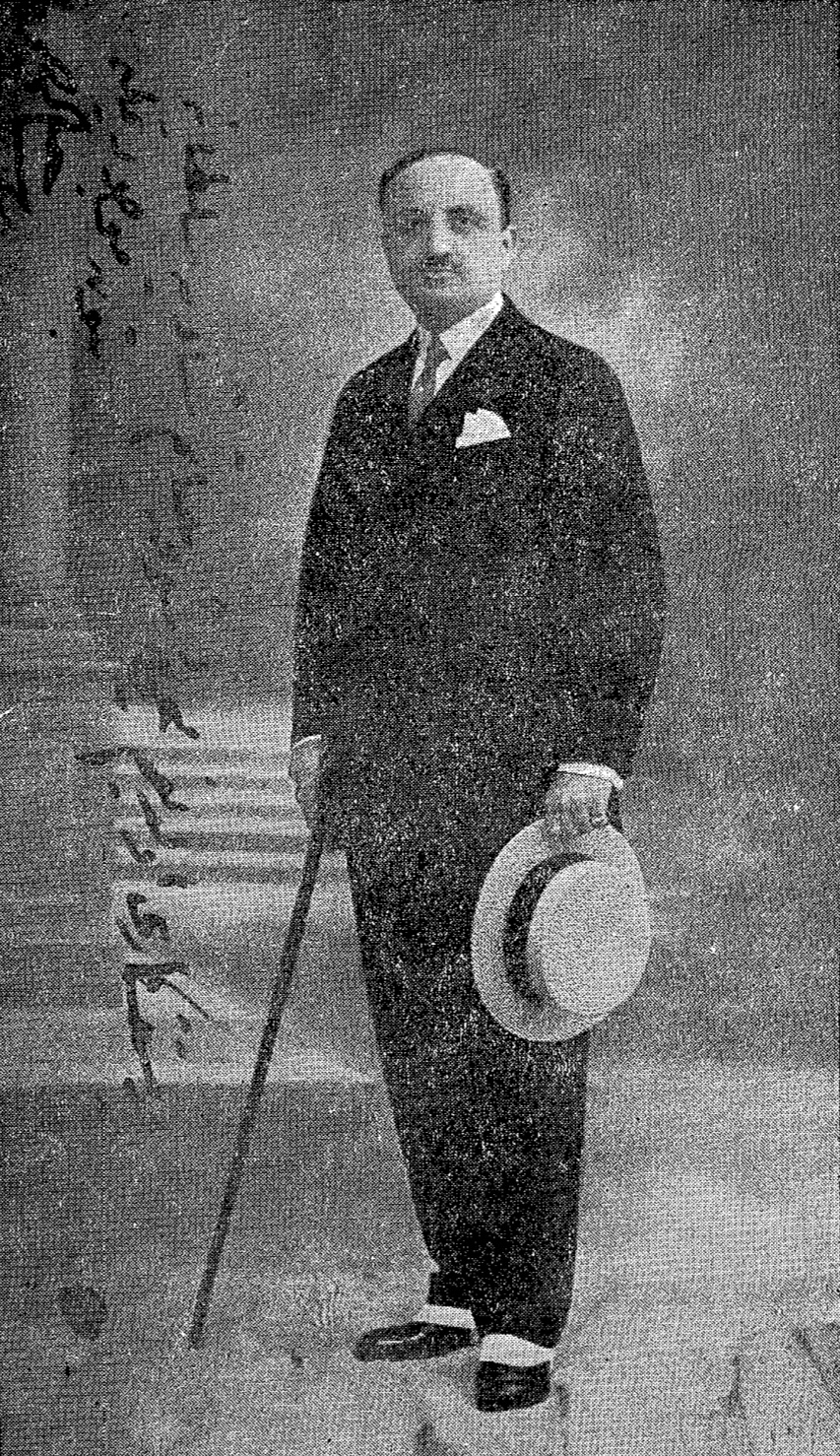
Şadiye Sultan's second husband, Reşad Halis Bey

Upon the exile of the imperial family in March 1924, Şadiye Sultan settled in Paris, where she married Reşad Halis Bey on 28 October 1931. Reşat was one of the ambassadors based in Paris. They had no children. She was widowed at his death in November 1944. She moved to the United States where she lived with her daughter and, after the end of the Second World War, traveled extensively around Europe. Finally, in 1953, he returned to Istanbul, where the exile for the princesses had been lifted the year before.

== Later life and death ==
After the death of her husband, Şadiye moved to Hotel Saint-Honore, and took a room adjacent to her brother Şehzade Abdurrahim Hayri, until her return to Istanbul in 1952 after the revocation of the law for the princesses. For several years, she faced hardships to settle on a permanent housing, however Şekercı Hacı Bekir rented her a house in Cihangir.

In 1966, she published her memoirs under the title Hayatımın acı ve tatlı günleri (The bitter and sweet days of my life). The same year she gave an interview about the life of her father, to reporter Muzaffer Budak Seyfettinoğlu from the magazine Yeni Istikal, whose 253rd issue was published on 15 June 1966.

She died in Cihangir at the age of ninety on 20 November 1977. She was the last surviving child of Sultan Abdul Hamid. She was buried in the tomb of her great-grandfather Sultan Mahmud II, located in Divanyolu, Istanbul. Her daughter outlived her by fifteen years, dying in 1992.

== Honours ==
- Order of the House of Osman
- Order of the Medjidie, Jeweled
- Order of Charity, 1st Class
- Liakat Medal in Gold
- Iftikhar Sanayi Medal in Gold
- Hicaz Demiryolu Medal in Gold

== Issue ==
Name	Birth	Death	Notes
By Fahir Bey (married 2 December 1910; 1882 – 27 September 1922)
Samiye Hanımsultan	c. 1918	20 November 1992	Born in Nişantaşı Palace; Married without issue;

== In popular culture ==
- In the 2017 TV series Payitaht: Abdülhamid, Şadiye Sultan was portrayed by Turkish child actress Leya Kırşan.

== Sources ==
- Brookes, Douglas Scott (2010). The Concubine, the Princess, and the Teacher: Voices from the Ottoman Harem. University of Texas Press. ISBN 978-0-292-78335-5.
- Sakaoğlu, Necdet (2008). Bu mülkün kadın sultanları: Vâlide sultanlar, hâtunlar, hasekiler, kadınefendiler, sultanefendiler. Oğlak Yayıncılık. ISBN 978-9-753-29623-6.
- Uluçay, Mustafa Çağatay (2011). Padişahların kadınları ve kızları. Ankara: Ötüken. ISBN 978-9-754-37840-5.
