= Müşfika Kadın =

Consort of Ottoman Sultan Abdul Hamid II

- Born: Ayşe Ağır c. 1872; Caucasus
- Died: 18 July 1961 (aged 88–89); Gazi Osmanpaşa Mansion, Serencebey Street 53, Yıldız, Istanbul, Turkey
- Burial: Yahya Efendi Cemetery
- Spouse: Abdul Hamid II (m. 1886; died 1918)
- Issue: Hamide Ayşe Sultan
Names
- Turkish: Ayşe Destizer Müşfika Kadın; Ottoman Turkish: مشفقه قادین
- House: Ağır (by birth); Ottoman (by marriage)
- Father: Mahmud Ağır Bey
- Mother: Emine Hanım
- Religion: Sunni Islam

Destizer Müşfika Kadın (Turkish pronunciation: [myʃfikʰa kʰadɯn]; Ottoman Turkish: مشفقه قادين; meaning "the compassionate one"; born Ayşe Ağır; c. 1872 – 18 July 1961; after the Surname Law of 1934: Müşfika Kayısoy) was the eighth consort of Sultan Abdul Hamid II of the Ottoman Empire.

== Early life ==
Müşfika Kadın was born in 1872 in the Caucasus. Born as Ayşe, she was a member of Abkhazian noble family, Ağır. Her father was Gazi Şehid Ağır Mahmud Bey, and her mother was Emine Hanım. She had a sister named Fatma Hanım one year younger than her, as well as a brother named Şahin Bey seven years older than her. Mahmud Bey volunteered for service in the Ottoman-Russian war of 1877–78, entrusting his wife and children to the care of Hüseyin Vasfi Pasha, an army officer posted in the area.

Hüseyin Vasfi Pasha's wife Bezminigar Hanım was Mahmud Bey's cousin, hence a close relative, and moreover had been in service to valide sultan Pertevniyal Sultan before her marriage, so for these reasons the pasha sent Mahmud Bey's family to live with his wife in Istanbul. At that time Ayşe was three years old, Fatma was two and Şahin Bey ten. In those days Pertevniyal Sultan was despondent over the death of her son Sultan Abdulaziz. Her only pleasure and distraction lay in passing time by training young children, gathering them about her and finding consolation in their behavior.

Knowing these things, Bezminigar Hanım decided to present Mahmud Bey's family to Pertevniyal Sultan. With difficulty she won over Emine Hanım, then she took the two girls round. Pertevniyal Sultan was enchanted by Emine Hanım's beautiful face, blue eyes and blonde hair and by the sweet aspects of Fatma's head of curls. She adopted the two girls and ordered Navekyar Kalfa to look after Ayşe and Şevkidide Kalfa to look after Fatma, under the protection of her own high Hazinedar Şemsicemal Kalfa, and changed their names, as palace tradition had it, calling her Destizer (Ottoman Turkish: دست زر), and her sister Destiper. Their mother Emine Hanım and older brother Şahin Bey remained in the home of Bezminigar Hanım, but when the word arrived that Mahmud Bey had been killed in the war, despite all attempts to dissuade them, they returned to the palace which they had come from. After this nothing further was heard of them.

When Pertevniyal Sultan died in 1883, as custom dictated all the servants in the villa, headed by the High Hazinedar, were transferred to Dolmabahçe Palace.

== Marriage ==
Destizer grew into a young lady in Dolmabahçe Palace. She was beautiful, tall and blonde with blue eyes, and she was known for her elegance and when she entered her fourteenth year she was noticed by Abdul Hamid II, who in those days was in the habit of going to the harem after the ceremony of receiving felicitations on festival days. She was taken to the Yıldız Palace straightaway.

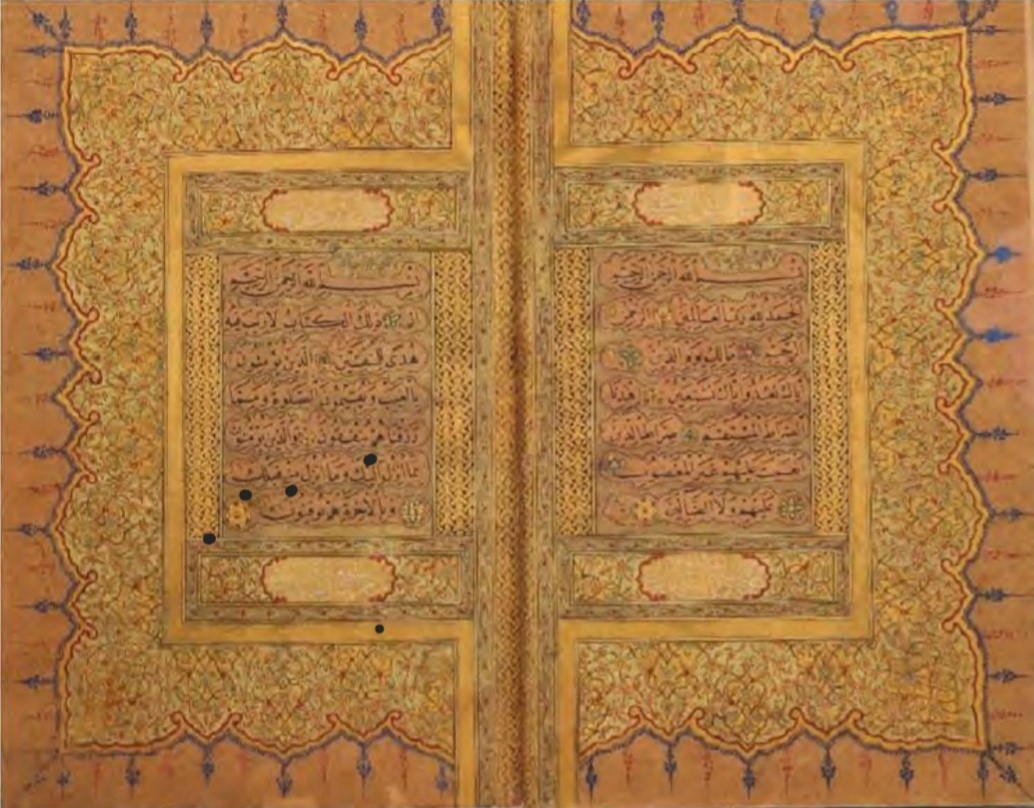
Copy of the Quran, which was made in nesih talik by Kazasker Mustafa Izzet Efendi in 1871, presented to Müşfika as a wedding gift by Abdul Hamid in 1886, and donated by her to the tomb of Abdul Hamid in 1918

The marriage took place on 12 February 1886, and was performed by the Deputy of the Noble Sweeper, Seyid Esad Efendi and witnessed by the Superintendent of Departures, Hacı Mahmud Efendi, by the Imam of Kağıthane, Ali Efendi and by the Senior Equerry, Şerafeddin Ağa. As his first gift to her, Abdul Hamid presented her with an exquisite copy of the Quran, which was made in nesih talik by Kazasker Mustafa Izzet Efendi (died 1876) in 1871. He gave her the name "Müşfikâ" after opening the Quran and being inspired by Müşfikun, and the title of "Third Ikbal". Later she became "Senior Ikbal" and finally "Fourth Kadın" in 1909. She was, together Saliha Naciye Kadın and Pesend Hanım, one of Abdül Hamid's favorite consorts, and she and Saliha Naciye was the only to remain with him until his death, while ti Pesend Hanim was not allowed this, but when she learned of his death she cut her hair as a sign of mourning.

As had been the case with Abdul Hamid's other consorts, once Müşfika joined their ranks the apartments known as the Lesser Chancellery were then made ready. A household staff was delegated, with Dilesrar Kalfa appointed mistress of the household. She was well known in the palace because she had been in service since the latter days of the reign of Sultan Abdulmejid I and had served Sultan Abdulaziz.

Abdul Hamid made Müşfika's sister, Destiper hazinedar with the name of Şükriye Hanım. When Şükriye Hanım came of age, she was given in marriage to Halid Pasha, the second son of Abdul Hamid's Master of the Robes Ismet Bey, whose mother was Abdul Hamid's wet nurse. In 1917, some five months before Abdul Hamid's death, Şükriye Hanım died of typhoid. Abdul Hamid was in Beylerbeyi Palace when he was informed of her death, and it was Abdul Hamid who paid the expenses for her shroud and for laying out her corpse. She lies in the cemetery at Rumeli Hisarı.

On 15 November 1887, a year after the marriage, she gave birth to her only daughter, Hamide Ayşe Sultan, who was, with Naime Sultan, one of Abdülhamid's favorite daughters. Abdul Hamid presented a brooch to Filürye Kalfa, who had brought the news of Ayşe's birth to him. Ebezade Kamile Hanım, who served as midwife at Ayşe's birth was presented with three hundred liras, and Dr. Triandafilidis, the specialist in women's diseases of that era who had examined and treated Müşfika every week during her pregnancy was conferred with a decoration.

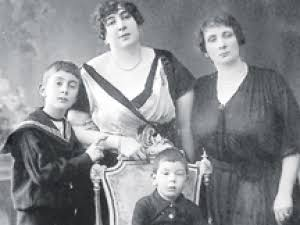
Müşfika (far right) with her daughter, Ayşe Sultan, and grandsons, Sultanzade Ömer Nami Bey and Sultanzade Osman Nami Bey

Before Ayşe's birth Abdul Hamid had ordered the construction of a villa known as the New Villa on the grounds of Yıldız Palace. In 1888, when Ayşe was seven months old Abdul Hamid relocated her to this villa. Until the end of his reign, Abdul Hamid used to have dinner with Müşfika in her apartments.

On 27 April 1909, Abdul Hamid was deposed, and sent into exile in Thessaloniki, and Müşfika and Ayşe accompanied him. Ayşe returned to Istanbul in 1910, however, Müşfika remained with him. But after Thessaloniki fell to Greece in 1912, she returned to Istanbul with Abdul Hamid, and settled in the Beylerbeyi Palace. She remained with Abdul Hamid until he died in her arms in 1918.

== Widowhood ==
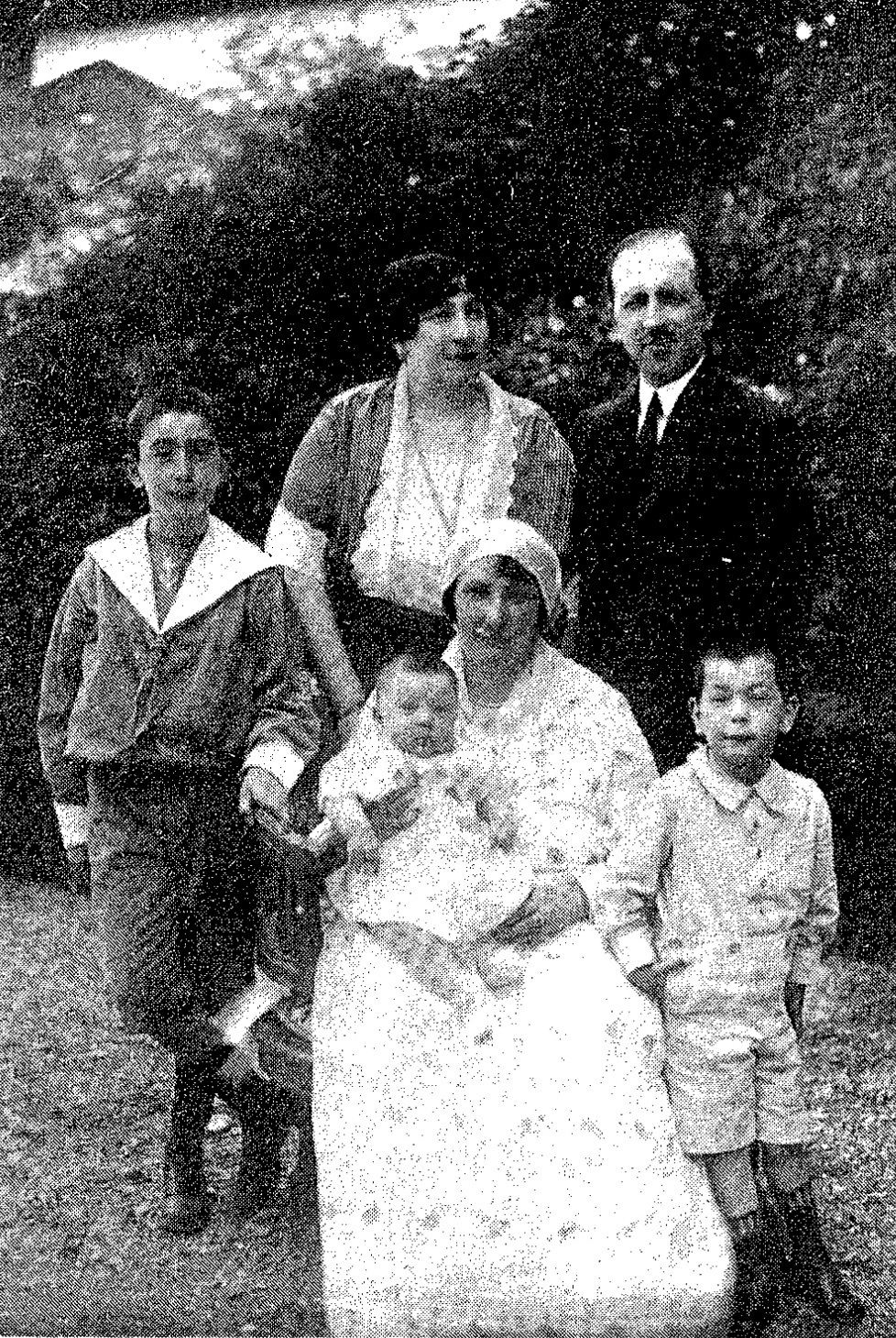
Müşfika Kadın (seated centre) in 1923

After Abdul Hamid's death, she moved to Yıldız Palace. She donated the Quran, that Abdul Hamid had presented to her at the time of her marriage, to the pious foundation that maintained Abdul Hamid's mausoleum and had her name inscribed in it.

In 1924, Ayşe, together with other members of his family, was sent into exile. As being an adjunct member of the imperial family Müşfika was not exiled, and chose to remain in Turkey. She took up Turkish nationality, and moved to Gazi Osmanpaşa's mansion on Serencebey Street 53. In 1934, in accordance to the Surname Law, she took the surname "Kayısoy" pertaining to Abdul Hamid's descendance from the Kayıhan tribe.

In 1936, she petitioned the Turkish government for restitution of property because she had become destitute. However, the Foreign Office noted that she had never been placed in effective ownership and possession of her share of Abdul Hamid's properties and revenues in Turkey at the time of Abdul Hamid's death or at any subsequent date. Also previously in 1925 and 1928 respectively, she and Şevket Mehmet Ali Bey, a banker representing her had given the power of attorney to Sami Günzberg, a well-known Turkish Jewish lawyer, authorizing him to regain from usurpers buildings, lands, mines, concessions left by Abdul Hamid situated in Turkish territory and elsewhere.

In 1944, she applied to the government for financial assistance, after which in 1949, President İsmet İnönü fixed her monthly allowance to two hundred liras. Unable to get along with this amount of allowance, she wrote to the then President Adnan Menderes in 1954, after which fifty liras were added to her allowance.

Ayşe returned to Istanbul in 1952, after some twenty eight years, and wrote her memoir, completing it by 1955. For large portions of the memoir she relied on Müşfika, as the two lived together after the princess's return to Turkey. The work originally appeared in the serial format in the Turkish popular magazine Hayat in the late 1950s, followed by its publication as a book in Istanbul in 1960, shortly before the princess's death.

== Death ==
Müşfika Kadın died of pleurisy on 16 July 1961 at the age of approximately eighty-nine, at Gazi Osmanpaşa's mansion on Serencebey Street 53, Yıldız, Istanbul, Turkey, nearly a year after her daughter's death. She is buried in the royal mausoleum of Yahya Efendi Cemetery.

== Issue ==
Name	Birth	Death	Notes
Hamide Ayşe Sultan	15 November 1887	10 August 1960	married twice, and had issue, three sons and one daughter

== In literature and popular culture ==
- In the 2011 TV series Kirli Oyunlar, Müşfika Kadın is portrayed by Turkish actress Deniz Gökçer.
- Müşfika is a character in Ahmet Altan's historical novel Like a Sword Wound (2018).

== See also ==
- Ikbal (title)
- Ottoman Imperial Harem
- List of consorts of the Ottoman sultans

== Sources ==
- Brookes, Douglas Scott (January 1, 2010). The Concubine, the Princess, and the Teacher: Voices from the Ottoman Harem. University of Texas Press. ISBN 978-0-292-78335-5.
- Kark, Ruth; Frantzman, Seth J. (2010). "One of the most Spectacular Lawsuits ever Launched": Abdülhamid's Heirs, his Lands and the Land Case in Palestine, 1908-1950". New Perspectives on Turkey. 42: 127–157. doi:10.1017/S0896634600005604. ISSN 0896-6346. S2CID 152210297.
- Osmanoğlu, Ayşe (2000). Babam Sultan Abdülhamid. Mona Kitap Yayinlari. ISBN 978-6-050-81202-2.
- Sakaoğlu, Necdet (2008). Bu mülkün kadın sultanları: Vâlide sultanlar, hâtunlar, hasekiler, kadınefendiler, sultanefendiler. Oğlak Yayıncılık. ISBN 978-9-753-29623-6.
- Uluçay, Mustafa Çağatay (2011). Padişahların kadınları ve kızları. Ankara: Ötüken. ISBN 978-9-754-37840-5.
