= Şehzade Ibrahim Tevfik =

Ottoman prince (1874–1931)

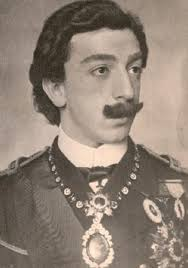
- Ibrahim Tevfik in military uniform
- Born: 6 November 1874; Dolmabahçe Palace, Constantinople, Ottoman Empire
- Died: 31 December 1931 (aged 57); Nice, France
- Burial: Nice, France
- Spouse: Fevziye Hanım (m. 1893; died 1898) Tesrid Hanım (m. 1894) Emine Hanım (m. 1911; div. 1916) Şadiye Hanım (m. 1919; div. 1930) Hayriye Hanım (m. 1927)
- Issue: Arife Kadriye Sultan; Fatma Zehra Sultan; Rabia Nilüfer Sultan; Ayşe Masume Fethiye Sultan; Şehzade Burhaneddin Cem; Şehzade Bayezid Osman; Fevziye Sultan
Names
- Turkish: Şehzade Ibrahim Tevfik; Ottoman Turkish: شهزادہ ابراهیم توفیق
- House: Ottoman
- Father: Şehzade Mehmed Burhaneddin
- Mother: Mestinaz Hanım
- Religion: Sunni Islam
- Military career
- Allegiance: Ottoman Empire
- Branch: Ottoman Navy; Ottoman Army
- Service years: 1878–1922 (active service)
- Rank: See list

Şehzade Ibrahim Tevfik Efendi (Ottoman Turkish: شهزادہ ابراهیم توفیق; 6 November 1874 – 31 December 1931) was an Ottoman prince, the son of Şehzade Mehmed Burhaneddin, and grandson of Sultan Abdulmejid I.

== Early life ==
Şehzade Ibrahim Tevfik was born on 6 November 1874 in the Dolmabahçe Palace. His father was Şehzade Mehmed Burhaneddin, son of Abdulmejid I and Nükhetsezâ Hanım, and his mother was Mestinaz Hanım. He had a younger sister, who died aged four. After his father's death in 1876, Sultan Abdul Hamid II brought him up in his care. For several years he believed the sultan to be his real father.

His circumcision took place on 17 December 1883, together with Şehzade Mehmed Selim, eldest son of Sultan Abdul Hamid, Abdulmejid II, Şehzade Mehmed Şevket and Şehzade Mehmed Seyfeddin, sons of Sultan Abdulaziz, and Şehzade Mehmed Ziyaeddin, son of Sultan Mehmed V.

== Education and career ==
His schooling began in 1880. His teacher was Eyüp Efendi. His subjects included morphology of Arabic, etiquettes, catechism, orthography, arithmetic, geography, geometry, cosmography, astronomy, French language, Islamic history, and ethical admonitions of Attar. Mehmed Eşref taught him Arabic, fiqh, and aqidah. Aranda Efendi taught him music.

In 1878, he was registered in the navy. In August 1883, he was given the rank of right wing lieutenant commander, and went on to become vice admiral. He was also appointed in the marine and in the imperial fire-fighting battalion. By 1918, he was serving as honorary brigadier in the Ottoman infantry.

== Personal life ==
Tevfik had been allocated a villa on the grounds of the Yıldız Palace. He also owned a waterside mansion in Beşiktaş. Here he bred various animals like dogs, parrots and lambs.

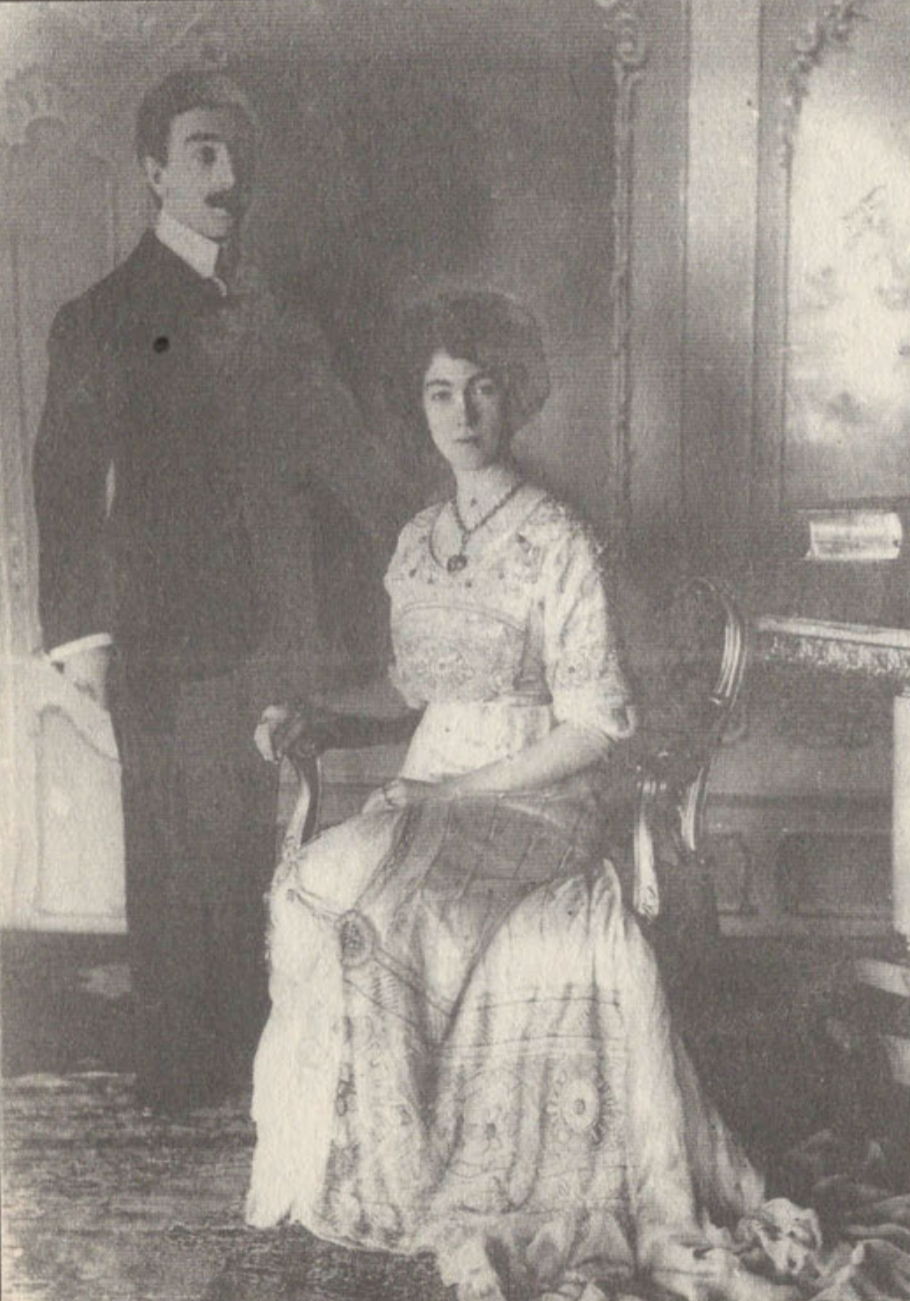
Şehzade Ibrahim Tevfik with his first wife Fevziye Hanım

He married five times and had seven children. His first wife was Fevziye Hanım. She was born on 5 August 1876 in Batumi, Adjara. She was an Abkhazian. They married on 2 May 1893 in the Yıldız Palace. In 1895, some two years later, she gave birth to Arife Kadriye Sultan. She died on 7 September 1898 in the Yıldız Palace.

His second wife was Tesrid Hanım. She was born on 10 September 1874 in Poti, Abkhazia. Her father was either named Ömer Bey, or Mehmed Bey. She was the sister of Emsalinur Kadın, wife of Sultan Abdul Hamid II. They married on 12 March 1894 in the Yıldız Palace. In 1895, she gave birth to Fatma Zehra Sultan. She died in 1945 in Beşiktaş, Istanbul.

His third wife was Emine Hanım. She was born on 28 October 1890 in Adapazarı, Istanbul. They married on 5 May 1911 in the Ortaköy Palace. In 1912, she gave birth to Rabia Nilüfer Sultan, followed by Ayşe Masume Fethiye Sultan in 1916. They divorced on 23 April 1916. Following the divorce, Emine and her daughters first settled with Sultan Mehmed VI, and later with Caliph Abdulmejid II. She died on 14 February 1953 in Beşiktaş, Istanbul.

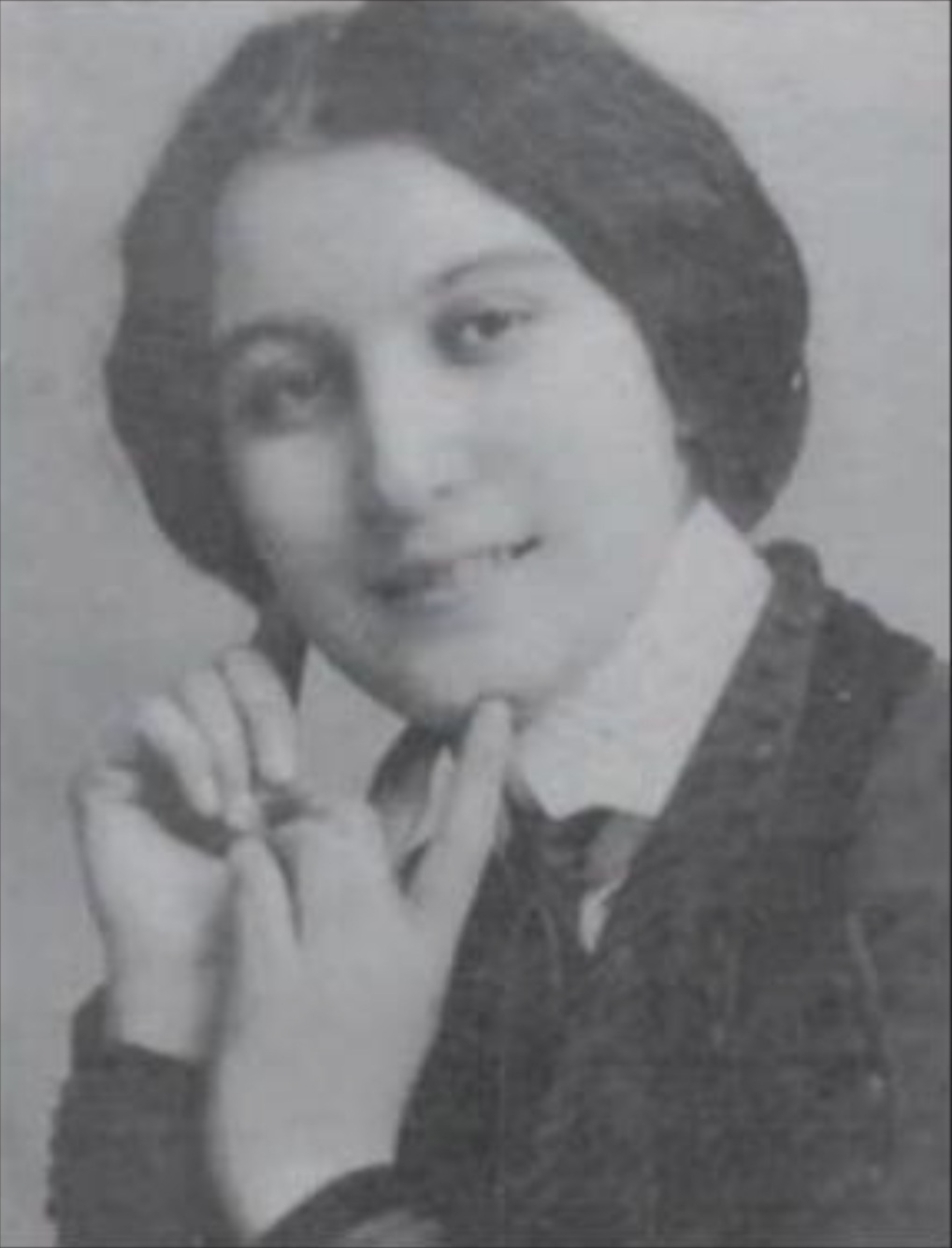
Şadiye Hanım, Ibrahim Tevfik's fourth wife

His fourth wife was Hatice Şadiye Hanım. She was born on 1 April 1898 in Kabataş, Istanbul. She was the daughter of Çürüksulu Süleyman Bahri Pasha Tavdgiridze and Hatice Hanım. They married on 27 March 1919 in the Beşiktaş Palace. In 1920, she gave birth to Şehzade Burhaneddin Cem, followed by Şehzade Bayezid Osman in 1924. They divorced in 1930. Following her divorce, Şadiye met American businessman William Thallon Daus in Paris. They married in 1932, and had two sons, Rudolph Halouk and Bahri Lawrence. She died on 9 August 1986.

His fifth wife was Hayriye Hanım. She was born in 1914. She was a Bosnian. They married in 1927. In 1928, she gave birth to a daughter, Fevziye Sultan. In 1930, she entrusted her daughter to Şehzade Ömer Faruk and Sabiha Sultan, and went to live with another relative. In 1931, after Tevfik's death, she came back to Nice, took her daughter, and went first to Paris, and then to Egypt, where she married a Tatar by the name of Seyfulin Bey, who brought up Fevziye as if she were his own daughter. She died on 4 August 2001 in Paris, France, and was buried in Muslim cemetery in Thiais, Val-de-Marne, France.

== Later life and death ==
In March 1920, following the Occupation of Constantinople, Tevfik and one of his wives were arrested by the British in order to threaten the Ottoman dynasty.

At the exile of the imperial family in March 1924, Tevfik settled in France with his two wives, three children and servants. His two daughters, who had already been married, were also exiled. The trustee assigned to sell all the properties the Ottoman dynasty left behind in Turkey betrayed them. He sold the properties, but he spent the money himself, putting Tevfik and his family in a very difficult financial situation.

Tevfik first moved to Paris with his family. They settled in a hotel in Champs-Élysées, where they lived for some time. Then they moved to a large apartment. Here his wife Şadiye Hanım led a very extravagant life, which left Tevfik penniless. He then went to live outside in Nice in a village up in the hills with his last wife Hayriye Hanım.

Although he was a piano virtuoso, Tevfik, who was very shy, could not play his piano to an audience and could only perform his art from behind a curtain. He was offered a position as a concert pianist at the Salle Pleyel in Paris but declined the offer.

Şehzade Ömer Faruk, who was also in financial trouble, was informed about Tevfik's situation and invited him and his family to his house in Nice, France. He was a quiet and peaceful person, whose presence was barely felt. He only left the house for one day a week.

He died of a heart attack on 31 December 1931, and was buried in a common grave next to a Christian.

== Personality ==
According to his son Bayezid Osman, he was a sensitive person, known for his delicateness, and someone who didn't care much about money.

== Honours ==
Styles of Şehzade Ibrahim Tevfik
- Reference style: His Imperial Highness
- Spoken style: Your Imperial Highness

- Order of Distinction, Jeweled
- Order of Osmanieh, Jeweled
- Order of the Medjidie, Jeweled
- Imtiyaz Medal in Silver
- Imtiyaz Medal in Gold
- Liakat War Medal in Gold
- Liakat Medal in Gold

=== Military appointments ===
==== Military ranks and naval appointments ====
- August 1883: Lieutenant-Commander, Ottoman Navy
- Vice-Admiral, Ottoman Navy

==== Honorary military appointments ====
- c. 1918: Brigadier of the Infantry Regiment, Ottoman Army

== Issue ==
Name	Birth	Death	Notes
By Fevziye Hanım (married 2 May 1893; 5 August 1876 – 7 September 1898)
Arife Kadriye Sultan	24 March 1895	5 April 1933	born in Yıldız Palace; married on 13 December 1913 in the Nişantaşı Palace to Fenarizade Mehmed Raşid, and had issue, two daughters; died in Nice, France, and was buried there;
By Tesrid Hanım (married 12 March 1894; 10 September 1874 – 1945)
Fatma Zehra Sultan	28 May 1895	26 May 1965	born in Yıldız Palace; married on 25 October 1917 in the Erenköy Palace to Selâmî Süleyman Alpan (1894 – 1945 in Haifa, Palestine), and had issue, a daughter (Biloun Hanimsultan Alpan, b. 25 August 1919, Istanbul. She had a daughter) and a son (Sultanzade Yavuz Alpan, b. 11 September 1928, he had a daughter); died in Istanbul, Turkey, and buried in tomb of Mahmud II;
By Emine Hanım (married 5 May 1911 – divorced 23 April 1916; 28 October 1890 – 14 February 1953)
Rabia Nilüfer Sultan	22 October 1912	21 September 1997	born in Ortaköy Palace; married firstly on 3 February 1931 to Michel Mourad Kefeli (20 January 1893 in Nikolaiev, Russian Empire – 31 March 1966 in Paris, France), and had issue a son (Sultanzade Yusuf Mecid Kefeli, b. 16 November 1932, Parigi. He had two daughters, both with issue), married secondly in 1950 to Joseph Ciernoski (1902 – 1987) in New York City; died in New York City, US;
Ayşe Masume Fethiye Sultan	20 August 1916	1944	born in Kuruçeshme Palace; married in 1930 to Rashid Shafiq Bey, and had a daughter (Nilüfer Hanımsultan Shafiq, b. 14 September 1942, Cairo, with issue); died in Cairo, Egypt;
By Şadiye Hanım (married 27 March 1919 – divorced 1930; 1 April 1898 – 9 August 1986)
Şehzade Burhaneddin Cem	20 February 1920	31 October 2008	born in Beşiktaş Palace; married Irène Israeosseksky in 1951 in Paris, and had a daughter (Nilüfer Sultan Cem, b. 19 March 1954, she had a daughter) and a son (Şehzade Selim Cem, b. 5 September 1955) died in New York, US;
Şehzade Bayezid Osman	24 June 1924	7 January 2017	born in Paris, France; died unmarried in New York City, United States;
By Hayriye Hanım (married 1927; 1914 – 4 August 2001)
Fevziye Sultan	28 October 1928	9 April 2014	born in Paris, France; married in 1951 to Mehmed Hüseyin Hayri (born 23 December 1924); died in Paris, France, and was buried in Muslim Cemetery in Thais, Val-de-Marne, France;

== Sources ==
- Adra, Jamil (2005). Genealogy of the Imperial Ottoman Family 2005.
- Bardakçı, Murat (2017). Neslishah: The Last Ottoman Princess. Oxford University Press. ISBN 978-9-774-16837-6.
- Brookes, Douglas Scott (January 1, 2010). The Concubine, the Princess, and the Teacher: Voices from the Ottoman Harem. University of Texas Press. ISBN 978-0-292-78335-5.
- Kırpık, Cevdet (2007-08-20). "Şehzade Eğitimini Çağdaşlaştırma Teşebbüsleri". Belleten. 71 (261): 575–612. doi:10.37879/belleten.2007.575. S2CID 231273206.
- Kırpık, Cevdet (2011). "Şehzade Evliliklerinde Değişim". OTAM (in Turkish) (26): 165–192.
- Korkmaz, Mehmet (2019-12-30). "Denizin Saraylıları: Bahriye'de Osmanlı Şehzadeleri". Hazine-i Evrak Arşiv ve Tarih Araştırmaları Dergisi (in Turkish). 1 (1): 42–65.
