= Nükhetsezâ Hanım =

Consort of Ottoman Sultan Abdulmejid I

- Born: Hatice Hanim Hatug; 2 January 1827; Abkhazia
- Died: 15 May 1850 (aged 23); Constantinople, Ottoman Empire (present day Istanbul, Turkey)
- Burial: Imperial ladies Mausoleum, New Mosque, Istanbul
- Spouse: Abdulmejid I (m. 1845)
- Issue: Aliye Sultan; Şehzade Ahmed; Nazime Sultan; Şehzade Mehmed Burhaneddin
Names
- Turkish: Hatice Nükhetsezâ Hanım; Ottoman Turkish: نكهت سزا خانم
- House: Ottoman (by marriage)
- Father: Baras Hatuğ Bey
- Mother: Ferhunde Hanim
- Religion: Sunni Islam

Hatice Nükhetseza Hanım (Ottoman Turkish: نكهت سزا خانم; "rich perfume"; 2 January 1827 – 15 May 1850) was a consort of Sultan Abdulmejid I of the Ottoman Empire.

== Life ==
Nükhetsezâ Hanım was born on 2 January 1827. She was the daughter of the Abkhazian nobleman Baras Hatuğ Bey and his wife, the Georgian Ferhune Hanim, and her real name was Hatice.

She grew up at court under the tutelage of Bezmiâlem Sultan, mother of Abdülmecid I, where she took the name of Nükhetseza. She was an excellent singer and a good painter and pianist.

She married Abdulmejid on 21 October 1841, who had fallen in love with her after hearing her sing, and was given the title of "Second Ikbal". In 1842 she give birth to her first child, a daughter, Aliye Sultan, who died the same year. In 1845, she was given the title of "BaşIkbal" (First Ikbal). A year after the marriage, on 5 June 1846, she gave birth to her second child, a son, Şehzade Ahmed, in the Old Çırağan Palace. The prince died the next day on 6 June 1846. In June 1846, the French Ambassador, François-Adolphe de Bourqueney, noted that Abdulmejid, who had been away on his trip to Rumelia was interrupted suddenly, and had to return urgently to console his favorite who just had an "unhappy childbirth".

A year later, on 27 November 1847, she gave birth to her third child, a daughter, Fatma Nazime Sultan, in the Old Beylerbeyi Palace. The princess died five days later on 1 December 1847. A year later, on 23 May 1849, she gave birth to her fourth and last child, a son, Şehzade Mehmed Burhaneddin in the Old Beylerbeyi Palace. Burhaneddin was her only child to survive beyond infancy.

== Death ==
Nükhetsezâ died on 15 May 1850 of tuberculosis, and was buried in the mausoleum of the imperial ladies at the Yeni Mosque, Istanbul. After her death, her son Mehmed was adopted by Neverser Hanim, another consort of Abdülmejid who had no children.

== Issue ==
Name	Birth	Death	Notes
Aliye Sultan	1842	1842	born in Çırağan Palace; buried in New Mosque
Şehzade Ahmed	5 June 1846	6 June 1846	born in Çırağan Palace; buried in New Mosque
Fatma Nazime Sultan	26 November 1847	1 December 1847	born in Beylerbeyi Palace; buried in New Mosque
Şehzaden Mehmed Burhaneddin	23 May 1849	4 November 1876	After his mother's death he was adopted by Neverser Hanim. He married thrice and had a son and a daughter

== In literature ==
- Nükhetsezâ is a character in Hıfzı Topuz's historical novel Abdülmecit: İmparatorluk Çökerken Sarayda 22 Yıl: Roman (2009).

== See also ==
- Ikbal (title)
- Ottoman Imperial Harem
- List of consorts of the Ottoman sultans

== Sources ==
- Uluçay, M. Çağatay (2011). Padişahların kadınları ve kızları. Ötüken. ISBN 978-9-754-37840-5.
- Sakaoğlu, Necdet (2008). Bu Mülkün Kadın Sultanları: Vâlide Sultanlar, Hâtunlar, Hasekiler, Kadınefendiler, Sultanefendiler. Oğlak Yayıncılık. ISBN 978-6-051-71079-2.
- Paşa, Ahmed Cevdet (1960). Tezâkir. [2]. 13 - 20, Volume 2. Türk Tarih Kurumu Basımevi.
- Brookes, Douglas Scott (2010). The Concubine, the Princess, and the Teacher: Voices from the Ottoman Harem. University of Texas Press. ISBN 978-0-292-78335-5.
