= Ayşe Sultan (daughter of Abdul Hamid II) =

Ottoman princess, daughter of Abdul Hamid II (1887–1960)

Hamide Ayşe Sultan
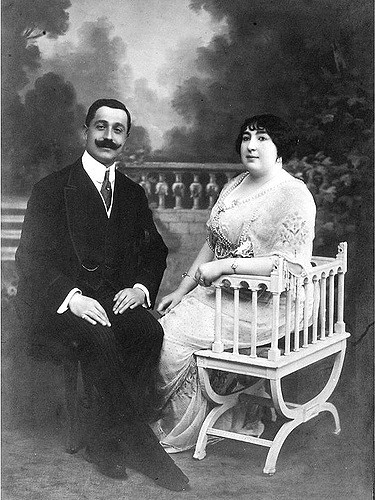
- Ayşe Sultan with her husband
- Born: 15 November 1887; Yıldız Palace, Constantinople, Ottoman Empire
- Died: 10 August 1960 (aged 72); Serencebey Yokuşu no. 53, Yıldız, Istanbul, Turkey
- Burial: Yahya Efendi Cemetery, Istanbul
- Spouse: Damat Ahmed Nami Bey (m. 1910; div. 1921); Damat Yarbay Mehmed Ali Bey (m. 1921; died 1937)
- Issue: first marriage; Sultanzade Ömer Nami Bey; Aliye Namiye Hanımsultan; Sultanzade Osman Nami Bey; second marriage; Sultanzade Abdülhamid Rauf Bey
Names
- Turkish: Hamide Ayşe Sultan; Ottoman Turkish: حمیدہ عائشه سلطان
- Dynasty: Ottoman
- Father: Abdul Hamid II
- Mother: Müşfika Kadın
- Religion: Sunni Islam

Hamide Ayşe Sultan (Ottoman Turkish: حمیدہ عائشه سلطان; also known as Ayşe Osmanoğlu; 15 November 1887 – 10 August 1960) was an Ottoman princess, the daughter of Sultan Abdul Hamid II and Müşfika Kadın.

== Early life and education ==
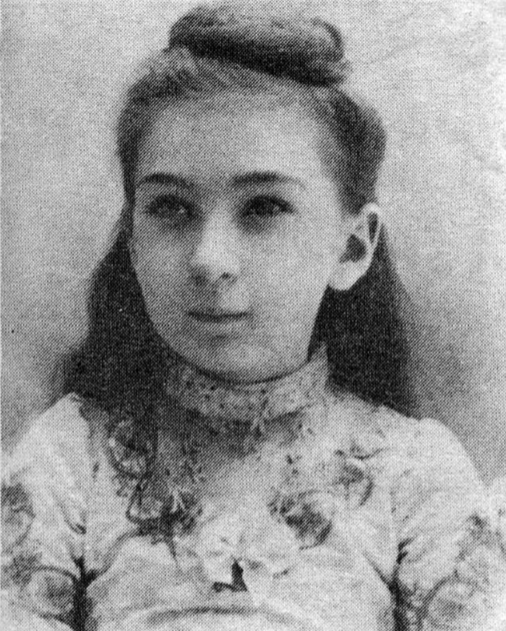
Ayşe Sultan in 1899, aged twelve

Ayşe Sultan was born on 31 October 1887 in the Yıldız Palace. Her father was Sultan Abdul Hamid II, son of Sultan Abdulmejid I and Tirimüjgan Kadın. Her mother was Müşfika Kadın, daughter of Gazi Şehid Ağır Mahmud Bey and Emine Hanım. She was the only child of her mother.

Ayşe's education took place in a study room in the Lesser Chancellery of the Yıldız Palace, together with her elder half-sister Şadiye Sultan. Their instructors were the privy secretary Hasib Efendi and the Private Enciphering Secretary Kâmil Efendi. Hasib Efendi would give lessons in the Quran, Arabic, and Persian, while Kâmil Efendi was to teach Turkish reading and writing, Ottoman grammar, arithmetic, history, and geography.

Ayşe took her piano lessons from the hazinedar Dürrüyekta (who later became the wife of her eldest half-brother Şehzade Mehmed Selim). She was herself the student of François Lombardi (1865–1904), who had been hired as instructor to the Imperial Corps of Music and from whom Ayşe also took lessons once a week. She learned how to play the Hamidiye March (the anthem of the Ottoman Empire) and also composed lullabies.

== First marriage ==
Ayşe Sultan was bethrothed to Ahmad Nami Bey, son of Fahri Bey, in 1908 during the last year of her father's reign. However, when her father was dethroned in 1909, the princess followed her parents into exile at Thessaloniki. The next year she returned to Istanbul.

The marriage took place in June 1910 in the Dolmabahçe Palace, together with her half-sister Refia Sultan. The marriage ceremony was performed by Şeyhülislam Musa Kazım Efendi. The wedding reception took place two months later on 9 August 1910 in the Bebek Palace. He became a Damat.

The couple's first child, a son, Sultanzade Ömer Nami Bey was born on 19 November 1911 in the Bebek Palace. He was followed by Aliye Namiye Hanımsultan born on 7 February 1913, who died at the age of two months on 9 April 1913. Before her father's death, Ayşe went to Switzerland, where the couple's third child, a son, Sultanzade Osman Nami Bey was born on 13 January 1918 in Geneva.

== Divorce and second marriage ==
Ayşe Sultan and her husband divorced in 1921, when the princess met Colonel Yarbay Mehmed Ali Bey, son of Rauf Pasha, at a reception at Dolmabahçe Palace. The two fell in love and he left his wife and children to marry her. The first-born son wrote in his memoirs that, upon receiving the news, his mother could not stop crying. They married on 3 April 1921 in the Nişantaşı Palace. He became a Damat. The two together had one son, Sultanzade Abdülhamid Rauf Bey, born in 1921. Upon the exile of the imperial family in March 1924, Ayşe, her husband and children settled in France, Paris, near Versailles. She was widowed at her husband's death in 1937. Ayşe said her husband died because of nostalgia. Her mother, on the other hand, chose to remain in Turkey, so that the two did not see one another for some 28 years, until the princess's return from exile in 1952. Because of the Surname Law, she took the name Ayşe Osmanoğlu.

== Memoirs ==
Ayşe Sultan wrote her memoir in Istanbul after her return from exile, completing it by 1955. Ayşe, for large portions of the memoir, relied on the memory of her mother, as the two lived together the princess's return to Turkey. The work was originally serialized in the Turkish popular magazine Hayat in the late 1950s, followed by its publication as a book in Istanbul in 1960, shortly before the princess's death. The fact that the memoir was written as a magazine serial accounts for its format. She wrote under the name Ayşe Osmanoğlu

At its publication, the major attraction of the book lay in the princess's recollections of her famous parent. Recognizing this, she titled her memoir Babam Sultan Abdülhamid (Turkish for "My Father, Sultan Abdul Hamid"). In it she crafted a personal view of Abdul Hamid, the man, the father, a kind of personal vindication to counteract what she saw as the distorted public image of the controversial ruler whose 33-year reign ended in dethronement and vilification.

== Death ==
Ayşe Sultan died on 10 August 1960 at the Serencebey Yokuşu, at the age of 72, and was buried in the imperial mausoleum at the Yahya Efendi dervish convent, adjacent to Yıldız Palace. Her mother survived her by nearly a year, dying in 1961.

== Honours ==
- Iftikhar Sanayi Medal in Gold, 1897
- Order of the House of Osman
- Order of the Medjidie, Jeweled
- Order of Charity, 1st Class
- Liakat Medal in Gold
- Hicaz Demiryolu Medal in Gold

== Issue ==
From her first marriage, Ayşe Sultan had two sons and a daughter:

- Sultanzade Omer Nami Bey then Nami-Osmanoğlu (Bebek Palace, 19 November 1911 - Lausanne, 17 March 1993). He had two wives, Saadet Said Kamil (21 September 1907 - Beirut, 13 August 1974), daughter of Said Kamil Bey and Fehime Fakhri Hanim, and Yolande Saad, married on 10 November 1975 in Istanbul, without issue, and one daughter:
  - Ayşe Rebia Nami-Osmanoğlu (b. 3 August 1945), unmarried and without issue
- Aliye Namiye Hanımsultan (7 February 1913 - 9 April 1913). She died in infancy and was buried in mausoleum of Şehzade Ahmed Kemaleddin, Yayha Efendi cemetery.
- Sultanzade Osman Nami Bey then Nami-Osmanoğlu (Geneva, 13 January 1918 - Istanbul, 15 July 2010). Buried in the mausoleum of Mahmud II. He married twice, to Adile Tanyeri (? - Tunis, 8 August 1958) on 18 January 1946, and to Rothraud Granzow (Hoya Vesser, 9 April 1934) on 18 July 1959, and had five daughters:
  - Mediha Şükriye Nami-Osmanoğlu (b. 24 May 1947). She married ... Conopio and has one daughter:
    - Ayşe Marie-Christine Nami-Conopio (b. 16 July 1969)
  - Fethiye Nimet Nami-Osmanoğlu (b. 21 March 1957), unmarried and without issue
  - Ayşe Adile Nami-Osmanoğlu (b. 6 August 1958). She married ... Ariba and has one son and one daughter:
    - Osman Necati Ferhat Ariba (b. 31 January 1980)
    - Ayşe Feyzan Ariba (b. 9 September 1983)
  - Gül Nür Dorothée Nami-Osmanoğlu (b. 10 January 1960). She married ... Ragot and has one son and two daughters:
    - Hanzade Audrey Nami-Ragot (b. 4 February 1988)
    - Ayzade Maylis Nami-Ragot (b. 16 June 1991)
    - Aléxis Cem Nami-Ragot (b. 11 March 1993)
  - Ayten Sofia Nami-Osmanoğlu (b. 24 March 1961). She married ... Kunter and has one daughter:
    - Refia Roksan Kunter (b. 8 October 1984)

From her second marriage, Ayşe Sultan had one son:

- Sultanzade Abdülhamid Rauf Bey (October 1921 - 11 March 1981). Buried in Yayha Efendi Cemetery.

== In popular culture ==
- In the 2002 film Abdülhamid Düşerken, Ayşe Sultan is portrayed by Turkish actress Selin Demiratar.
- In the 2011 TV series Kirli Oyunlar, Ayşe Sultan is portrayed by Turkish actress Sıla Çetindağ.

== See also ==
- List of Ottoman princesses

== Sources ==
- Brookes, Douglas Scott (2010). The Concubine, the Princess, and the Teacher: Voices from the Ottoman Harem. University of Texas Press. ISBN 978-0-292-78335-5.
- Sakaoğlu, Necdet (2008). Bu mülkün kadın sultanları: Vâlide sultanlar, hâtunlar, hasekiler, kadınefendiler, sultanefendiler. Oğlak Yayıncılık. ISBN 978-9-753-29623-6.
- Uluçay, Mustafa Çağatay (2011). Padişahların kadınları ve kızları. Ankara: Ötüken. ISBN 978-9-754-37840-5.
