= Mezidemestan Kadın =

Sixth Consort of Ottoman Sultan Abdul Hamid II (c.1869–1909)

- Born: Kadriye Kamile Merve Mikanba; 3 March 1869; Ganja
- Died: 21 January 1909 (aged 39); Yıldız Palace, Constantinople, Ottoman Empire (modern-day Istanbul, Turkey)
- Burial: Yahya Efendi Cemetery, Istanbul
- Spouse: Abdul Hamid II (m. 1885)
- Issue: Şehzade Mehmed Burhaneddin
Names
- Turkish: Mezidemestan Kadin; Ottoman Turkish: مزیدمستان قادین
- House: Mikanba (by birth); Ottoman (by marriage)
- Father: Kaymat Bey Mikanba
- Religion: Sunni Islam

Mezidemestan Kadın (Ottoman Turkish: مزیدمستان قادین, "merry woman", also Mezide Kadın; born Kadriye Kamile Merve Mikanba; 3 March 1869 – 21 January 1909) was the sixth consort of Sultan Abdul Hamid II of the Ottoman Empire.

== Early life ==
Mezidemestan Kadın was born in 1869, as Kadriye Kamile Merve Mikanba. She was a member of Abkhazian noble family Mikanba. Her father was Kaymat Bey Mikanba. She had been brought to Istanbul when she was young, where she was entrusted to the entourage of Sultan Murad V, Abdülhamid II's older half-brother. Here her name according to the custom of the Ottoman court was changed to Mezidemestan. She was known for her extreme shyness. Emine Nazikeda Hanım, who became consort of Sultan Mehmed VI, Abdülhamid II's younger half-brother, was her niece.

== Marriage ==
Mezidimestan married Abdul Hamid on 2 February 1885 at the Yıldız Palace. She was given the title of "Fifth Kadın". On 19 December 1885, after ten months of the wedding, she gave birth to her only son, Şehzade Mehmed Burhaneddin. Mehmed Burhaneddin was the most favourite son of Abdul Hamid. As the mother of the sultan's favourite son she was very influential but never abused her position; instead, she was known for helping everyone and even her step-children loved her.

In 1895, she was elevated to the title of "Fourth Kadın", and in 1901, she was elevated to the title of "Third Kadın". Abdul Hamid had presented her a villa located on the grounds of Yıldız Palace.

== Death ==
Mezidimestan Kadın died of stomach cancer in Yıldız Palace, on 21 January 1909, aged 39. She was buried in Yahya Efendi Cemetery, Istanbul.

== Issue ==
Name	Birth	Death	Notes
Şehzade Mehmed Burhaneddin	19 December 1885	15 June 1949	married four times, and had issue, two sons

== See also ==
- Kadın (title)
- Ottoman Imperial Harem
- List of consorts of the Ottoman sultans

== Sources ==
- Açba, Leyla (2004). Bir Çerkes prensesinin harem hatıraları. L & M. ISBN 978-9-756-49131-7.
- Brookes, Douglas Scott (2010). The Concubine, the Princess, and the Teacher: Voices from the Ottoman Harem. University of Texas Press. ISBN 978-0-292-78335-5.
- Osmanoğlu, Ayşe (2000). Babam Sultan Abdülhamid. Mona Kitap Yayinlari. ISBN 978-6-050-81202-2.
- Sakaoğlu, Necdet (2008). Bu Mülkün Kadın Sultanları: Vâlide Sultanlar, Hâtunlar, Hasekiler, Kandınefendiler, Sultanefendiler. Oğlak Yayıncılık. ISBN 978-6-051-71079-2.
- Uluçay, M. Çağatay (2011). Padişahların kadınları ve kızları. Ötüken. ISBN 978-975-437-840-5.
