= Şehzade Mehmed Burhaneddin (son of Abdulmejid I) =

Ottoman prince (1849–1876)

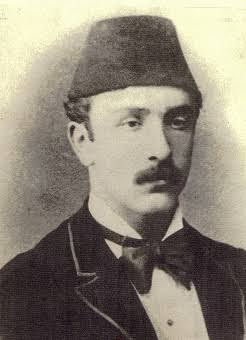
- Born: 23 May 1849; Old Beylerbeyi Palace, Constantinople, Ottoman Empire
- Died: 4 November 1876 (aged 27); Dolmabahçe Palace, Constantinople, Ottoman Empire
- Burial: Abdulmejid I Mausoleum, Yavuz Selim Mosque, Istanbul
- Spouse: Mestinaz Hanım (m. 1872) Şadruh Hanım (m. 1873): Aşkıdilber Hanım
- Issue: Şehzade Ibrahim Tevfik; Fülane Sultan
Names
- Turkish: Şehzade Mehmed Burhaneddin; Ottoman Turkish: شهزادہ محمد برهان الدین
- House: Ottoman
- Father: Abdulmejid I
- Mother: Biological; Nükhetsezâ Hanım; Adopted; Neverser Hanim
- Religion: Sunni Islam

Şehzade Mehmed Burhaneddin Efendi (Ottoman Turkish: شهزادہ محمد برهان الدین; 23 May 1849 – 4 November 1876) was an Ottoman prince, the son of Sultan Abdulmejid I and one of his consorts, Nükhetsezâ Hanım.

== Early life ==
Şehzade Mehmed Burhaneddin was born on 23 May 1849 in the Old Beylerbeyi Palace. His father was Sultan Abdulmejid I, son of Sultan Mahmud II and Bezmiâlem Sultan and his mother was Nükhetsezâ Hanım. He had an older full brother, Şehzade Ahmed, and two older full sisters, Aliye Sultan and Nazime Sultan, all of whom died as newborn. After his mother's death in 1850, when he was one year old, he was adopted by another of his father's consorts, Neverser Hanim, who had no children of her own. He was circumcised on 9 April 1857 in the Dolmabahçe Palace, together with his brothers Şehzade Mehmed Reşad (future Mehmed V), Şehzade Ahmed Kemaleddin and Şehzade Ahmed Nureddin.

== Personal life ==
Burhaneddin married three times and had one son. One of his wives was Mestinaz Hanım. She was born on 20 September 1851 in Tbilisi, Georgia. They married on 4 May 1872 in the Dolmabahçe Palace. In 1874, she gave birth to Şehzade Ibrahim Tevfik. Two years later she gave birth to a daughter. She died on 20 April 1909 in the Dolmabahçe Palace, and was buried in Yavuz Selim Mosque. Another wife was Şadruh Hanım. They married in 1873. She died in 1930. Another wife was Aşkıdilber Hanım.

In widowhood, Mestinaz, Şadruh and Aşkıdilber received a pension of 10,000 kuruş, 2880 kuruş, and 4000 kuruş respectively. In 1909, Şadruh's and Aşkıdilber's pension was raised to 10,000 kuruş each.

He owned a villa in Üsküdar. The villa was built in 1860, and was located on a hill between the Tophanelioğlu-Kısıklı road and the Bosphorus Bridge ring road.

== Later life and death ==
Sultan Abdul Hamid II trusted Burhaneddin. During his reign, he had tightened the security ring around the Çırağan Palace, where Murad V and his family were confined. Access to the palace was so severely curtailed that visitors were practically limited to the princes, such as Burhaneddin and Mehmed Reşad.

Burhaneddin died of tuberculosis at the age of twenty-seven on 4 November 1876, and was buried in the mausoleum of his father in Yavuz Selim Mosque, Istanbul. His brother, Abdul Hamid, named a battleship and one of his sons after him. He also brought up Burhaneddin's son in his care.

== Issue ==
Name	Birth	Death	Notes
By Mestinaz Hanım (married 4 May 1872; 20 September 1851 – 20 April 1909)
Şehzade Ibrahim Tevfik	6 November 1874	31 December 1931	born in Dolmabahçe Palace; married five times and had two sons and five daughters; died in exile in Nice, France;
(Fülane) Sultan	1876	1890	born and died in Istanbul; her name is unknown

== Source ==
- Brookes, Douglas Scott (January 10, 2010). The Concubine, the Princess, and the Teacher: Voices from the Ottoman Harem. University of Texas Press. ISBN 978-0-292-78335-5.
