= List of Ottoman princesses =

Sultan (Ottoman Turkish:سلطان) and Hatun (Mongolian: ᠬᠠᠲᠤᠨ хатан; Old Turkic: 𐰴𐰍𐰣, romanized: katun; Ottoman Turkish: خاتون, romanized: hatun or قادین romanized: kadın; Persian: خاتون khātūn; Chinese: 可敦; Hindi: ख़ातून romanized: khātūn) are the two imperial female titles that were given to Ottoman Princesses, daughters of Ottoman Sultans.

== Title and treatment ==
=== Titles ===
For the daughters of a sovereign Sultan or a daughter of a son of a sultan the titles that were used are:

- Lady (hatun, خاتون). Used before 16th century and also used for sultan's mothers and consorts.
  - Format style: "(given name) Hatun", i.e. Lady (given name)
- Sultana (sultan, سلطان). Used after 16th century. Formal title:
  - Short: "(given name) Sultan", i.e. Sultana (given name), with the style of sultanım (my sultan(a)) or efendim (my mistress).
  - Full: Devletlû İsmetlu (given name) Sultân Aliyyetü'ş-Şân Hazretleri

For the sons and daughters of sultana the titles that were used are:

For a son:

- Prince Sultan (sultanzade, سلطانزاده). Sons of sultanas (imperial princesses).
  - Formal title: "Sultanzade (given name) Bey-Efendi", i.e. Sir Prince Sultan (given name)

For a daughter:

- Sultana madam (hanımsultan, خانم سلطان). Daughters of sultanas (imperial princesses).
  - Formal title: "(given name) Hanımsultan", i.e. Sultana madam (given name)

=== Treatments ===
Before the 16th century, Ottoman imperial princesses and consorts of the Sultan held the same title after their given name, hatun, the Turkish form of the Mongolian title khatun (the feminine equivalent of khan). By the beginning of the 16th century, Bayezid II (1481-1512), once ascended to the throne, granted his daughters and granddaughters in the male line the title of "Sultan" and his granddaughters in the female line that of "Hanımsultan", which replaced the simple honorific "Hatun" in use until then. His grandsons in female line obtained instead the title of "Sultanzade". Bayezid's reform of female titles remains in effect today among the surviving members of the Ottoman dynasty. So ottoman princesses held the title of sultan after their given name. This usage underlines the Ottoman conception of sovereign power as family prerogative.

The formal way of addressing an Ottoman princess is Devletlû İsmetlu (given name) Sultân Aliyyetü'ş-Şân Hazretleri, i.e., Sultana (given name). The title of sons of princesses are sultanzade and daughters of princesses are hanimsultan. The title of the consorts of princesses are called damat, the princess also had the right never to consummate the marriage this is because they were often married even very young and sometimes even with older men. Sultana, a title which usually referred to female sultans relative to Westerners, does not exist in the Ottoman language. Nevertheless, westerners often translated their official title, sultan, to sultana, possibly to distinguish them from the Ottoman sovereign.

=== Example of imperial princesses (sultans) ===
- Mihrimah Sultan (21 March 1522 – 25 January 1578), daughter of Suleiman the Magnificent. She was the most powerful imperial princess in Ottoman history and one of the prominent figures during the Sultanate of Women. Her ability and power, and her running of the affairs of the harem in the same manner as the sultan's mother, resulted in Mihrimah being referred to as Valide Sultan for Selim II, although she was not called by this title on any historical record.
- Fatma Sultan (1605/1606 – after 1667), daughter of Ahmed I. She was known for her many political marriages.
- Ayşe Sultan (2 November 1887 – 10 August 1960), daughter of Abdülhamid II. She was known for publishing her memoirs by the name of Babam Sultan Abdülhamid in 1960.
- Ayşe Gülnev Sultan (born 17 January 1971), great-great-great-granddaughter of Murad V. She is a director of property investment and development companies, and writes and researches historical pieces on Ottoman history.

== Daughters of the Ottoman sultans ==
This is a list of Ottoman princesses, the daughters of the monarchs of the Ottoman Empire who ruled over the transcontinental empire from its inception in 1299 to its dissolution in 1922.

Name	Birth date/place	Parents		Spouse(s)	Children	Death date/place			
Name	Birth date/place	Mother	Father	Spouse(s)	Children	Death date/place			
Fatma Hatun	?	unknown	Osman I			?			
Fatma Hatun	?	Asporça Hatun	Orhan			?			
Hatice Hatun	?	unknown	Orhan	Süleyman Bey		?			
Selçuk Hatun	?	Asporça Hatun	Orhan			?			
Nefise Hatun	c. 1363	unknown	Murad I	Alaeddin Ali of Karaman (m. 1378)	Mehmed II of Karaman	c. 1400 (aged 36–37)			
Hundi Hatun	?	unknown	Bayezid I	Emir Sultan	a daughter	?			
Erhondu Hatun	?	unknown	Bayezid I	Yakub Bey	Umur Bey	?			
Fatma Hatun	?		Bayezid I			?			
Oruz Hatun	?	Olivera Despina	Bayezid I		Ayşe	?			
a daughter	?	Olivera Despina	Bayezid I	Abu Bakar Mirza		?			
Paşa Melek Hatun	?	Olivera Despina	Bayezid I	Şemseddin Mehmed		?			
Selçuk Hatun	c. 1407; Amasya or Merzifon, Ottoman Empire	Kumru Hatun	Mehmed I	Damat Taceddin Ibrahim II Bey (m. 1425; died 1443)	Orhan Bey; Paşa Melek Hatun; Emir Yusuf Bey; Hafsa Hatun; Hatice Hatun; Ishak Bali; Hundi Hatun	25 October 1485 (aged 77–78); Bursa, Ottoman Empire			
Selçuk Hatun	c. 1407; Amasya or Merzifon, Ottoman Empire	Kumru Hatun	Mehmed I	Anadolu Baylerbeyi Karaca Pasha (m. 1443; died 1444)	Orhan Bey; Paşa Melek Hatun; Emir Yusuf Bey; Hafsa Hatun; Hatice Hatun; Ishak Bali; Hundi Hatun	25 October 1485 (aged 77–78); Bursa, Ottoman Empire			
Sultan Hatun	?	unknown	Mehmed I	Damat Kasim Bey (died 1464)		1444			
Hatice Hatun	?	unknown	Mehmed I	Damat Karaca Pasha (died 10 November 1444)		?			
Hafsa Hatun	?	unknown	Mehmed I	Damat Mahmud Bey (died January 1444)		?			
İlaldi Hatun	?	unknown	Mehmed I	Damat Ibrahim II Bey (died 16 July 1464)		?			
a daughter	?	unknown	Mehmed I	Damat Isa Bey (died 1437)		?			
Ayşe Hatun	?	unknown	Mehmed I			?			
Sitti Hatun	?	unknown	Mehmed I			?			
a daughter	?	unknown	Mehmed I	Damat Alaattin Ali Bey		?			
Erhundu Hatun	?	unknown	Murad II	Damat Yakup Bey		?			
Şehzade Hatun	?	unknown	Murad II	Beylerbeyi Sinan Bey		c. 1480			
Fatma Hatun	?	unknown	Murad II			?			
Hatice Hatun	?	unknown	Murad II	Damat Isa Bey		?			
Gevherhan Hatun	c. 1446	Gülbahar Hatun	Mehmed II	Ughurlu Muhammad (m. 1474; died 1477)	Göde Ahmed	c. 1513; Istanbul, Ottoman Empire			
Ayşe Hatun	?	unknown	Mehmed II	Hasan Bey		?			
Aynışah Sultan	Amasya, Ottoman Empire	Şirin Hatun	Bayezid II	Göde Ahmed Bey (m. 1489; died 1497)	Sultanzade Zeyneddin Bey; Hanzade Hanimsultan; Neslihan Hanimsultan	Bursa, Ottoman Empire			
Aynışah Sultan	Amasya, Ottoman Empire	Şirin Hatun	Bayezid II	Yahya Pasha (m. 1500; died 1511)		Bursa, Ottoman Empire			
Hatice Sultan	c. 1463; Amasya, Ottoman Empire	Bülbül Hatun	Bayezid II	Muderis Kara Mustafa Pasha (m. 1479; died 1483)	Sultanzade Ahmed Bey; Hanzade Hanimsultan	c. 1500 (aged 36–37); Bursa, Ottoman Empire			
Hatice Sultan	c. 1463; Amasya, Ottoman Empire	Bülbül Hatun	Bayezid II	Faik Pasha (m. 1484; died 1499)		c. 1500 (aged 36–37); Bursa, Ottoman Empire			
Hundi Sultan	c. 1464; Amasya, Ottoman Empire	Bülbül Hatun	Bayezid II	Hersekzade Ahmed Pasha (m. 1484)	Sultanzade Musa Bey; Sultanzade Mustafa Bey; Kamerşah Hanimsultan; Hümaşah Hanimsultan	c. 1511 (aged 46–47); Bursa, Ottoman Empire			
Ayşe Sultan	1465; Amasya, Ottoman Empire	Nigar Hatun	Bayezid II	Güveyi Sinan Pasha	Ahmed Bey; Gevherşah Sultan; Kamerşah Sultan; Fatma Sultan; Mihrihan Sultan	c. 1515 (aged 49–50); Istanbul, Ottoman Empire			
Hümaşah Sultan	c. 1466; Amasya, Ottoman Empire	unknown	Bayezid II	Bali Pasha (m. 1482; died 1495)	Sultanzade Ahmed Bey; Sultanzade Mehmed Bey	before 1520			
Hümaşah Sultan	c. 1466; Amasya, Ottoman Empire	unknown	Bayezid II	Malkoçoğlu Yahya Pasha	Bali Bey (adoptive)	before 1520			
Ilaldi Sultan	c. 1467; Amasya, Ottoman Empire	unknown	Bayezid II	Hain Ahmed Pasha	Sultanzade Koçî Bey; Şahzade Aynışah Hanimsultan	c. 1517 (aged 49–50)			
Gevhermüluk Sultan	c. 1467; Amasya, Ottoman Empire	unknown	Bayezid II	Dukakinzade Mehmed Pasha	Sultanzade Mehmed Ahmed Bey; Neslişah Hanımsultan	20 January 1550 (aged 82–83); Istanbul, Ottoman Empire			
Sofu Fatma Sultan	c. 1468; Amasya, Ottoman Empire	Nigar Hatun	Bayezid II	Isfendiyaroglu Mirza Mehmed Pasha (m. 1480, divorced)	Sultanzade Isfendiyaroglu Mehmed Pasha	Bursa, after 1520			
Sofu Fatma Sultan	c. 1468; Amasya, Ottoman Empire	Nigar Hatun	Bayezid II	Mustafa Pasha (m. 1489; died 1503)		Bursa, after 1520			
Sofu Fatma Sultan	c. 1468; Amasya, Ottoman Empire	Nigar Hatun	Bayezid II	Güzelce Hasan Bey (m. 1504)	Sultanzade Haci Ahmed Bey; Sultanzade Mehmed Celebi; a daughter	Bursa, after 1520			
Selçuk Sultan	c. 1469; Amasya, Ottoman Empire	unknown	Bayezid II	Ferhad Bey (m. 1584, died)	Sultanzade Gaazî Husrev Paşah (1484 – 18 June 1541); Neslişah Hanımsultan (1486–1550)	c. 1508 (aged 38–39)			
Selçuk Sultan	c. 1469; Amasya, Ottoman Empire	unknown	Bayezid II	Mehmed Bey (m. 1587, died)	Hanzade Hanimsultan; Fülane Hanımsultan; Aslihan Hanımsultan	c. 1508 (aged 38–39)			
Sultanzade Sultan	before 1474, Amasya	Hüsnüşah Hatun	Bayezid II			?			
Şah Sultan	1474 Amasya		Bayezid II	Nasuh Bey (m. 1490, died)	a daughter	after 1506			
Kamerşah Sultan	1476 Amasya	Gülruh Hatun	Bayezid II	Koca Mustafa Pasha (m. 1491; died 1512)	Hundi Hanimsultan; Sultanzade Osman Bey	January 1520 Costantinople			
Kamerşah Sultan	1476 Amasya	Gülruh Hatun	Bayezid II	Nişancı Kara Davud Pasha		January 1520 Costantinople			
Şahzade Sultan	Amasya, Ottoman Empire	unknown	Bayezid II	Yahya Pasha (m. 1501)	Sultanzade Yahyapaşazade Gaazi Küçük Bali Pasha; Sultanzade Gaazi Koca Mehmed Pasha; Sultanzade Gaazi Ahmed	1520			
Fatma Sultan	c. 1492; Trabzon, Ottoman Empire	Hafsa Sultan	Selim I	Mustafa Pasha (m. 1516; div. 1520)		c. 1556 Istanbul, Ottoman Empire			
Fatma Sultan	c. 1492; Trabzon, Ottoman Empire	Hafsa Sultan	Selim I	Kara Ahmed Pasha (m. 1522; died 1555)	two daughters (disputed)	c. 1556 Istanbul, Ottoman Empire			
Fatma Sultan	c. 1492; Trabzon, Ottoman Empire	Hafsa Sultan	Selim I	Hadim Ibrahim Pasha (m. 1555)		c. 1556 Istanbul, Ottoman Empire			
Hatice Sultan	before 1494; Trabzon, Ottoman Empire	Hafsa Sultan	Selim I	Kapudan Iskender Pasha (m. 1509; died 1515)	Hanım Sultan	1543/44; Istanbul, Ottoman Empire			
Hatice Sultan	before 1494; Trabzon, Ottoman Empire	Hafsa Sultan	Selim I	Çoban Mustafa Pasha		1543/44; Istanbul, Ottoman Empire			
Hafize Sultan	1493 or before Trabzon, Ottoman Empire	Hafsa Sultan?	Selim I	Dukaginzade Ahmed Pasha (m. 1511; died 1515)		July 10, 1538 Costantinople			
Hafize Sultan	1493 or before Trabzon, Ottoman Empire	Hafsa Sultan?	Selim I	Boşnak Mustafa Pasha (m. 1522, died)	Sultanzade Kara Osman Şah Pasha	July 10, 1538 Costantinople			
Şah Sultan	c. 1500; Manisa, Turkey	Ayşe Hatun	Selim I	Lütfi Pasha (m. 1523; div. 1541)	Esmehan Hanımsultan	1572 (aged 71–72); Istanbul, Turkey			
Beyhan Sultan	c. 1497; Trabzon, Ottoman Empire	Ayşe Hatun	Selim I	Ferhat Pasha (m. 1513; died 1524)	Esmihan Hanimsultan	1559; Istanbul, Ottoman Empire			
Beyhan Sultan	c. 1497; Trabzon, Ottoman Empire	Ayşe Hatun	Selim I	Mehmed Pasha (m. 1524)	Esmihan Hanimsultan	1559; Istanbul, Ottoman Empire			
Gevherhan Sultan	?	unknown	Selim I	Sultanzade Isfendiyaroglu Mehmed Bey (m. 1509; died 1514)		?			
Gevherhan Sultan	?	unknown	Selim I	Saadet I Giray?	Ahmed Pasha	?			
Şahzade Sultan	?	unknown	Selim I	Çoban Mustafa Pasha	Ayşe Hanimsultan	?			
Yenişah Sultan	?	unknown	Selim I	Koca Sinan Pasha?	Emine Hanimsultan; Sultanzade Mehmed Pasha	?			
Yenişah Sultan	?	unknown	Selim I	Güzelce Mahmud Paşa		?			
Kamerşah Sultan	?	unknown	Selim I			27 September 1503 in Trabzon			
Hanim Sultan	?	unknown	Selim I	Koca Sinan Pasha?	Emine Hanimsultan; Sultanzade Mehmed Pasha	?			
Hanim Sultan	?	unknown	Selim I	Güzelce Mahmud Paşa		?			
Raziye Sultan	c. 1517 Istanbul, Ottoman Empire	unknown	Suleiman I			1520 (aged 2–3) Istanbul			
Mihrimah Sultan	c. 1522; Istanbul, Ottoman Empire	Hurrem Sultan	Suleiman I	Rüstem Pasha (m. 1539; died 1561)	Ayşe Hümaşah Sultan; Sultanzade Osman Bey	25 January 1578 (aged 55–56); Istanbul, Ottoman Empire			
Şah Sultan	c. 1543; Manisa, Ottoman Empire	Nurbanu Sultan	Selim II	Çakırcıbaşı Hasan Pasha (m. 1562; died 1574)		3 November 1577 (aged 32–33); Istanbul, Ottoman Empire			
Şah Sultan	c. 1543; Manisa, Ottoman Empire	Nurbanu Sultan	Selim II	Zal Mahmud Pasha (m. 1575; died 1577)	Sultanzade Köse; Hüsrev Bey; Fülane Hanımsultan	3 November 1577 (aged 32–33); Istanbul, Ottoman Empire			
Gevherhan Sultan	c. 1544; Manisa, Ottoman Empire	Nurbanu Sultan	Selim II	Piyale Pasha (m. 1562; died 1578)	Mustafa Bey; Atike Sultan; Fatma Sultan; Hatice Sultan; Salih Bey	fl. 1622; Istanbul, Ottoman Empire			
Gevherhan Sultan	c. 1544; Manisa, Ottoman Empire	Nurbanu Sultan	Selim II	Cerrah Mehmed Pasha (m. 1579; died 1604)		fl. 1622; Istanbul, Ottoman Empire			
Ismihan Sultan	1545; Manisa, Ottoman Empire	Nurbanu Sultan	Selim II	Sokollu Mehmed Pasha (m. 1562; died 1579)	Safiye Hanımsultan; Sultanzade Ahmed Bey; Sultanzade Sokolluzade Ibrahim Paşah; Sultanzade Piri Mehmed Bey	8 August 1585 (aged 39–40); Istanbul, Ottoman Empire			
Ismihan Sultan	1545; Manisa, Ottoman Empire	Nurbanu Sultan	Selim II	Kalaylıkoz Ali Pasha (m. 1584)	Sultanzade Mahmud Bey	8 August 1585 (aged 39–40); Istanbul, Ottoman Empire			
Fatma Sultan	c. 1559; Karaman Eyalet, Ottoman Empire	unknown	Selim II	Kanijeli Siyavuş Pasha (m. 1574)	Sultanzade Ahmed Bey; Sultanzade Mustafa Paşah; Sultanzade Abdulkaadir Bey; Sultanzade Süleyman Bey; Fülane Hanımsultan (stillbirth)	October 1580 (aged 20–21); Istanbul, Ottoman Empire			
Hümaşah Sultan	c. 1564; Manisa, Ottoman Empire	Safiye Sultan	Murad III	Nişar Mustafazade Mehmed Pasha (m. 1582; died 1586)		1648; Istanbul, Ottoman Empire			
Hümaşah Sultan	c. 1564; Manisa, Ottoman Empire	Safiye Sultan	Murad III	Serdar Ferhad Pasha (m. 1591; died 1595)		1648; Istanbul, Ottoman Empire			
Ayşe Sultan	c. 1565; Manisa, Ottoman Empire	Safiye Sultan	Murad III	Ibrahim Pasha (m. 1586; died 1601)	Sultanzade Mehmed Bey; Fülane Hanimsultan	15 May 1605 (aged 39–40); Istanbul, Ottoman Empire			
Ayşe Sultan	c. 1565; Manisa, Ottoman Empire	Safiye Sultan	Murad III	Yemişçi Hasan Pasha (m. 1602; died 1603)		15 May 1605 (aged 39–40); Istanbul, Ottoman Empire			
Ayşe Sultan	c. 1565; Manisa, Ottoman Empire	Safiye Sultan	Murad III	Güzelce Mahmud Pasha (m. 1604)		15 May 1605 (aged 39–40); Istanbul, Ottoman Empire			
Fatma Sultan	c. 1573; Manisa, Ottoman Empire	Safiye Sultan	Murad III	Halil Pasha (m. 1593; died 1603)	Sultanzade Mahmud Bey (1595–1598); Sultanzade Hasan Bey (? – after 1620)	1620 (aged 46–47); Istanbul, Ottoman Empire			
Fatma Sultan	c. 1573; Manisa, Ottoman Empire	Safiye Sultan	Murad III	Cafer Pasha (m. 1604; died 1609)		1620 (aged 46–47); Istanbul, Ottoman Empire			
Fatma Sultan	c. 1573; Manisa, Ottoman Empire	Safiye Sultan	Murad III	Hizir Pasha (m. 1610; died 1610)		1620 (aged 46–47); Istanbul, Ottoman Empire			
Mihrimah Sultan	1578 or 1579; Istanbul, Turkey	Safiye Sultan	Murad III	Safiye Sultan?	Mirahur Ahmed Pasha (m. 1613; died 1618); Mehmed Ali Pasha (m. 1618; died 1625)		after 1625; Istanbul, Turkey		
Sofu Bayram (m. 1619; died 1627)	1578 or 1579; Istanbul, Turkey		Murad III						
Fahriye Sultan	c. 1594 Constantinople, Ottoman Empire	unknown	Murad III	Çuhadar Ahmed Pasha (m. 1604; died 1618)		16 November 1678 (aged 83–84); Constantinople, Ottoman Empire			
Fahriye Sultan	c. 1594 Constantinople, Ottoman Empire	unknown	Murad III	Rukiye Sultan	?	16 November 1678 (aged 83–84); Constantinople, Ottoman Empire	Şemsiruhsar Hatun	Damad Nakkaş Hasan Pasha (m. 1613)	?
Mihriban Sultan	?	unknown	Murad III	Damad Kapıcıbaşı Topal Mehmed Agha (m. 1613)		?			
Hatice Sultan	1583	unknown	Murad III	Sokolluzade Lala Mehmed Pasha (m. 1598, died)	two sons; a daughter	1648			
Hatice Sultan	1583	unknown	Murad III	Gürşci Mehmed Pasha (m. 1613)		1648			
Fethiye Sultan	?	unknown	Murad III			?			
Seventeen daughters	?	unknown	Murad III	two of them were married		1598 due to smallpox			
Four daughters	?	unknown	Murad III			before 1595			
Fatma Sultan	1584? Manisa, Ottoman Empire	Handan Sultan	Murad III	Mehmed III	Mahmud Pasha (m. 1600, died)		?		
Fatma Sultan	1584? Manisa, Ottoman Empire	Handan Sultan	Tiryaki Hasan Pasha (m. 1604; died 1611)	Mehmed III			?		
Fatma Sultan	1584? Manisa, Ottoman Empire	Handan Sultan	Güzelce Ali Pasha (m. 1616; died 1621)	Mehmed III			?		
Ayşe Sultan	c. 1587?	Handan Sultan	Destari Mustafa Pasha (died)	Mehmed III		after 1614			
Ayşe Sultan	c. 1587?	Handan Sultan	Gazi Hüsrev Pasha	Mehmed III		after 1614			
Hatice Sultan	1588? Manisa, Ottoman Empire	Halime Sultan	Damat Mirahur Pasha (m. 1604, died)	Mehmed III		1613 Costantinople, Ottoman Empire			
Hatice Sultan	1588? Manisa, Ottoman Empire	Halime Sultan	Sultanzade Mahmud Pasha (m. 1612)	Mehmed III		1613 Costantinople, Ottoman Empire			
Beyhan Sultan	before 1590 Manisa, Ottoman Empire	unknown	Damat Halil Pasha (m. 1612; died 1629)	Mehmed III	Sultanzade Mahmud Bey; Sultanzade Ebubekir Bey	after 1629			
Şah Sultan	1590? Manisa, Ottoman Empire	Halime Sultan	Kara Davud Pasha (m. 1604; died 1623)	Mehmed III	Sultanzade Süleyman Bey; a daughter	after 1623 Costantinople, Ottoman Empire			
Hümaşah Sultan	?	unknown	Cagaloglu Mahmud Pasha (m. 1612)	Mehmed III		?			
Esra Sultan	?	unknown	married after 1622	Mehmed III		?			
Ümmügülsüm Sultan	?	unknown	married after 1622	Mehmed III		after 1622			
Halime Sultan	?	unknown	married after 1622	Mehmed III		after 1622			
Akile Sultan	?	unknown	married after 1622	Mehmed III		after 1622			
Ayşe Sultan	c. 1605/08 Istanbul, Ottoman Empire	Kösem Sultan	Ahmed I	Gümülcineli Nasuh Pasha (1612–1614)		May 1657 (aged 48–52); Istanbul, Ottoman Empire			
Ayşe Sultan	c. 1605/08 Istanbul, Ottoman Empire	Kösem Sultan	Ahmed I	Damad Karakaş Mehmed Pasha (c.1620–1621)		May 1657 (aged 48–52); Istanbul, Ottoman Empire			
Ayşe Sultan	c. 1605/08 Istanbul, Ottoman Empire	Kösem Sultan	Ahmed I	Damad Hafız Ahmed Pasha (c. 1626–1632)	Sultanzade Mustafa Bey (1628–1670); Sultanzade (Fülan) Bey	May 1657 (aged 48–52); Istanbul, Ottoman Empire			
Ayşe Sultan	c. 1605/08 Istanbul, Ottoman Empire	Kösem Sultan	Ahmed I	Damad Murtaza Pasha (1635–1636)		May 1657 (aged 48–52); Istanbul, Ottoman Empire			
Ayşe Sultan	c. 1605/08 Istanbul, Ottoman Empire	Kösem Sultan	Ahmed I	Damad Ahmed Pasha (1639–1644)		May 1657 (aged 48–52); Istanbul, Ottoman Empire			
Ayşe Sultan	c. 1605/08 Istanbul, Ottoman Empire	Kösem Sultan	Ahmed I	Damad Voynuk Ahmed Pasha (1645–1649)		May 1657 (aged 48–52); Istanbul, Ottoman Empire			
Ayşe Sultan	c. 1605/08 Istanbul, Ottoman Empire	Kösem Sultan	Ahmed I	Damad Ibşir Mustafa Pasha (1655–1655)		May 1657 (aged 48–52); Istanbul, Ottoman Empire			
Ayşe Sultan	c. 1605/08 Istanbul, Ottoman Empire	Kösem Sultan	Ahmed I	Damad Ermeni Süleyman Pasha (1656–1657)		May 1657 (aged 48–52); Istanbul, Ottoman Empire			
Fatma Sultan	c. 1606; Istanbul, Ottoman Empire	Kösem Sultan	Ahmed I	Kara Mustafa Pasha (m. 1623; died 1628)		1670 (aged 63–64); Istanbul, Ottoman Empire			
Fatma Sultan	c. 1606; Istanbul, Ottoman Empire	Kösem Sultan	Ahmed I	Çatalcalı Hasan Pasha (m. 1624; div. 1626)	Sultanzade Hasan Bey	1670 (aged 63–64); Istanbul, Ottoman Empire			
Fatma Sultan	c. 1606; Istanbul, Ottoman Empire	Kösem Sultan	Ahmed I	Canpuladzade Mustafa Pasha (m. 1632; executed 1636)	Sultanzade Canbuladzade Süleyman Bey; Sultanzade Canbuladzade Hüseyin Paşah	1670 (aged 63–64); Istanbul, Ottoman Empire			
Fatma Sultan	c. 1606; Istanbul, Ottoman Empire	Kösem Sultan	Ahmed I	Koca Yusuf Pasha (m. 1637; died 1658)		1670 (aged 63–64); Istanbul, Ottoman Empire			
Fatma Sultan	c. 1606; Istanbul, Ottoman Empire	Kösem Sultan	Ahmed I	Melek Ahmed Pasha (m. 1662; died 1662)		1670 (aged 63–64); Istanbul, Ottoman Empire			
Fatma Sultan	c. 1606; Istanbul, Ottoman Empire	Kösem Sultan	Ahmed I	Kanbur Mustafa Pasha (m. 1663; died 1666)		1670 (aged 63–64); Istanbul, Ottoman Empire			
Fatma Sultan	c. 1606; Istanbul, Ottoman Empire	Kösem Sultan	Ahmed I	Közbekçi Yusuf Pasha (m. 1667)	three sons and one daughter	1670 (aged 63–64); Istanbul, Ottoman Empire			
Gevherhan Sultan	c. 1608; Istanbul, Turkey	Kösem Sultan or Mahfiruz Hatun	Ahmed I	Topal Recep Pasha (m. 1624; died 1632)	Sultanzade Fülan Bey	1660; Istanbul, Ottoman Empire			
Gevherhan Sultan	c. 1608; Istanbul, Turkey	Kösem Sultan or Mahfiruz Hatun	Ahmed I	Öküz Mehmed Pasha (m. 1612; died 1621)	Safiye Hanimsultan	1660; Istanbul, Ottoman Empire			
Hatice Sultan	1608 Costantinople, Ottoman Empire	maybe Mahfiruz Hatun	Ahmed I			1610 Costantinople, Ottoman Empire			
Hanzade Sultan	c. 1607; Istanbul, Ottoman Empire	Kösem Sultan	Ahmed I	Bayram Pasha (m. 1623; died 1638)	Fülane Hanımsultan	21 September 1650 (aged 42–43); Istanbul, Ottoman Empire			
Hanzade Sultan	c. 1607; Istanbul, Ottoman Empire	Kösem Sultan	Ahmed I	Nakkaş Mustafa Pasha (m. 1639)	Sultanzade Abdülbaki Bey	21 September 1650 (aged 42–43); Istanbul, Ottoman Empire			
Esma Sultan	1612 Costantinople, Ottoman Empire	unknown	Ahmed I			1612 Costantinople, Ottoman Empire			
Zahide Sultan	1613 Costantinople, Ottoman Empire	unknown	Ahmed I			1620 Costantinople, Ottoman Empire			
Atike Sultan	1614; Istanbul, Ottoman Empire	Kösem Sultan	Ahmed I	Cafer Pasha (m. 1633; died 1647)	Mihnea III of Wallachia (adoptive)	1674; Istanbul, Ottoman Empire			
Atike Sultan	1614; Istanbul, Ottoman Empire	Kösem Sultan	Ahmed I	Koca Kenan Pasha (m. 1648; died 1652)	Mihnea III of Wallachia (adoptive)	1674; Istanbul, Ottoman Empire			
Atike Sultan	1614; Istanbul, Ottoman Empire	Kösem Sultan	Ahmed I	Doganci Yusuf Pasha (m. 1652; died 1670)	Mihnea III of Wallachia (adoptive)	1674; Istanbul, Ottoman Empire			
Zeynep Sultan	1617 Istanbul, Ottoman Empire	unknown	Ahmed I			1619 Istanbul, Ottoman Empire			
Abide Sultan	1618 Istanbul, Ottoman Empire	unknown	Ahmed I	Koca Musa Pasha (m. 1642)		1648 Costantinople, Ottoman Empire			
Zeynep Sultan	November 1622 Istanbul, Ottoman Empire	Akile Hatun?	Osman II			c. 1623			
Fülane Sultan	1627 Costantinople, Ottoman Empire	unknown	Murad IV	Tüccarzade Mustafa Pasha (m. 1640)					
Gevherhan Sultan	February 1630Costantinople, Ottoman Empire	unknown	Murad IV	Haseki Mehmed Pasha		?			
Hanzade Sultan	1631Costantinople, Ottoman Empire	unknown	Murad IV	Nakkaş Mustafa Pasha (died 1657)		after 1675			
Ismihan Sultan	1632 Costantinople, Ottoman Empire	unknown	Murad IV			1632 Costantinople, Ottoman Empire			
Kaya Sultan	1633Costantinople, Ottoman Empire	unknown	Murad IV	Melek Ahmed Pasha (m. 1644)	Afife Fatma Hanımultan; Sultanzade Abdüllah Bey; Fülane Hanımsultan	c. 1658 (aged 24–25); Istanbul, Ottoman Empire			
Rabia Sultan	? Costantinople, Ottoman Empire	unknown	Murad IV			? Costantinople, Ottoman Empire			
Fatma Sultan	? Costantinople, Ottoman Empire	unknown	Murad IV			? Costantinople, Ottoman Empire			
Ayşe Sultan	? Costantinople, Ottoman Empire	unknown	Murad IV	Malatuk Süleyman Pasha (m. 1655)					
Hafsa Sultan	? Costantinople, Ottoman Empire	unknown	Murad IV			? Costantinople, Ottoman Empire			
Fülane Sultan	? Costantinople, Ottoman Empire	unknown	Murad IV	Ammarzade Mehmed Paşah					
Safiye Sultan	after 1634Costantinople, Ottoman Empire	unknown	Murad IV	Abaza Siyavuş Pasha (m. 1659)	Sultanzade Abubekr Bey; Sultanzade Mehmed Remzi Paşah; Rukiye Hanımsultan; Sultanzade Abdüllah Bey (stillborn)	1680 Costantinople, Ottoman Empire			
Rukiye Sultan	1640 Costantinople, Ottoman Empire	unknown	Murad IV	Şeytân Melek İbrâhîm Pasha (died 1685)	Fatma Hanımsultan (1677–1727); Ayşe Hanımsultan (1680–1717)	between 1696 and 1703			
Rukiye Sultan	1640 Costantinople, Ottoman Empire	unknown	Murad IV	Gürcü Mehmed Pasha (m. 1693) or Bıyıklı Mehmed Pasha (m. 1693)		between 1696 and 1703			
Esma Sultan	?	unknown	Murad IV			died in infancy			
Safiye Sultan	1640 Constantinople, Ottoman Empire	Saliha Dilaşub Sultan?	Ibrahim I	Baki Bey		?			
Fatma Sultan	last 1642 Constantinople, Ottoman Empire	Turhan Sultan?	Ibrahim I	Musahip Silahdar Yusuf Paşah (m. 1645; executed 1646)		1657			
Fatma Sultan	last 1642 Constantinople, Ottoman Empire	Turhan Sultan?	Ibrahim I	Musahib Fazlı Paşa (m. 1646; div. 1646)		1657			
Gevherhan Sultan	c. 1642; Istanbul, Ottoman Empire	Muazzez Sultan	Ibrahim I	Damad Musahıp Cafer Pasha (m. 1646; died 1647)		27 October 1694 (aged 51–52); Edirne, Ottoman Empire			
Gevherhan Sultan	c. 1642; Istanbul, Ottoman Empire	Muazzez Sultan	Ibrahim I	Damad Çavuşzade Mehmed Pasha		27 October 1694 (aged 51–52); Edirne, Ottoman Empire			
Gevherhan Sultan	c. 1642; Istanbul, Ottoman Empire	Muazzez Sultan	Ibrahim I	Damad Helvacı Yusuf Pasha (m. 1692)		27 October 1694 (aged 51–52); Edirne, Ottoman Empire			
Beyhan Sultan	1645; Istanbul, Ottoman Empire	Turhan Sultan?	Ibrahim I	Küçük Hasan Pasha (m. 1646, died)		15 September 1700; Istanbul, Ottoman Empire			
Beyhan Sultan	1645; Istanbul, Ottoman Empire	Turhan Sultan?	Ibrahim I	Hezarpare Ahmed Pasha (m. 1647; murdered 1648)		15 September 1700; Istanbul, Ottoman Empire			
Beyhan Sultan	1645; Istanbul, Ottoman Empire	Turhan Sultan?	Ibrahim I	Uzun Ibrahim Pasha (m. 1659; died 1683)		15 September 1700; Istanbul, Ottoman Empire			
Beyhan Sultan	1645; Istanbul, Ottoman Empire	Turhan Sultan?	Ibrahim I	Bıyıklı Mustafa Pasha (m. 1689; died 1699)	Sultanzade Hüseyin Bey	15 September 1700; Istanbul, Ottoman Empire			
Ayşe Sultan	1646, Constantinople	unknown	Ibrahim I	Ibşir Mustafa Pasha (m. 1655; executed 1655)		1675, Cairo			
Ayşe Sultan	1646, Constantinople	unknown	Ibrahim I	Defterdar Ibrahim Paşah (died 1664)		1675, Cairo			
Ayşe Sultan	1646, Constantinople	unknown	Ibrahim I	Sultanzade Canbuladzade Hüseyn Pasha		1675, Cairo			
Atike Sultan	? Istanbul, Ottoman Empire	Turhan Sultan?	Ibrahim I	Sari Kenan Pasha (m. 1648; died 1659)		1686; Istanbul, Ottoman Empire			
Atike Sultan	? Istanbul, Ottoman Empire	Turhan Sultan?	Ibrahim I	Bosnak Ismail Pasha (m. 1659; died 1664)		1686; Istanbul, Ottoman Empire			
Atike Sultan	? Istanbul, Ottoman Empire	Turhan Sultan?	Ibrahim I	Gürcü Mehmed Pasha (m. 1665, died)		1686; Istanbul, Ottoman Empire			
Kaya Sultan	? Istanbul, Ottoman Empire	unknown	Ibrahim I	Haydarağazade Mehmed Paşa (m. 1649; executed 1661)		?			
Ümmügülsüm Sultan	? Istanbul, Ottoman Empire	unknown	Ibrahim I	Abaza Ahmed Pasha (m. 1654)		1654			
Bican Sultan	? Istanbul, Ottoman Empire	unknown	Ibrahim I	Cerrah Kasım Paşah (m. 1666)		?			
Hatice Sultan	c. 1660; Istanbul, Ottoman Empire	Gülnuş Sultan	Mehmed IV	Kuloğlu Musahip Mustafa Pasha (m. 1675; died 1686)	Sultanzade Mehmed Bey; Sultanzade Hasan Bey; Sultanzade Vasif Bey; Sultanzade Ali Bey; Sultanzade Abdullah Bey	5 July 1743 (aged 82–83); Edirne, Ottoman Empire			
Hatice Sultan	c. 1660; Istanbul, Ottoman Empire	Gülnuş Sultan	Mehmed IV	Damat Hasan Pasha (m. 1691; died 1713)	Ayşe Rukiye Hanımsultan	5 July 1743 (aged 82–83); Edirne, Ottoman Empire			
Ayşe Sultan	c. 1673	Gülnuş Sultan	Mehmed IV	betrothed to Kara Mustafa Paşah around 1675		c. 1676			
Fatma Emetullah Sultan	between 1676 and 1680 Edirne, Ottoman Empire or Constantinople, Ottoman Empire	Gülnuş Sultan	Mehmed IV	Çerkes Ibrahim Pasha (m. 1695; died 1697)	Rukiye Hanimsultan	17 December 1700 (aged 24–25)			
Fatma Emetullah Sultan	between 1676 and 1680 Edirne, Ottoman Empire or Constantinople, Ottoman Empire	Gülnuş Sultan	Mehmed IV	Topal Yusuf Pasha (m. 1697; died 1700)	Safiye Hanimsultan	17 December 1700 (aged 24–25)			
Ümmügülsüm Sultan	Istanbul, Ottoman Empire	Gülnuş Sultan	Mehmed IV	Silahdar Çerkeş Osman Pasha (m. 1693)	Mihrişah Hanımsultan; Hatice Hanımsultan; Fatma Hanımsultan	10 May 1720; Istanbul, Ottoman Empire			
Fülane Sultan	1668?	unknown	Mehmed IV	Kasım Mustafa Paşah (m. 1687)		?			
Fülane Sultan	?	Gülbeyaz Hatun?	Mehmed IV			?			
Gevherhan Sultan	?	unknown	Mehmed IV			?			
Asiye Sultan	23 October 1694 Edirne, Ottoman Empire	Rabia Sultan	Ahmed II			9 December 1695 Istanbul, Ottoman Empire			
Atike Sultan (her existence is controversial)	born 24 October 1694	if she really was a different princess from Aiye Sultan, her mother was probably Şayeste Hatun	Ahmed II						
Hatice Sultan	?	Şayeste Hatun?	Ahmed II						
Büyük Ayşe Sultan	30 April 1696; Edirne, Ottoman Empire	unknown	Mustafa II	Köprülüzade Numan Pasha (m. 1708; died 1719)		26 September 1752 (aged 56); Istanbul, Ottoman Empire			
Büyük Ayşe Sultan	30 April 1696; Edirne, Ottoman Empire	unknown	Mustafa II	Silahdar Ibrahim Pasha (m. 1720; died 1722)		26 September 1752 (aged 56); Istanbul, Ottoman Empire			
Büyük Ayşe Sultan	30 April 1696; Edirne, Ottoman Empire	unknown	Mustafa II	Koca Mustafa Pasha (m. 1725; died 1728)		26 September 1752 (aged 56); Istanbul, Ottoman Empire			
Emine Sultan	1 September 1696; Edirne, Ottoman Empire	unknown	Mustafa II	Çorlulu Ali Pasha (m. 1708; died 1711)		c. 1739 (aged 42–43); Istanbul, Ottoman Empire			
Emine Sultan	1 September 1696; Edirne, Ottoman Empire	unknown	Mustafa II	Recep Pasha (m. 1712, divorced)		c. 1739 (aged 42–43); Istanbul, Ottoman Empire			
Emine Sultan	1 September 1696; Edirne, Ottoman Empire	unknown	Mustafa II	Ibrahim Pasha (m. 1724, divorced)		c. 1739 (aged 42–43); Istanbul, Ottoman Empire			
Emine Sultan	1 September 1696; Edirne, Ottoman Empire	unknown	Mustafa II	Abdullah Pasha (m. 1728; died 1736)		c. 1739 (aged 42–43); Istanbul, Ottoman Empire			
Safiye Sultan	13 December 1696; Edirne, Ottoman Empire	unknown	Mustafa II	Maktulzade Ali Pasha (m. 1710; died 1723)	Sultanzade Ebubekr Bey; Sultanzade Bayezid Bey; Zahide Hanımsultan	15 May 1778 (aged 81); Istanbul, Ottoman Empire			
Safiye Sultan	13 December 1696; Edirne, Ottoman Empire	unknown	Mustafa II	Mirzazade Mehmed Pasha (m. 1726; died 1728)	Sultanzade Sadik Mehmed Bey	15 May 1778 (aged 81); Istanbul, Ottoman Empire			
Safiye Sultan	13 December 1696; Edirne, Ottoman Empire	unknown	Mustafa II	Ebubekir Pasha (m. 1740; died 1759)		15 May 1778 (aged 81); Istanbul, Ottoman Empire			
Hatice Sultan	15 March 1698	unknown	Mustafa II			before 1703 Edirne, Ottoman Empire			
Rukiye Sultan	13 November 1698	unknown	Mustafa II			28 March 1699 Edirne, Ottoman Empire			
Rukiye Ismihan Sultan	after April 1699	unknown	Mustafa II			24 December 1703 Istanbul, Ottoman Empire			
Fatma Sultan	8 October 1699	unknown	Mustafa II			20 May 1700Istanbul, Ottoman Empire			
Ümmügülsüm Sultan	0 June 1700	unknown	Mustafa II			2 May 1701 Edirne, Ottoman Empire			
Emetullah Sultan	c. 1701; Edirne, Ottoman Empire	Şehsuvar Sultan	Mustafa II	Osman Pasha (m. 1720; died 1724)	Hibetullah Hanımultan	19 April 1727 (aged 25–26); Istanbul, Ottoman Empire			
Zeynep Sultan	10 June 1703	unknown	Mustafa II			18 December 1705 Istanbul, Ottoman Empire			
Atike Sultan	?	unknown	Mustafa II			?			
Esma Sultan	?	unknown	Mustafa II			?			
Fatma Sultan	22 September 1704; Istanbul, Ottoman Empire	Emetullah Kadın	Ahmed III	Silahdar Damat Ali Pasha (m. 1709; died 1716)		May 1733 (aged 28); Istanbul, Ottoman Empire			
Fatma Sultan	22 September 1704; Istanbul, Ottoman Empire	Emetullah Kadın	Ahmed III	Nevşehirli Damat Ibrahim Pasha (m. 1717; died 1730)	Sultanzade Mehmed Paşah; Sultanzade Genç Mehmed Bey; Fatma Hanımsultan; Heybetullah Hanımsultan	May 1733 (aged 28); Istanbul, Ottoman Empire			
Hatice Sultan	21 January 1701	unknown	Ahmed III			29 August 1707			
Ayşe Sultan	?	unknown	Ahmed III			1706			
Mihrimah Sultan	?	unknown	Ahmed III			17 June 1706			
Rukiye Sultan	3 March 1707	unknown	Ahmed III			29 August 1707			
Ümmügülsüm Sultan	11 February 1708; Istanbul, Ottoman Empire	unknown	Ahmed III	Genç Ali Pasha (m. 1724)	Sultanzade Mustafa Bey; Sultanzade Mehmed Bey; Sultanzade Hafız Bey; Sultanzade Hacı Bey; Fülane Hanımsultan	28 November 1732 (aged 24); Constantinople, Ottoman Empire (now Istanbul, Turkey)			
Zeynep Sultan	11 February 1708; Istanbul, Ottoman Empire	unknown	Ahmed III			5 November 1708			
Zeynep Sultan	5 January 1710	unknown	Ahmed III			July 1710			
Hatice Sultan	8 February 1710	unknown	Ahmed III			before September 1710			
Hatice Sultan	27 September 1710; Istanbul, Ottoman Empire	Rukiye Kadın	Ahmed III	Hafız Ahmed Pasha (m. 1724)		c. 1738 (aged 27–28); Constantinople, Ottoman Empire (now Istanbul, Turkey)			
Emine Sultan	1711	unknown	Ahmed III			1720			
Atike Sultan	29 February 1712; Istanbul, Ottoman Empire	unknown	Ahmed III	Genç Mehmed Pasha (m. 1724)	Sultanzadre Fülan Bey	2 April 1737 (aged 25); Istanbul, Ottoman Empire			
Rukiye Sultan	7 March 1713	unknown	Ahmed III			October 1715			
Saliha Sultan	21 March 1715; Edirne, Ottoman Empire	Hatem Kadın	Ahmed III	Sari Mustafa Pasha (m. 1728; died 1731)	Sultanzade Ahmed Bey; Fatma Hanımsultan	11 October 1778 (aged 63); Istanbul, Ottoman Empire			
Saliha Sultan	21 March 1715; Edirne, Ottoman Empire	Hatem Kadın	Ahmed III	Sarhoş Ali Pasha (m. 1740; died 1744)	By unknown marriage: Ayşe Hanımsultan; Emine Hanımsultan; Hatice Hanımsultan	11 October 1778 (aged 63); Istanbul, Ottoman Empire			
Saliha Sultan	21 March 1715; Edirne, Ottoman Empire	Hatem Kadın	Ahmed III	Hatibzade Yahya Pasha (m. 1745; died 1755)	By unknown marriage: Ayşe Hanımsultan; Emine Hanımsultan; Hatice Hanımsultan	11 October 1778 (aged 63); Istanbul, Ottoman Empire			
Saliha Sultan	21 March 1715; Edirne, Ottoman Empire	Hatem Kadın	Ahmed III	Koca Ragıp Pasha (m. 1758; died 1763)	By unknown marriage: Ayşe Hanımsultan; Emine Hanımsultan; Hatice Hanımsultan	11 October 1778 (aged 63); Istanbul, Ottoman Empire			
Saliha Sultan	21 March 1715; Edirne, Ottoman Empire	Hatem Kadın	Ahmed III	Turşu Mehmed Pasha (m. 1764; died 1770)	By unknown marriage: Ayşe Hanımsultan; Emine Hanımsultan; Hatice Hanımsultan	11 October 1778 (aged 63); Istanbul, Ottoman Empire			
Küçuk Ayşe Sultan	24 November 1718; Istanbul, Ottoman Empire	Emine Muslı Kadın	Ahmed III	Kunduracızade Mehmed Pasha (m. 1728; died 1737)		9 July 1775 (aged 59); Istanbul, Ottoman Empire			
Küçuk Ayşe Sultan	24 November 1718; Istanbul, Ottoman Empire	Emine Muslı Kadın	Ahmed III	Hatip Ahmed Pasha (m. 1740; died 1748)	Rukiye Hanımsultan	9 July 1775 (aged 59); Istanbul, Ottoman Empire			
Küçuk Ayşe Sultan	24 November 1718; Istanbul, Ottoman Empire	Emine Muslı Kadın	Ahmed III	Silahdar Mehmed Pasha (m. 1758)		9 July 1775 (aged 59); Istanbul, Ottoman Empire			
Ferdane Sultan	?	unknown	Ahmed III			died as a child in 1718			
Reyhane Sultan	1718	unknown	Ahmed III			1729			
Ümmüseleme Sultan	?	unknown	Ahmed III			1719			
Rabia Sultan	19 November 1719	unknown	Ahmed III			1727			
Emetullah Sultan	1719	unknown	Ahmed III			1724			
Zeynep Asima Sultan	c. 1715; Istanbul, Ottoman Empire	unknown	Ahmed III	Sinek Mustafa Pasha (m. 1728; died 1764)	Sultanzade Yüsuf Bey	25 March 1774 (aged 58–59); Istanbul, Ottoman Empire			
Zeynep Asima Sultan	c. 1715; Istanbul, Ottoman Empire	unknown	Ahmed III	Melek Mehmed Pasha (m. 1765)		25 March 1774 (aged 58–59); Istanbul, Ottoman Empire			
Rukiye Sultan	?	unknown	Ahmed III			1720			
Beyhan Sultan	?	unknown	Ahmed III			1720			
Emetullah Sultan	17 September 1723	unknown	Ahmed III			28 January 1724			
Emine Sultan	late 1723/early 1724	unknown	Ahmed III			1732			
Nafize Sultan	May 1723/1725	unknown	Ahmed III			before 1730 or 29 December 1764			
Ümmüseleme Sultan	12 October 1724	unknown	Ahmed III			5 December 1732			
Naile Sultan	15 December 1725	unknown	Ahmed III			October 1727			
Büyük Esma Sultan	14 March 1726; Istanbul, Ottoman Empire	Hanife Kadın or Zeynep Kadın	Ahmed III	Yakub Pasha (m. 1743; died 1743)		13 August 1788 (aged 62); Istanbul, Ottoman Empire			
Büyük Esma Sultan	14 March 1726; Istanbul, Ottoman Empire	Hanife Kadın or Zeynep Kadın	Ahmed III	Yusuf Pasha		13 August 1788 (aged 62); Istanbul, Ottoman Empire			
Büyük Esma Sultan	14 March 1726; Istanbul, Ottoman Empire	Hanife Kadın or Zeynep Kadın	Ahmed III	Muhsinzade Mehmed Pasha (m. 1758; died 1774)	Zeynep Hanımsultan	13 August 1788 (aged 62); Istanbul, Ottoman Empire			
Sabiha Sultan	19 December 1726 Istanbul, Ottoman Empire	unknown	Ahmed III			17 December 1726			
Rebia Sultan	28 October 1727 Istanbul, Ottoman Empire	unknown	Ahmed III			4 April 1728			
Zübeyde Sultan	29 March 1728; Istanbul, Ottoman Empire	Emine Muslı Kadın	Ahmed III	Damad Süleyman Pasha (m. 1748; died 1748)		4 June 1756 (aged 28); Istanbul, Ottoman Empire			
Zübeyde Sultan	29 March 1728; Istanbul, Ottoman Empire	Emine Muslı Kadın	Ahmed III	Damad Numan Pasha (m. 1749)		4 June 1756 (aged 28); Istanbul, Ottoman Empire			
Ümmi Sultan	?	unknown	Ahmed III			1729			
ÜmmühabibeSultan	?	unknown	Ahmed III			1730			
Akile Sultan	?	unknown	Ahmed III			1737			
Ümmi Sultan	1730 Istanbul, Ottoman Empire	unknown	Ahmed III			1742			
Hibetullah Sultan	17 March 1759 Istanbul, Ottoman Empire	Mihrişah Kadin	Mustafa II			7 June 1762			
Şah Sultan	21 April 1761; Istanbul, Ottoman Empire	Rifat Kadın or Fehime Kadın	Mustafa II	Seyyid Mustafa Pasha (m. 1778)	Şerife Havva Hanımsultan; Aliye Hanımsultan; New Hanim (adopted)	11 March 1803 (aged 41); Istanbul, Ottoman Empire			
Mihrima Sultan	5 February 1762 Istanbul, Ottoman Empire	Aynülhayat Kadın	Mustafa II			16 March 1764			
Mihrişah Sultan	9 January 1763 Istanbul, Ottoman Empire	Aynülhayat Kadın?	Mustafa II			21 February 1769			
Beyhan Sultan	13 January 1766; Istanbul, Ottoman Empire	Adilşah Kadın	Mustafa II	Çelik Mustafa Pasha (m. 1784; died 1799)	Hatice Hanımsultan	7 November 1824 (aged 58); Istanbul, Ottoman Empire			
Hatice Sultan	15 June 1766 Istanbul, Ottoman Empire	Aynülhayat Kadın	Mustafa II			1767			
Hatice Sultan	14 June 1768; Istanbul, Ottoman Empire	Adilşah Kadın	Mustafa II	Seyyid Ahmed Pasha (m. 1786; died 1798)	Sultanzade Alaeddin Pasha	17 July 1822 (aged 54); Istanbul, Ottoman Empire			
Fatma Sultan	9 January 1770 Istanbul, Ottoman Empire	Mihrişah Kadin	Mustafa II			26 May 1772			
Reyhan Sultan	?	unknown	Mustafa II			?			
Dürrüşehvar Hanım	c. 1767 Constantinople, Ottoman Empire	unknown	Abdul Hamid I	Nişancı Ahmed Nazif Efendi (m. 1784; executed 1789)	Atiyetullah Hanım (b. 1785); Zeynep Hanım (b. 1789)				
Hatice Sultan	12 January 1776 Istanbul, Ottoman Empire	unknown	Abdul Hamid I			8 November 1776 Istanbul, Ottoman Empire			
Ayşe Sultan	30 July 1777 Istanbul, Ottoman Empire	unknown	Abdul Hamid I			9 September 1777 Istanbul, Ottoman Empire			
Esma Sultan	16 July 1778; Istanbul, Ottoman Empire	Sineperver Sultan	Abdul Hamid I	Küçük Hüseyin Pasha (m. 1792; died 1803)		4 June 1848 (aged 69); Istanbul, Ottoman Empire			
Melekşah Sultan	19 February 1779 Istanbul, Ottoman Empire	unknown	Abdul Hamid I			1780 Istanbul, Ottoman Empire			
Rabia Sultan	20 March 1780 Istanbul, Ottoman Empire	unknown	Abdul Hamid I			28 June 1780 Istanbul, Ottoman Empire			
Aynışah Sultan	9 July 1780 Istanbul, Ottoman Empire	unknown	Abdul Hamid I			28 July 1780 Istanbul, Ottoman Empire			
Melekşah Sultan	28 January 1781 Istanbul, Ottoman Empire	unknown	Abdul Hamid I			24 December 1781			
Rabia Sultan	10 August 1781 Istanbul, Ottoman Empire	unknown	Abdul Hamid I			3 October 1786 Istanbul, Ottoman Empire			
Fatma Sultan	12 December 1782 Istanbul, Ottoman Empire	Sineperver Sultan	Abdul Hamid I			11 January 1786 Istanbul, Ottoman Empire			
Hatice Sultan	6 October 1784 Istanbul, Ottoman Empire	unknown	Abdul Hamid I			1784 Istanbul, Ottoman Empire			
Alemşah Sultan	11 October 1784 Istanbul, Ottoman Empire	unknown	Abdul Hamid I			10 March 1786 Istanbul, Ottoman Empire			
Saliha Sultan	27 November 1788 Istanbul, Ottoman Empire	unknown	Abdul Hamid I			10 April 1788 Istanbul, Ottoman Empire			
Emine Sultan	4 February 1788 Istanbul, Ottoman Empire	unknown	Abdul Hamid I			9 March 1791Istanbul, Ottoman Empire			
Zekiye Sultan	? Istanbul, Ottoman Empire	unknown	Abdul Hamid I			20 March 1788, Ottoman Empire			
Hibetullah Sultan	16 March 1789; Istanbul, Ottoman Empire	Şebsefa Kadın	Abdul Hamid I	Alaeddin Pasha (m. 1801; died 1812)		18 September 1841 (aged 52); Istanbul, Ottoman Empire			
Emine Sultan	6 May 1809 Istanbul, Ottoman Empire		Mustafa IV			October 1809 Istanbul, Ottoman Empire			
Fatma Sultan	4 February 1809 Istanbul, Ottoman Empire	Nevfidan Kadin	Mahmud II			5 August 1809 Istanbul, Ottoman Empire			
Ayşe Sultan	5 July 1809 Istanbul, Ottoman Empire	Aşubcan Kadın	Mahmud II			February 1810 Istanbul, Ottoman Empire			
Fatma Sultan	30 April 1810Istanbul, Ottoman Empire	Nevfidan Kadin	Mahmud II			7 May 1825Istanbul, Ottoman Empire			
Saliha Sultan	16 June 1811; Istanbul, Ottoman Empire	Aşubcan Kadın	Mahmud II	Damat Gürcü Halil Rifat Pasha (m. 1834)	Sultanzade Abdülhamid Bey Efendi; Sultanzade Cavid Bey Efendi; Ayşe Şıdıka Hanımsultan	6 February 1843 (aged 31); Istanbul, Ottoman Empire			
Şah Sultan	22 May 1812 Istanbul, Ottoman Empire	Aşubcan Kadın	Mahmud II			September 1814 Istanbul, Ottoman Empire			
Mihrimah Sultan	29 June 1812; Istanbul, Ottoman Empire	Hoşyar Kadın	Mahmud II	Mehmed Said Pasha (m. 1835)	Sultanzade Mehmed Abdullah Bey	31 August 1838 (aged 26); Istanbul, Ottoman Empire			
Emine Sultan	12 June 1813; Istanbul, Ottoman Empire	Nevfidan Kadin	Mahmud II			July 1814; Istanbul, Ottoman Empire			
Atiye Sultan	2 January 1824; Istanbul, Ottoman Empire	Pervizifelek Kadın	Mahmud II	Ahmed Fethi Pasha (m. 1840)	Seniye Hanımsultan; Feride Hanımsultan	11 August 1850 (aged 26); Istanbul, Ottoman Empire			
Şah Sultan	14 October 1814; Istanbul, Ottoman Empire	Fourth Kadın	Mahmud II			13 April 1817; Istanbul, Ottoman Empire			
Emine Sultan	7 January 1815 Istanbul, Ottoman Empire	Nevfidan Kadin	Mahmud II			24 September 1816 Istanbul, Ottoman Empire			
Zeynep Sultan	18 April 1815Istanbul, Ottoman Empire	Hoşyar Kadın	Mahmud II			February 1816Istanbul, Ottoman Empire			
Hamide Sultan	14 July 1817Istanbul, Ottoman Empire	unknown	Mahmud II			July 1817Istanbul, Ottoman Empire			
Cemile Sultan	1818 Istanbul, Ottoman Empire	unknown	Mahmud II			1818 Istanbul, Ottoman Empire			
Hamide Sultan	4 July 1818Istanbul, Ottoman Empire	unknown	Mahmud II			15 February 1818 Istanbul, Ottoman Empire			
Münire Sultan	16 October 1824 Istanbul, Ottoman Empire	unknown	Mahmud II			23 May 1825 Istanbul, Ottoman Empire			
Hatice Sultan	6 September 1825Istanbul, Ottoman Empire	Pervizifelek Kadın	Mahmud II			19 December 1842 Istanbul, Ottoman Empire			
Adile Sultan	23 May 1826; Istanbul, Ottoman Empire	Zernigar Hanım Adoptive Nevfidan Kadin	Mahmud II	Damat Mehmed Ali Pasha (m. 1845; died 1868)	Hayriye Hanımsultan; Sultanzade Ismail Bey; Sıdıka Hanımsultan; Aliye Hanımsultan	12 February 1899 (aged 72); Istanbul, Ottoman Empire			
Fatma Sultan	20 July 1828; Istanbul, Ottoman Empire	Pervizifelek Kadın	Mahmud II			23 February 1839; Istanbul, Ottoman Empire			
Hayriye Sultan	22 March 1831; Istanbul, Ottoman Empire	unknown	Mahmud II			15 February 1833; Istanbul, Ottoman Empire			
Mevhibe Sultan	9 May 1840 Istanbul, Ottoman Empire	Hoşyar Kadın	Abdulmejid I			9 February 1841 Istanbul, Ottoman Empire			
Naime Sultan	11 October 1840 Topkapı Palace Istanbul, Ottoman Empire	Tirimüjgan Kadın	Abdulmejid I			May 1843 Istanbul, Ottoman Empire			
Fatma Sultan	1 November 1840; Istanbul, Ottoman Empire	Gülcemal KadınAdoptiveServetseza Kadın	Abdulmejid I	Ali Galip Pasha (m. 1854; died 1858)	Cemile Hanımsultan (1855–1855)	29 August 1884 (aged 43); Istanbul, Ottoman Empire			
Fatma Sultan	1 November 1840; Istanbul, Ottoman Empire	Gülcemal KadınAdoptiveServetseza Kadın	Abdulmejid I	Nuri Pasha (m. 1859; died 1883)	Sultanzade Mehmed Fuad Bey (1861–1864); Emine Lütfiye Hanımsultan (February 1863 – August 1865)	29 August 1884 (aged 43); Istanbul, Ottoman Empire			
Behiye Sultan	22 February 1841 Istanbul, Ottoman Empire	Zeynifelek Hanim	Abdulmejid I			3 August 1847 Istanbul, Ottoman Empire			
Neyire Sultan	13 October 1841 Beşiktaş Palace Istanbul, Ottoman Empire	Düzdidil Hanim	Abdulmejid I			14 January 1844 Istanbul, Ottoman Empire			
Münire Sultan	13 October 1841 Beşiktaş Palace Istanbul, Ottoman Empire	Düzdidil Hanim	Abdulmejid I			18 December 1841 Istanbul, Ottoman Empire			
Aliye Sultan	1842 Çırağan Palace, Istanbul, Ottoman Empire	Nükhetseza Hanim	Abdulmejid I			1842 Istanbul, Ottoman Empire			
Hatice Sultan	7 February 1842 Istanbul, Ottoman Empire	Gülcemal Kadın	Abdulmejid I			1842 Istanbul, Ottoman Empire			
Refia Sultan	7 February 1842; Istanbul, Ottoman Empire	Gülcemal KadınAdoptiveServetseza Kadın	Abdulmejid I	Mahmud Edham Pasha (m. 1857)	Fülane Hanımsultan	4 January 1880 (aged 37); Istanbul, Ottoman Empire			
Aliye Sultan	2 October 1842 Beşiktaş Palace Istanbul, Ottoman Empire	Şevkefza Kadın	Abdulmejid I			10 July 1845 Istanbul, Ottoman Empire			
Cemile Sultan	17 August 1843; Beylerbeyi Palace, Istanbul, Ottoman Empire	Düzdidil HanimAdoptiveRahime Perestu Kadin	Abdulmejid I	Mahmud Celaleddin Pasha (m. 1858; died 1884)	Fethiye Hanımsultan; Sultanzade Besim Bey; Sultanzade Mehmed Mahmud Bey; Sultanzade Mehmed Sakıb Bey; Ayşe Sıdıka Hanımsultan; Fatma Hanımsultan	26 February 1915 (aged 71); Istanbul, Ottoman Empire			
Münire Sultan	9 December 1844; Istanbul, Ottoman Empire	Verdicenan Kadın	Abdulmejid I	Ibrahim Ilhami Pasha (m. 1857; died 1860)		29 June 1862 (aged 17); Istanbul, Ottoman Empire			
Münire Sultan	9 December 1844; Istanbul, Ottoman Empire	Verdicenan Kadın	Abdulmejid I	Ibrahim Pasha (m. 1861)	Sultanzade Alaeddin Bey	29 June 1862 (aged 17); Istanbul, Ottoman Empire			
Samiye Sultan	23 February 1845 Topkapı Palace Istanbul, Ottoman Empire	Düzdidil Hanim	Abdulmejid I			15 April 1845 Istanbul, Ottoman Empire			
Fatma Nezime Sultan	26 November 1847 Beylerbeyi Palace Istanbul, Ottoman Empire	Nükhetseza Hanim	Abdulmejid I			1 December 1847 Istanbul, Ottoman Empire			
Sabiha Sultan	15 April 1848 Çırağan Palace, Istanbul, Ottoman Empire	Mahitab Kadin	Abdulmejid I			27 April 1849 Istanbul, Ottoman Empire			
Behice Sultan	26 August 1848; Istanbul, Ottoman Empire	Nesrin HanımAdoptiveŞayan Kadin	Abdulmejid I	Hamid Bey (m. 1876)		30 November 1876 (aged 28); Istanbul, Ottoman Empire			
Mukbile Sultan	9 February 1850 Çırağan Palace, Istanbul, Ottoman Empire	Bezmiara Kadin	Abdulmejid I			25 February 1850; Istanbul, Ottoman Empire			
Rukiye Sultan	1850; Istanbul, Ottoman Empire	unknown	Abdulmejid I			1850; Istanbul, Ottoman Empire			
Seniha Sultan	5 December 1851; Çırağan Palace, Istanbul, Ottoman Empire	Nalandil Hanım	Abdulmejid I	Mahmud Celaleddin Pasha (m. 1877; died 1903)	Sultanzade Sabahaddin Bey; Sultanzade Ahmed Lütfullah Bey	15 September 1931 (aged 79); Villa Carabacel, Nice, France			
Zekiye Sultan	26 February 1855 Istanbul, Ottoman Empire	Gülüstü Hanım	Abdulmejid I			19 February 1856 Istanbul, Ottoman Empire			
Fehime Sultan	26 February 1855 Istanbul, Ottoman Empire	Gülüstü Hanım	Abdulmejid I			10 November 1856 Istanbul, Ottoman Empire			
Şehime Sultan	1 March 1855 Istanbul, Ottoman Empire	Nalandil Hanim	Abdulmejid I			21 May 1857 Istanbul, Ottoman Empire			
Mediha Sultan	31 July 1856; Dolmabahçe Palace, Istanbul, Ottoman Empire	Gülüstü HanımAdoptiveVerdicenan Kadın	Abdulmejid I	Necib Pasha (m. 1879; died 1885)	Sultanzade Sami Bey	9 November 1928 (aged 72); Nice, France			
Mediha Sultan	31 July 1856; Dolmabahçe Palace, Istanbul, Ottoman Empire	Gülüstü HanımAdoptiveVerdicenan Kadın	Abdulmejid I	Damat Ferid Pasha (m. 1886; died 1923)		9 November 1928 (aged 72); Nice, France			
Naile Sultan	30 September 1856; Dolmabahçe Palace, Istanbul, Ottoman Empire	Şayeste Hanım	Abdulmejid I	Çerkes Mehmed Pasha (m. 1876)		18 January 1882 (aged 25); Istanbul, Ottoman Empire			
Behide Sultan	30 September 1857 Beşiktaş Palace Istanbul, Ottoman Empire	Serfiraz Hanım	Abdulmejid I			12 July 1858 Istanbul, Ottoman Empire			
Atiyetullah Sultan	16 December 1858 Istanbul, Ottoman Empire	unknown	Abdulmejid I			16 December 1858 Istanbul, Ottoman Empire			
Fülane Sultan	30 May 1860 Istanbul, Ottoman Empire	unknown	Abdulmejid I			30 May 1860 Istanbul, Ottoman Empire			
Saliha Sultan	10 August 1862; Dolmabahçe Palace, Istanbul, Ottoman Empire	Dürrünev Kadın	Abdulaziz	Ahmed Zülkefil Pasha (m. 1889)	Kamile Hanımsultan	c. 1941 (aged 78–79); Cairo, Egypt			
Nazime Sultan	25 February 1867; Dolmabahçe Palace, Istanbul, Ottoman Empire	Hayranidil Kadın	Abdulaziz	Ali Hadid Pasha (m. 1889)		9 November 1947 (aged 80); Jounieh, Lebanon			
Emine Sultan	30 November 1866 Dolmabahçe Palace, Istanbul, Ottoman Empire	Edadil Kadin	Abdulaziz			23 January 1867 Dolmabahçe Palace, Istanbul, Ottoman Empire			
Esma Sultan	21 March 1873; Dolmabahçe Palace, Istanbul, Ottoman Empire	Abdulaziz; Gevheri Kadın	Abdulaziz	Kabasakal Çerkes Mehmed Pasha (m. 1889)	Sultanzade Hasan Bedreddin Bey; Sultanzade Hüseyin Hayreddin Bey; Mihriban Hanımsultan; Sultanzade Mehmed Saadeddin Bey; Sultanzade Abdullah Beyefendi	7 May 1899 (aged 26); Istanbul, Ottoman Empire			
Fatma Sultan	1874 Dolmabahçe Palace, Istanbul, Ottoman Empire	Yıldız Hanim	Abdulaziz			1875 Dolmabahçe Palace, Istanbul, Ottoman Empire			
Emine Sultan	24 August 1874; Dolmabahçe Palace, Istanbul, Ottoman Empire	Nesrin Kadın	Abdulaziz	Mehmed Şerif Pasha (m. 1901)	Hamide Hanımsultan	30 January 1920 (aged 45); Istanbul, Ottoman Empire			
Münire Sultan	1876/1877 Istanbul, Ottoman Empire	Yıldız Hanim	Abdulaziz			1877 Istanbul, Ottoman Empire			
Hatice Sultan	5 April 1870; Kurbağalıdere Köşkü, Istanbul, Ottoman Empire	Şayan Kadın	Murad V	Ali Vasıf Pasha (m. 1901; div. 1904)	Ayşe Hanımsultan	13 March 1938 (aged 67); Beirut, Lebanon			
Hatice Sultan	5 April 1870; Kurbağalıdere Köşkü, Istanbul, Ottoman Empire	Şayan Kadın	Murad V	Rauf Hayreddin Bey (m. 1909; div. 1918)	Sultanzade Osman Bey; Sultanzade Hayri Bey; Selma Hanımsultan	13 March 1938 (aged 67); Beirut, Lebanon			
Fehime Sultan	2 August 1875; Dolmabahçe Palace, Istanbul, Ottoman Empire	Meyliservet Kadın	Murad V	Ali Galib Pasha (m. 1901; div. 1911)		15 September 1929 (aged 54); Nice, France			
Fehime Sultan	2 August 1875; Dolmabahçe Palace, Istanbul, Ottoman Empire	Meyliservet Kadın	Murad V	Mahmud Bey (m. 1911–1929)		15 September 1929 (aged 54); Nice, France			
Fatma Sultan	19 June 1879; Çırağan Palace, Istanbul, Ottoman Empire	Resan Hanım	Murad V	Refik Iris Bey (m. 1907)	Sultanzade Mehmed Bey; Ayşe Hatice Hanımsultan; Sultanzade Mehmed Ali Bey; Sultanzade Mehmed Murad Bey; Sultanzade Celaleddin Bey	23 November 1930 (aged 51); Sofia, Bulgaria			
Aliye Sultan	24 August 1880; Çırağan Palace, Istanbul, Ottoman Empire	Resan Hanım	Murad V			17 September 1903 (aged 23); Istanbul, Ottoman Empire			
Ulviye Sultan	1868 Dolmabahçe Palace, Istanbul, Ottoman Empire	Nazikeda Kadın	Abdul Hamid II			5 October 1875 Istanbul, Ottoman Empire			
Zekiye Sultan	21 January 1872; Dolmabahçe Palace, Istanbul, Ottoman Empire	Bedrifelek Kadın	Abdul Hamid II	Ali Nureddin Pasha (m. 1889)	Ulviye Şükriye Hanımsultan; Fatma Aliye Hanımsultan	13 July 1950 (aged 78); Pau, Pyrénées-Atlantiques, France			
Naime Sultan	5 September 1876; Dolmabahçe Palace, Istanbul, Ottoman Empire	Bidar Kadın	Abdul Hamid II	Mehmed Kemaleddin Pasha (m. 1898; div. 1904)	Sultanzade Mehmed Cahid Bey; Adile Hanımsultan	c. 1945 (aged 68–69); Tirana, Albania			
Naime Sultan	5 September 1876; Dolmabahçe Palace, Istanbul, Ottoman Empire	Bidar Kadın	Abdul Hamid II	İşkodralı Celaleddin Pasha (m. 1907; died 1944)		c. 1945 (aged 68–69); Tirana, Albania			
Naile Sultan	9 February 1884; Yıldız Palace, Istanbul, Ottoman Empire	Dilpesend Kadın	Abdul Hamid II	Arif Hikmet Pasha (m. 1905; died 1944)		25 October 1957 (aged 73); Erenköy, Istanbul, Turkey			
Seniha Sultan	1885 Istanbul, Ottoman Empire	Dilpesend Kadın	Abdul Hamid II			1885 Istanbul, Ottoman Empire			
Şadiye Sultan	30 November 1886; Yıldız Palace, Istanbul, Ottoman Empire	Emsalinur Kadın	Abdul Hamid II	Fahir Bey (m. 1910; died 1922)	Samiye Hanımsultan	20 November 1977 (aged 90); Cihangir, Istanbul, Turkey			
Şadiye Sultan	30 November 1886; Yıldız Palace, Istanbul, Ottoman Empire	Emsalinur Kadın	Abdul Hamid II	Reşad Halis Bey (m. 1931; died 1944)		20 November 1977 (aged 90); Cihangir, Istanbul, Turkey			
Ayşe Sultan	31 October 1887; Yıldız Palace, Istanbul, Ottoman Empire	Müşfika Kadın	Abdul Hamid II	Ahmed Nami Bey; Mehmed Ali Bey	Sultanzade Ömer Nami Bey (1911–1993); Aliye Namiye Hanımsultan (1907–1974); Sultanzade Osman Nami Bey (1913–1913)	10 August 1960 (aged 72); Istanbul, Turkey			
Ayşe Sultan	31 October 1887; Yıldız Palace, Istanbul, Ottoman Empire	Müşfika Kadın	Abdul Hamid II		Sultanzade Abdülhamid Rauf Bey (October 1921 – March 11, 1981)	10 August 1960 (aged 72); Istanbul, Turkey			
Refia Sultan	15 June 1891; Yıldız Palace, Istanbul, Ottoman Empire	Sazkar Hanım	Abdul Hamid II	Ali Faud Bey (m. 1910)	Rabia Hanımsultan; Ayşe Hamide Hanımsultan	c. 1938 (aged 46–47); Beirut, Lebanon			
Hatice Sultan	10 July 1897 Istanbul, Ottoman Empire	Pesend Hanım	Abdul Hamid II			14 February 1989 Istanbul, Ottoman Empire			
Aliye Sultan	1900 Istanbul, Ottoman Empire		Abdul Hamid II			1900 Istanbul, Ottoman Empire			
Cemile Sultan	1900 Istanbul, Ottoman Empire		Abdul Hamid II			1900 Istanbul, Ottoman Empire			
Samiye Sultan	16 January 1908 Istanbul, Ottoman Empire	Saliha Naciye Kadın	Abdul Hamid II			24 January 1909 Istanbul, Ottoman Empire			
Refia Sultan	1888 Istanbul, Ottoman Empire	Nazperver Kadın	Mehmed V			1888 Istanbul, Ottoman Empire			
Münire Fenire Sultan	1888 Istanbul, Ottoman Empire	Nazikeda Kadın	Mehmed VI			1888 Istanbul, Ottoman Empire			
Ulviye Sultan	11 September 1892; Ortaköy Palace, Istanbul, Ottoman Empire	Nazikeda Kadın	Mehmed VI	Ismail Hakkı Pasha (m. 1916; div. 1922)	Hümeyra Hanımsultan	25 January 1967 (aged 74); İzmir, Turkey			
Ulviye Sultan	11 September 1892; Ortaköy Palace, Istanbul, Ottoman Empire	Nazikeda Kadın	Mehmed VI	Ali Haydar Bey (m. 1923)		25 January 1967 (aged 74); İzmir, Turkey			
Sabiha Sultan	2 April 1894; Ortaköy Palace, Istanbul, Ottoman Empire	Nazikeda Kadın	Mehmed VI	Şehzade Ömer Faruk (m. 1920; div. 1948)	Neslişah Sultan; Hanzade Sultan; Necla Sultan	26 August 1971 (aged 77); Çengelköy, Istanbul, Turkey			

== Other Ottoman princesses ==
=== Daughters of Ottoman princes ===
When a prince (şehzade)'s concubine gave birth to a girl, she took the title of sultana (sultan). These little girls, unlike the sons of a prince who succeeded in ascending the throne, were not killed when their father did not become sultan, this is because they could never aspire to the throne.

Name	Birth date/place	Parent(s)		Spouse(s)	Children	Death date/place
Name	Birth date/place	Father	Mother	Spouse(s)	Children	Death date/place
Hund Şehzade	c. 1422	Orhan Çelebi	unknown	Barsbay (m. 1437; died 1438)		July 1455 (aged 32–33); Cairo, Mamluk Sultanate
Hund Şehzade	c. 1422	Orhan Çelebi	unknown	Sayf ad-Din Jaqmaq (m. 1438; div. 1450)	four sons, one of them was Ahmed	July 1455 (aged 32–33); Cairo, Mamluk Sultanate
Hund Şehzade	c. 1422	Orhan Çelebi	unknown	Barsbay Bujashi		July 1455 (aged 32–33); Cairo, Mamluk Sultanate
Hümaşah Sultan	c. 1543; Manisa, Ottoman Empire	Şehzade Mehmed	Aya Hatun	Ferhad Pasha (m. 1566; died 1575)	Sultanzade Osman Bey (1571—1626)	Istanbul, Ottoman Empire
Hümaşah Sultan	c. 1543; Manisa, Ottoman Empire	Şehzade Mehmed	Aya Hatun	Lala Mustafa Pasha (m. 1575; died 1580)	Sultanzade Abdülbaki Bey	Istanbul, Ottoman Empire
Hümaşah Sultan	c. 1543; Manisa, Ottoman Empire	Şehzade Mehmed	Aya Hatun	Gazi Mehmed Pasha (m. 1581)		Istanbul, Ottoman Empire
Münire Sultan	5 April 1880; Dolmabahçe Palace, Istanbul, Ottoman Empire	Şehzade Ahmed Kemaleddin	Sezadil Hanım	Mehmed Salih Pasha (m. 1907; died 1913)	Sultanzade Ahmed Kemaleddin Bey	7 October 1939 (aged 59); Nice, France
Naciye Sultan	25 October 1896; Feriye Palace, Istanbul, Ottoman Empire	Şehzade Selim Süleyman	Ayşe Tarzıter Hanım	Enver Pasha (m. 1911; died 1922)	Mahpeyker Hanımsultan; Türkan Hanımsultan; Sultanzade Ali Bey; Rana Hanımsultan	4 December 1957 (aged 61); Istanbul, Turkey
Naciye Sultan	25 October 1896; Feriye Palace, Istanbul, Ottoman Empire	Şehzade Selim Süleyman	Ayşe Tarzıter Hanım	Mehmed Kamil Pasha (m. 1923; div. 1949)	Rana Hanımsultan (25 February 1926 – 14 April 2008)	4 December 1957 (aged 61); Istanbul, Turkey
Gevheri Sultan	30 November 1904; Çamlıca Mansion, Istanbul, Ottoman Empire	Şehzade Mehmed Seyfeddin	Nervaliter Hanım			10 December 1980 (aged 76); Taksim Square, Istanbul, Turkey
Şükriye Sultan	24 February 1906; Çamlıca Mansion, Istanbul, Ottoman Empire	Şehzade Yusuf Izzeddin	Leman Hanım	Şehzade Mehmed Şerafeddin (m. 1923; div. 1927)		1 April 1972 (aged 66); Istanbul, Turkey
Şükriye Sultan	24 February 1906; Çamlıca Mansion, Istanbul, Ottoman Empire	Şehzade Yusuf Izzeddin	Leman Hanım	Ahmad Al-Jaber Al-Sabah (m. 1935; div. 1937)		1 April 1972 (aged 66); Istanbul, Turkey
Şükriye Sultan	24 February 1906; Çamlıca Mansion, Istanbul, Ottoman Empire	Şehzade Yusuf Izzeddin	Leman Hanım	Mehmed Şefik Ziya (m. 1949)		1 April 1972 (aged 66); Istanbul, Turkey
Mihrişah Sultan	1 June 1916; Beşiktaş Palace, Istanbul, Ottoman Empire	Şehzade Yusuf Izzeddin	Leman Hanım	Şehzade Ömer Faruk (m. 1948; div. 1959)		25 January 1987 (aged 70); Istanbul, Turkey
Mihrişah Sultan	1 June 1916; Beşiktaş Palace, Istanbul, Ottoman Empire	Şehzade Yusuf Izzeddin	Leman Hanım	Şevket Arslanoğlu		25 January 1987 (aged 70); Istanbul, Turkey
Behiye Sultan	20 September 1881; Çırağan Palace, Istanbul, Ottoman Empire	Şehzade Mehmed Selaheddin	Naziknaz Hanım	Hafız Hakkı Pasha (m. 1910; died 1915)		5 March 1948 (aged 66); Cairo, Kingdom of Egypt
Nemika Sultan	9 March 1888; Yıldız Palace, Istanbul, Ottoman Empire	Şehzade Mehmed Selim	Iryale Hanım	Ali Kenan Bey (m. 1911; died 1962)	Fatma Fethiye Hanımsultan; Sultanzade Ibrahim; Sultanzade Kazim; Emine Satia Hanımsultan	6 September 1969 (aged 81); Istanbul, Turkey
Dürriye Sultan	3 August 1905; Dolmabahçe Palace, Istanbul, Ottoman Empire	Şehzade Mehmed Ziyaeddin	Ünsiyar Hanım	Sultanzade Mehmed Cahid Bey (m. 1920; div. 1921)		16 July 1922 (aged 16); Istanbul, Ottoman Empire
Rukiye Sultan	11 November 1906; Dolmabahçe Palace, Istanbul, Ottoman Empire	Şehzade Mehmed Ziyaeddin	Ünsiyar Hanım	Sokolluzade Abdülbaki Ihsan Bey (m. 1924)	Emel Nuricihan Hanımsultan	20 February 1927 (aged 20); Budapest, Kingdom of Hungary
Lütfiye Sultan	20 March 1910; Dolmabahçe Palace, Istanbul, Ottoman Empire	Şehzade Mehmed Ziyaeddin	Perizad Hanım	Hasan Kemal Bey (m. 1932)	Sultanzade Ahmed Reşid Bey; Sultanzade Reşad Bey; Perizad Hanımsultan	11 June 1997 (aged 87); Riyadh, Saudi Arabia
Mihrimah Sultan	11 November 1922; Haydarpasha Villa, Istanbul, Turkey	Şehzade Mehmed Ziyaeddin	Neşemend Hanım	Prince Nayef bin Abdullah (m. 1940; died 1983)	Prince Ali bin Nayef; Prince Asem bin Nayef	30 March 2000 (aged 77); Amman, Jordan
Mukbile Sultan	19 September 1911; Dolmabahçe Palace, Istanbul, Ottoman Empire	Şehzade Ömer Hilmi	Gülnev Hanım	Ali Vâsib (m. 1931; died 1983)	Osman Selaheddin Osmanoğlu	21 May 1995 (aged 83); Istanbul, Turkey
Neslişah Sultan	25 December 1925; Budapest, Kingdom of Hungary	Şehzade Mehmed Abdülkadir	Meziyet Hanım	Avni Reda Bey (m. 1953; div. 1969)	Salih Reda Bey; Ömer Reda Bey	30 May 2014 (aged 88); Istanbul, Turkey
Neslişah Sultan	25 December 1925; Budapest, Kingdom of Hungary	Şehzade Mehmed Abdülkadir	Meziyet Hanım	Mehmed Şefik Ziya (died 1980)		30 May 2014 (aged 88); Istanbul, Turkey
Nermin Sultan	27 January 1923; Üsküdar Palace, Istanbul, Turkey	Şehzade Mahmud Şevket	Adile Hanımsultan			7 November 1998 (aged 75); Bagnols-sur-Cèze, France

=== Daughters of Ottoman princesses ===
When a sultana gave birth to a daughter, she received the title of hanimsultan (Sultana madam).

Name	Birth date/place	Parent(s)		Spouse(s)	Children	Death date/place
Name	Birth date/place	Father	Mother	Spouse(s)	Children	Death date/place
Ayşe Sultan	25 August 1547; Istanbul, Ottoman Empire	Rüstem Pasha	Mihrimah Sultan	Şemiz Ahmed Pasha (m. 1561; died 1580)	Sultanzade Abdurrahman Bey (died 1596/1597); Sultanzade Mehmed Bey (died 1593); Sultanzade Şehid Mustafa Pasha (died 1593); Sultanzade Osman Bey (died 1590–91); Sultanzade Mahmud Pasha (died 1602); Saliha Hanımsultan[3] (1561–1580); Safiye Hanımsultan; Hatice Sultan; Ayşe Hanımsultan; Fülane Hanımsultan	c. 1598 (aged 50–51); Istanbul, Ottoman Empire
Ayşe Sultan	25 August 1547; Istanbul, Ottoman Empire	Rüstem Pasha	Mihrimah Sultan	Feridun Ahmed Bey (m. 1582; died 1583)		c. 1598 (aged 50–51); Istanbul, Ottoman Empire
Ayşe Sultan	25 August 1547; Istanbul, Ottoman Empire	Rüstem Pasha	Mihrimah Sultan	Aziz Mahmud Hudayi (m. 1590)		c. 1598 (aged 50–51); Istanbul, Ottoman Empire
Seniye Hanımsultan	4 October 1843; Istanbul, Ottoman Empire	Ahmed Fethi Pasha	Atiye Sultan	Hüseyin Hüsnü Pasha (m. 1860; died 1899)		c. 1913 (aged 69–70); Istanbul, Ottoman Empire
Hayriye Hanımsultan	c. 1846; Istanbul, Ottoman Empire	Damat Mehmed Ali Pasha	Adile Sultan	Ali Rıza Bey (m. 1866)		26 July 1869 (aged 22–23); Istanbul, Ottoman Empire
Feride Hanımsultan	30 April 1847; Istanbul, Ottoman Empire	Ahmed Fethi Pasha	Atiye Sultan	Mahmud Nedim Pasha (m. 1868; died 1904)	Mehmed Saib Bey	December 1920 (aged 73); Istanbul, Ottoman Empire
Adile Hanımsultan	12 November 1900; Ortaköy Palace, Istanbul, Ottoman Empire	Mehmed Kemaleddin Pasha	Naime Sultan	Şehzade Mahmud Şevket (m. 1922; div. 1928)	Nermin Sultan	February 1979 (aged 78); Cairo, Egypt
Adile Hanımsultan	12 November 1900; Ortaköy Palace, Istanbul, Ottoman Empire	Mehmed Kemaleddin Pasha	Naime Sultan	Orhan El-Bekri (m. 1930)	Ayten El-Bekri; Kubilay El-Bekri; Şermin El-Bekri	February 1979 (aged 78); Cairo, Egypt
Selma Hanımsultan	13 April 1914; Istanbul, Ottoman Empire	Rauf Hayri Bey	Hatice Sultan	Syed Sajid Hussain Ali (m. 1937)	Kenizé Mourad	13 January 1941 (aged 26); Paris, Nazi–occupied France
Mahpeyker Hanımsultan	17 May 1917; Kuruçeşme Palace, Istanbul, Ottoman Empire	Enver Pasha	Naciye Sultan	Fikret Ürgüp (m. 1946; div. 1968)	Hasan Ürgüp	3 April 2000 (aged 82); Istanbul, Turkey
Hümeyra Hanımsultan	4 June 1917; Nişantaşı, Istanbul, Ottoman Empire	İsmail Hakkı Okday	Ulviye Sultan	Fahir Bey (m. 1939; div. 1942)		17 May 2000 (aged 82); Kuşadası, İzmir, Turkey
Hümeyra Hanımsultan	4 June 1917; Nişantaşı, Istanbul, Ottoman Empire	İsmail Hakkı Okday	Ulviye Sultan	Halil Özbaş (m. 1944; died 1963)	İsmail Halil Özbaş; Hanzade Özbaş	17 May 2000 (aged 82); Kuşadası, İzmir, Turkey
Türkan Hanımsultan	4 July 1919; Kuruçeşme Palace, Istanbul, Ottoman Empire	Enver Pasha	Naciye Sultan	Hüveyda Mayatapek (m. 1945; died 1973)	Osman Mayatepek	25 December 1989 (aged 70); Ankara, Turkey

== Sources ==
- Allahverdi, Reyhan Şahin (2016). An Orphan Sultan: Foundations of Şehzade Mehmed's Daughter Hümasah Sultan.
- Bardakçı, Murat (2017). Neslishah: The Last Ottoman Princess. Oxford University Press. ISBN 978-9-774-16837-6.
- Belleten, Volume 17, Issues 65–68. Türk Tarih Kurumu Basımevi. 1953.
- Brookes, Douglas Scott (2010). The Concubine, the Princess, and the Teacher: Voices from the Ottoman Harem. University of Texas Press. ISBN 978-0-292-78335-5.
- Milanlıoğlu, Neval (2011). Emine Naciye Sultan'ın Hayatı (1896-1957).
- Sakaoğlu, Necdet (2008). Bu Mülkün Kadın Sultanları: Vâlide Sultanlar, Hâtunlar, Hasekiler, Kandınefendiler, Sultanefendiler. Oğlak Yayıncılık. ISBN 978-6-051-71079-2.
- Uluçay, M. Çağatay (1992). Padişahların kadınları ve kızları. Ötüken. ISBN 978-975-437-840-5.
- Uluçay, M. Çağatay (2011). Padişahların kadınları ve kızları. Ötüken. ISBN 978-975-437-840-5.
