= Gevherhan Sultan (daughter of Ibrahim) =

Ottoman princess, daughter of Sultan Ibrahim

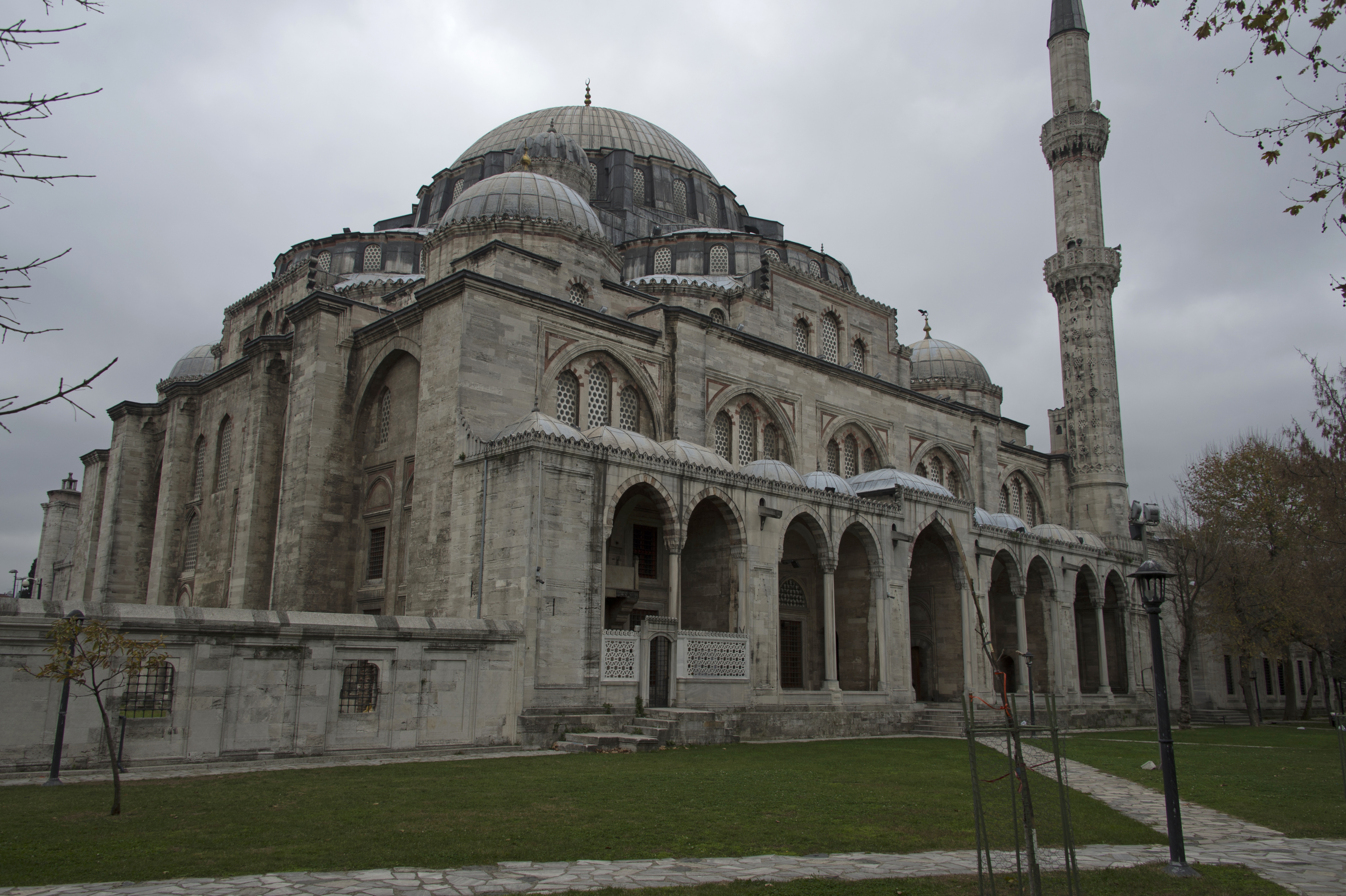
- The tomb of Gevherhan Sultan is located inside the Şehzade Mosque in Istanbul, Turkey.
- Born: c. 1642; Topkapi Palace, Constantinople, Ottoman Empire (modern-day Istanbul, Turkey)
- Died: 27 October 1694 (aged 51–52); Edirne, Ottoman Empire (modern-day Turkey)
- Burial: Şehzade Mosque, Istanbul
- Spouse: Cafer Pasha (m. 1646; died 1647) Çavuşzade Mehmed Pasha (m. 1647; died 1682) Helvacı Yusuf Pasha (m. 1692)
Names
- Turkish: Gevherhan Sultan binti Ibrahim Han
- Dynasty: Ottoman
- Father: Ibrahim I
- Mother: Muazzez Sultan
- Religion: Sunni Islam

Gevherhan Sultan (Ottoman Turkish: کوھرخان سلطان; "Gem of the Khan"; c. 1642 – 27 October 1694) was an Ottoman princess, daughter of Sultan Ibrahim I (r. 1640–1648) and his consort Muazzez Sultan. She was a half-sister of Sultans Mehmed IV (r. 1648–1687) and Suleiman II (r. 1687–1691) and full-sister of Ahmed II (r. 1691–1695).

== Life ==
She was born in 1642 as a daughter of Sultan Ibrahim and his second haseki Muazzez Sultan. Gevherhan Sultan was firstly married, at the age of just four, on 23 November 1646, to one of her father's favorites, Cafer Pasha. The expense of her dowry was covered by the Imperial Treasury at her father's behest.

On the wedding day, the bride was taken to Halil Pasha Palace, situated at Hoca Pasha, which had been allocated to the couple, in a carriage, accompanied by regiments comprising dignitaries. According to some sources, Cafer Pasha didn't marry Gevherhan, but her aunt Atike Sultan.

Said palace was reaffirmed as Gevherhan's property, after the fall of Ibrahim, by the regime of her brother Sultan Mehmed IV.

She was secondly married to Çavuşzade Mehmed Pasha, at a date variously suggested to be, uncertain, as early as 1647 or 1653. He served twice as Grand Admiral, as Vizier and in various other capacities and died in 1681.

In 1672, she was among several figures of the harem to accompany her brother Sultan Mehmed in his Wallachian campaign against Kamianets-Podilskyi.

The princess apparently spent the years following Mehmed Pasha's death at Edirne, – a place of increased interest for her brother Sultan Mehmed and his court – and was married thirdly, on 13 January 1692, at the age of fifty, to Helvacı Yusuf Pasha, Grand Admiral. He would die in 1714, while Gevherhan died in 1694.

== Death ==
By 1693, Gevherhan Sultan had been struck by illness and was resting at Edirne. She died there on 27 October 1694. Her body was brought to Constantinople for a funeral and interred at Şehzade Mosque.

== Debts ==
Following Gevherhan Sultan's demise, the entirety of her wares and properties in Istanbul or Edirne – which included a palace, a yali (waterfront manse), a garden, a bakery, real estate like mills – was confiscated in favour of the imperial treasury.

The late princess is understood to have been in great debt, as is demonstrated by Topkapı Palace archives dating 28 November 1694, a substantial amount of which was owed to her brother Sultan Ahmed II’s consort Rabia Sultan.

Some of the debts mentioned were covered by the allocation of Gevherhan's grants from her hass, that is revenue-producing estates to Asiye Sultan, the infant daughter of Ahmed and Rabia as shown in archives dating 1 December 1694.

== See also ==
- List of Ottoman Princesses

== Sources ==
- Silahdar Findiklili Mehmed Agha (2012). ZEYL-İ FEZLEKE (1065-22 Ca.1106 / 1654-7 Şubat 1695). pp. 1290, 1400, 1580.
- Uluçay, Mustafa Çağatay (2011). Padişahların kadınları ve kızları. Ankara, Ötüken.
- Osmanlıoğlu, Sekan (2018). "Kuzguncuk Asiye Sultan ve Haseki Rabia Sultan Yalıları". Uluslarasi Üsküdar Sempozyumu, no. X.
- Sakaoğlu, Necdet (2008). Bu mülkün kadın sultanları: Vâlide sultanlar, hâtunlar, hasekiler, kadınefendiler, sultanefendiler. Oğlak Yayıncılık. p. 303. ISBN 978-975-329-623-6.
- Doğru, Halime (2006). Lehistan'da bir Osmanlı sultanı: IV.Mehmed'in Kamaniçe-Hotin seferleri ve bir masraf defteri. Kitap Yayınevi. ISBN 9789756051115.
