= Hibetullah Sultan =

Daughter of Sultan Abdul Hamid I (1789–1841)

- Born: 16 March 1789; Topkapı Palace, Constantinople, Ottoman Empire
- Died: 19 September 1841 (aged 52); Kadırga Palace, Constantinople, Ottoman Empire
- Burial: Sultan Mahmud II Mausoleum, Divanyolu, Istanbul
- Spouse: Sultanzade Alaeddin Pasha (m. 1803; died 1812)
- Dynasty: Ottoman
- Father: Abdul Hamid I
- Mother: Şebsefa Kadın
- Religion: Sunni Islam

Hibetullah Sultan (Ottoman Turkish: هبت الله سلطان; 16 March 1789 – 19 September 1841) was an Ottoman princess, the daughter of Sultan Abdul Hamid I, and his consort Şebsefa Kadın. She was the half sister of Sultans Mustafa IV and Mahmud II.

== Early life ==
Hibetullah Sultan was born on 16 March 1789 in the Topkapı Palace. Her father was Sultan Abdul Hamid I, and her mother was Şebsefa Kadın. She was the youngest child of her parents and the youngest child of her father, who died a month after her birth. She had a brother Şehzade Mehmed Nusret, six years elder then her, two sisters, Alemşah Sultan, four years elder then her, and Emine Sultan, one year elder then her. After her father's death in 1789, she and her mother settled in the Old Palace.

== Marriage ==
In 1801, when Hibetullah was twelve years old, her cousin Sultan Selim III betrothed her to their cousin Sultanzade Alaeddin Pasha, the son of Seyyid Ahmed Pasha and Hatice Sultan, daughter of Mustafa III. The marriage took place on 3 February 1803. The couple were given Kadırga Palace as their residence.

In 1808, after the dethronement of her elder half-brother Sultan Mustafa IV, Hibetullah Sultan and her elder half-sister Esma Sultan, who were involved in state affairs, were kept under close surveillance by Sultan Mahmud II, and were forbidden from communicating with outsiders.

Hibetullah had no known child. She was widowed at the age of 23 when Alaeddin Pasha died in 1812. Like the princesses of her generation she didn’t remarry.

After the death of her mother in 1805, all çiftliks of her mother were assigned to her.

== Death ==
Hibetullah Sultan died on 19 September 1841 in the Kadırga Palace, which belonged to her aunt Esma Sultan, and was buried in the mausoleum of her brother Sultan Mahmud II, Divanyolu, Istanbul.

== See also ==
- List of Ottoman princesses

== Sources ==
- Uluçay, Mustafa Çağatay (2011). Padişahların kadınları ve kızları. Ankara, Ötüken.
- Sakaoğlu, Necdet (2008). Bu mülkün kadın sultanları: Vâlide sultanlar, hâtunlar, hasekiler, kadınefendiler, sultanefendiler. Oğlak Yayıncılık. ISBN 978-9-753-29623-6.
