= Adile Sultan (daughter of Mahmud II) =

Ottoman princess (1826–1899)

- Born: 23 May 1826; Constantinople, Ottoman Empire
- Died: 12 February 1899 (aged 72); Constantinople, Ottoman Empire
- Burial: Eyüp, Istanbul, Turkey
- Spouse: Damat Mehmed Ali Pasha (m. 1845; died 1868)
- Issue: Hayriye Hanımsultan; Şadıka Hanımsultan; Sultanzade Ismail Bey; Aliye Hanımsultan
Names
- Turkish: Adile Sultan; Ottoman Turkish: عدیلہ سلطان
- Dynasty: Ottoman
- Father: Mahmud II
- Mother: Zernigar Kadın biological Nevfidan Kadın adoptive
- Religion: Sunni Islam

Adile Sultan (Ottoman Turkish: عدیله سلطان; 23 May 1826 – 12 February 1899) was an Ottoman princess, a Diwan poet, and a philanthropist. She was the daughter of Sultan Mahmud II and half-sister of the Sultans Abdulmejid I and Abdulaziz.

== Early life ==
Adile Sultan was born on 23 May 1826. Her father was Sultan Mahmud II, and her mother was the Fourth Consort Zernigâr Kadın. After her mother's death in 1830, when she was four years old, she was entrusted to the care of her father's First Consort, Nevfidan Kadın.

Adile was educated at the palace. She took lessons in the Quran, Arabic, Persian, music and calligraphy. She took her calligraphy lessons with Ebubekir Mümtaz Efendi, a famous calligrapher of the era. With the education she received, combined with her sensitive personality, she went on to write poems, becoming the only Ottoman princess to do so.

After her father's death in 1839, when she was thirteen years old, her elder half-brother, the new sultan Abdulmejid I, became her guardian.

== Marriage ==
In 1845, her brother Sultan Abdulmejid arranged her marriage to Damat Mehmet Ali Pasha, who had been serving as an advisor in the imperial arsenal. Born in Hemşin, he was the son of Hacı Ömer Agha, the chief agha of Galata. He came to Istanbul at a very young age, where he spent his childhood in the Enderun.

The preparations for the marriage began on 24 March 1845, and the marriage contract was concluded on 27 April in the apartment of the sacred relics, Topkapı Palace. After the ceremony was performed, the trousseau was brought to the Darüssaade Ağa from where it was taken through Tophane Street to Çırağan Palace. The wedding celebrations were delayed until the next summer. The wedding took place on 7 June 1845, and lasted a whole week. On the last day of the celebrations, Adile was taken to Neşatabad Palace located in Defterdarburnu. This palace once belonged to Hatice Sultan, daughter of Sultan Mustafa III.

After the marriage, Mehmet Ali Pasha became commander of the fleet, and served in this position for five times, and afterwards served a short while as Grand Vizier to her brother, Sultan Abdulmejid. The couple had four children together, including one son, Sultanzade Ismail Bey, and three daughters, Hayriye Hanımsultan, Sıdıka Hanımsultan, and Aliye Hanımsultan. Mehmet Ali Pasha died in 1868 during the reign of Adile's younger half-brother, Sultan Abdulaziz. Their only surviving daughter, Hayriye was born in 1846, and died in 1869, a year after her father.

In 1861 her half-brother Abdülaziz, with whom she was not on good terms, ascended the throne. To reconcile with him he introduced him to Edadil Hanim, a lady whom Abdülaziz took as his consort. Adile wrote several components to celebrate their son, Şehzade Mahmud Celaleddin.

== Religiosity ==
Adile Sultan was a religious woman. In about 1845, she became a follower of Sheikh Shumnulu Ali Efendi, and became a member of the Naqshbandi Sufi order. She held meetings of sheikhs and dervishes in the Neşetabad Palace, which also served as a sort of application bureau for poor people who would make their needs known to the princess.

== Charities ==
Adile Sultan had a summerhouse in Validebağ and a palace in Kandilli, the Adile Sultan Palace, both in the Asian part of Istanbul. She left her palace in Kandilli following the death of her husband and moved to the Coastal Palace in Fındıklı. She donated the Adile Sultan Palace to the state on the condition that it be converted into the first secondary high school for girls in the Ottoman Empire. Her wish was fulfilled only in 1916 (due to wars), when the Young Turk activist, statesman, and educator Ahmed Rıza opened the Adile Sultan İnas Mekteb-i Sultanisi ("Adile Sultan Imperial Girls School"), today known as Kandilli Anatolian High School for Girls, although it became not the first, but the second secondary school for girls in the empire. The high school moved to a new building in 1969, and the Adile Sultan Palace burned down in 1986 due to an electrical short-circuit. It was reopened in 2006 as the Sakıp Sabancı Kandilli Education and Culture Center.

== Poetry ==
Adile Sultan was a poet. She followed the divan tradition, writing nazires to Fuzuli, Muhibbî, and Şeyh Gâlib, but she is not outstanding in either feeling or technique. Her life lasted long enough for her to have become a modern poet, but she was faithful to the classic tradition which was still strong, particularly in the palace. She was, however, less successful poet than her contemporaries Leyla Hanım, Fitnat Hanım and Leyla Gülefşan Hanim.

Her poetry, Adile Sultan's Divan, was published in 1996.

== Death ==
Adile Sultan died on 12 February 1899 at the age of seventy-three, the last surviving child of Mahmud. She was interred in the mausoleum of her husband in Eyüp, Istanbul.

== Personality ==
Adile Sultan was a poet who was known for her education and religious perspective. She participated in philanthropic activities and supported charitable organizations. She penned elegies to her husband when he died. Those in her service and in close relations with her always spoke with polite manners. She was also in the habit of smoking the water pipe.

She dressed in a Turkish fashion; gown of heavy fabrics with four flounces, shoes of chamois leather, shawl tied as a sash around her waist, the so-called salta wide-sleeved jacket over this ensemble, on her head something like a fez wrapped in a silk headkerchief pinked along the edges, and onto which she had fastened brooches of emeralds and rubies in the shape of roses, a larger one in the center flanked by two smaller ones. Other than these she wore no jewels or decorations.

== Honour ==
- Order of Charity, 18 January 1879

== Issue ==
Name	Birth	Death	Notes
Hayriye Hanımsultan	June 1846	26 July 1869	married in 1866 to İşkodralızâde Ali Rıza Bey, she had a son and two daughters, but all died in infancy.
Şadıka Hanımsultan	unknown	unknown	died in infancy
Sultanzade Ismail Bey	unknown	unknown	died in infancy
Aliye Hanımsultan	unknown	unknown	died in infancy

== See also ==
- Adile Sultan Palace
- Kandilli Anatolian High School for Girls
- List of Ottoman princesses

== Sources ==
- Brookes, Douglas Scott (2010). The Concubine, the Princess, and the Teacher: Voices from the Ottoman Harem. University of Texas Press. ISBN 978-0-292-78335-5.
- Kolay, Arif (2017-10-15). "Hayırsever, Dindar, Nazik ve Şâire Bir Padişah Kızı: Âdile Sultan". Akademik İncelemeler Dergisi. 12 (2): 1–33. doi:10.17550/akademikincelemeler.306917.
- Uluçay, Mustafa Çağatay (2011). Padişahların kadınları ve kızları. Ankara: Ötüken. ISBN 978-9-754-37840-5.
