= Nevfidan Kadın =

Consort of Mahmud II

- Born: 4 January 1793
- Died: 27 December 1855 (aged 62); Nafizpaşa Palace, Constantinople, Ottoman Empire (now Istanbul, Turkey)
- Burial: Mahmud II Mausoleum, Divanyolu, Istanbul
- Consort: Mahmud II
- Issue: Fatma Sultan; Fatma Sultan (II); Emine Sultan; Şehzade Osman; Emine Sultan (II); Adopted; Adile Sultan
Names
- Turkish: Haciye Pertevpiyale Nevfidan Kadın; Ottoman Turkish: حاجیه پرتوپیاله نوفدان قادین
- House: Ottoman (by marriage)
- Religion: Sunni Islam

Haciye Pertevpiyale Nevfidan Kadın (Ottoman Turkish: حاجیه پرتوپیاله نوفدان قادین; 4 January 1793 – 27 December 1855) was a consort of Sultan Mahmud II of the Ottoman Empire.

== Life ==
Her origin is unknown, but the consorts of the Ottoman sultans were by custom normally concubines of Christian origin, who came to the Ottoman Imperial harem via the Ottoman slave trade, and converted to Islam and given a slave name after their arrival.

She was the chief consort of Ottoman Sultan Mahmud II after the death of the first two. She was already Mahmud's concubine when he was still a Şehzade, and on 4 February 1809, six months after Mahmud acceded to the throne she gave birth to Fatma Sultan, Mahmud II's first child. Her birth, the first in the imperial dynasty after 19 years and just six months after her father acceded to the throne, caused a scandal, as it meant she must have been conceived when Mahmud was still Şehzade and confined to the Kafes, which was forbidden at the time. The princess died on 5 August 1809.

On 30 April 1810, she gave birth to a second daughter, also named Fatma Sultan, who died on 7 May 1825. On 17 June 1813, she gave birth to Şehzade Osman and his twin Emine Sultan; the prince died on 10 April 1814 and the princess in July 1814. On 7 January 1815, she gave birth to Emine Sultan, but the princess died on 25 September 1816. Her children all died young, and in 1830, after the death of Adile Sultan's mother Zernigar Kadın, Adile was entrusted in her care by Mahmud.

In 1845, Adile married Damat Mehmed Ali Pasha, who had been serving as an advisor in the Imperial Arsenal. After the wedding, Adile went to live at Neşatâbad Palace, which was allocated to her in Fındıklı, Rize. Adile who was a poetess by avocation, would later dedicate poems to her adoptive mother, whom she called her own mother.

After Mahmud's death, she asked the new sultan, Abdulmejid I, for permission to go on Hajj, her permission was granted and she was the second consort of Sultan Mahmud after Hoşyar Kadın to go on pilgrimage to Mecca, returning to Istanbul in 1842. She was thus known by the title Hacıye. She had a seal commissioned for the occasion: "His Heavenly Majesty Sultan Mahmud, Her Highness Haciye Nevfîdan Baş Kadın”. She was also reportedly beloved by her stepson Abdulmejid.

== Charities ==
Nevfidan Kadın was very pious and a philanthropist, and built foundations for the poor in Mecca and Medina. She was described as a compassionate and merciful woman, who the most pious and charitable woman among all of Mahmud's consorts, so much that she received utmost respect from her stepsons, Abdulmejid and Abdulaziz.

In addition to her piety and compassion, she was also involved in charities. She commissioned the construction of a mosque in her name in Eminönü. She also repaired the Çürük Mosque in Fatih. Moreover, she also established a primary school in Üsküdar in her name, and a fountain in the same district. In addition to that, she also constructed a cistern in Fatih.

Sultan Abdulaziz, her step-son, who became the Sultan in 1861 after the death of his half-brother Abdulmejid, named one of his ships the Pertevpiyale in her honour.

== Death ==
Nevfidan Kadın died on 27 December 1855 in Nafizpaşa Palace located in Beylerbeyi. She was buried in the tomb of her husband Sultan Mahmud at Mahmud II Mausoleum in Divayolu.

== Issue ==
By Mahmud II, Nevfidan had a son and four daughters:

- Fatma Sultan (4 February 1809 – 5 August 1809). Her birth, the first in the imperial dynasty after 19 years and just six months after her father's accession to the throne, caused scandal, as it meant she must have been conceived when Mahmud was still Şehzade and confined in the Kafes, which was forbidden at the time. She died of smallpox and was buried in the Nuruosmaniye Mosque.
- Fatma Sultan (30 April 1810 – 7 May 1825). She died of smallpox and was buried in the türbe of Nakşidil Sultan.
- Emine Sultan (12 June 1813 – July 1814). Twin sister of Şehzade Osman. She was buried in the Nurosmaniye Mosque.
- Şehzade Osman (12 June 1813 – 10 April 1814). Twin brother of Emine Sultan. He was buried in the Nurosmaniye Mosque.
- Emine Sultan (7 January 1815 – 24 September 1816). She died in Beylerbeyi Palace in a fire. She was buried in the Yahya Efendi mausoleum.

After her children death, in 1830 Nevfidan was entrusted to raise one of Mahmud's other daughters who had just lost her mother:

- Adile Sultan (23 May 1826 – 12 February 1899). Her natural mother was Zernigar Kadın, dead on 1830. She married once and had a son and three daughters.

== Sources ==
- Kolay, Arif (2017). Hayırsever, Dindar, Nazik ve Şâire Bir Padişah Kızı: Âdile Sultan.
- Sakaoğlu, Necdet (2008). Bu Mülkün Kadın Sultanları. Beyoğlu, İstanbul : Oğlak Yayıncılık ve Reklamcılık. ISBN 978-9-753-29299-3.
- Uluçay, Mustafa Çağatay (2011). Padişahların kadınları ve kızları. Ankara: Ötüken. ISBN 978-9-754-37840-5.
