= Şehzade Mahmud Celaleddin =

Ottoman prince, son of Sultan Abdülaziz

- Born: 14 November 1862; Dolmabahçe Palace, Istanbul, Ottoman Empire
- Died: 16 September 1888 (aged 25); Feriye Palace, Istanbul, Ottoman Empire
- Burial: New Mosque, Istanbul
- Spouse: Neylan Ahu Hanım
Names
- Turkish: Şehzade Mahmud Celaleddin; Ottoman Turkish: شهزادہ محمود جلال الدین
- House: Ottoman
- Father: Abdulaziz
- Mother: Edadil Kadın
- Religion: Sunni Islam
- Military career
- Allegiance: Ottoman Empire
- Branch: Ottoman Navy
- Service years: 1863–1888 (active service)
- Rank: See list

Şehzade Mahmud Celaleddin Efendi (Ottoman Turkish: شهزادہ محمود جلال لدین; 14 November 1862 – 1 September 1888) was an Ottoman prince, son of Sultan Abdulaziz and his consort Edadil Kadın.

== Early life ==
Celaleddin was born on 14 November 1862 in the Dolmabahçe Palace. His father was Abdulaziz, son of Mahmud II and Pertevniyal Sultan, and his mother was Edadil Kadın. He had a full sister, Emine Sultan, four years younger than him, who died in infancy. He was the favorite nephew of Adile Sultan, who had brought his parents together, and she wrote several poems to celebrate him.

His circumcision took place on 20 June 1870 in the Dolmabahçe Palace. Other princes who were circumcised along with Celaleddin included Şehzade Selim Süleyman and Şehzade Mehmed Vahideddin, sons of Sultan Abdulmejid I; Şehzade Mehmed Selaheddin, son of Murad V; Şehzade Yusuf Izzeddin, Celaleddin's brother; and Sultanzade Alaeddin Bey, son of Münire Sultan, daughter of Abdulmejid I.

== Navy career ==
In 1863, at a young age, he was registered in the Ottoman Navy. He was given the rank of sergeant and appointed to the First Division of Mahmudiye Imperial Galleons with three warehouses. In 1870, he was promoted to the rank of lieutenant commander. In August 1872, a room was allocated to him in the headquarters of the Ministry of the Navy, and a silver-plated sword presented to him. In September 1872, he visited İzmit. In February 1872 or March 1873, he was promoted to captain. On 9 July 1873, he was promoted to rear admiral. On 23 December 1874, he was promoted to vice admiral.

== Personal life ==
His only wife was Neylan Ahu Hanım. She was an Abkhazian from the Marshania princely family of Abkhazia, Georgia, Caucasus Viceroyalty, Russian Empire. They did not have children.

He had been allocated apartments in the Feriye Palace. He also owned a mansion known as "Bahçe Mansion". He was a pianist and flautist by avocation.

== Later life and death ==
Abdulaziz was deposed by his ministers on 30 May 1876; his nephew Murad V became the Sultan. He was transferred to the Feriye Palace the next day. Celaleddin followed him there. On 4 June 1876, Abdulaziz died under mysterious circumstances.

Celaleddin died on 1 September 1888 in the Feriye Palace, and was buried in the New Mosque, Istanbul.

== Honours ==
Styles of Şehzade Mahmud Celaleddin
- Reference style: His Imperial Highness
- Spoken style: Your Imperial Highness

- Order of the House of Osman, Jeweled, 1872
- Order of the Medjidie, Jeweled

=== Military appointments ===
==== Military ranks and naval appointments ====
- 1863: Sergeant, Ottoman Navy
- 1870: Lieutenant Commander, Ottoman Navy
- February 1872 or March 1873: Captain, Ottoman Navy
- 9 July 1873: Rear Admiral, Ottoman Navy
- 23 December 1874: Vice Admiral, Ottoman Navy

== Sources ==
- Brookes, Douglas Scott (2010). The Concubine, the Princess, and the Teacher: Voices from the Ottoman Harem. University of Texas Press. ISBN 978-0-292-78335-5.
- Genç, Füsun (2015). "Kısa Süren Bir Ömür: Şehzade Mahmud Celâleddin Efendi (1862-1888)". Academia.edu (in Turkish).
- Korkmaz, Mehmet (2019-12-30). "Denizin Saraylıları: Bahriye'de Osmanlı Şehzadeleri". Hazine-i Evrak Arşiv ve Tarih Araştırmaları Dergisi (in Turkish). 1 (1): 42–65.
- Uçan, Lâle (2019). Son Halife Abdülmecid Efendi'nin Hayatı - Şehzâlik, Veliahtlık ve Halifelik Yılları (PDF) (PhD Thesis). Istanbul University Institute of Social Sciences.
