= Atike Sultan (daughter of Ahmed I) =

Ottoman princess (c.1614–1674)

- Born: c. 1614; Constantinople, Ottoman Empire
- Died: c. 1674 (aged 59–60); Constantinople, Ottoman Empire
- Burial: Ibrahim I Mausoleum, Hagia Sophia Mosque
- Spouse: Musahıp Cafer Pasha (m. 1633; died 1647) Koca Kenan Pasha (m. 1648; died 1652) Doğancı Yusuf Pasha (m. 1652; died 1670)
Names
- Turkish: Burnaz Atike Sultan; Ottoman Turkish: عاتکه سلطان
- Dynasty: Ottoman
- Father: Ahmed I
- Mother: possibly Kösem Sultan
- Religion: Sunni Islam

Burnaz Atike Sultan (Ottoman Turkish: عاتکه سلطان; c. 1614, Constantinople – c. 1674, Constantinople) was an Ottoman princess, daughter of Sultan Ahmed I. She was a sister of Osman II, Murad IV and Ibrahim I.

== Life ==
=== Early life ===
Burnaz Atike Sultan was born in Constantinople, in the Topkapı Palace, around 1614. She was a daughter of Ottoman Sultan Ahmed I possibly by Kösem Sultan.

After the death of her father in 1617, she resided in the Old Palace with her sisters and the concubine mothers of children of the late sultan. She would have stayed there until her marriage if she was the daughter of a concubine, or until the ascent of her brother Murad IV in 1623.

=== Marriages ===
In 1633, she married Musahıp Cafer Pasha (died 1647). By 1639, during the reign of her brother sultan Murad IV, her stipend was 330 aspers a day. Upon the death of her husband, she was married to Koca Kenan Pasha in 1648 After he in turn died in 1652, she was married to Doğancı Yusuf Pasha that same year. He died in 1670. In 1683, she commissioned a fountain (çeşme) between Salacak and Doğancılar.

It is unknown if she had children by these marriages, however she was the "spiritual mother" of the future Mihnea III of Wallachia and she cared for him while he stayed at Istanbul as an adoptive son.

Turhan Sultan, the first Haseki Sultan of Ibrahim I, and the mother of Mehmed IV, who had been a gift from Atike to Valide Kösem Sultan, had been trained by Atike herself. She was called Turhan's and Mehmed IV's “governess” and she cared for them as if she was her mother and his grandmother.

== Death ==
Atike Sultan died in circa 1674. She is buried in the mausoleum of her brother Sultan Ibrahim, in Hagia Sophia, Constantinople.

== In popular culture ==
In the Turkish TV series Muhteşem Yüzyıl: Kösem, Atike Sultan is portrayed by Turkish actress Ece Çeşmioğlu. She is represented here as the youngest daughter of Ahmed I and Kösem Sultan and twin of Ibrahim I.

== See also ==
- List of Ottoman princesses

== Sources ==
- Sakaoğlu, Necdet (2008). Bu mülkün kadın sultanları: Vâlide sultanlar, hâtunlar, hasekiler, kadınefendiler, sultanefendiler. Oğlak Yayıncılık. ISBN 978-9-753-29623-6.
- Uluçay, Mustafa Çağatay (2011). Padişahların kadınları ve kızları. Ankara: Ötüken. ISBN 978-9-754-37840-5.
