= Edadil Kadın =

Consort of Ottoman Sultan Abdülaziz

- Born: 1845; Adler, Principality of Abkhazia, Ottoman Empire
- Died: 12 December 1875 (aged 29–30); Dolmabahçe Palace, Istanbul, Ottoman Empire
- Burial: Sultan Mahmud II mausoleum, Çemberlitaş, Fatih, Istanbul
- Spouse: Abdulaziz (m. 1861)
- Issue: Şehzade Mahmud Celaleddin; Emine Sultan
Names
- Turkish: Edadil Kadın; Ottoman Turkish: ادادل قادین
- House: Aredba (by birth); Ottoman (by marriage)
- Father: Tandal Aredba Bey
- Religion: Sunni Islam

Edadil Kadın (Ottoman Turkish: ادادل قادین; 1845 - 12 December 1875; meaning "The elegance of the heart") was a consort of Sultan Abdulaziz of the Ottoman Empire.

== Life ==
She was Abkhazian and was the daughter of Prince Aredba Tandal Bey. She had at least one brother. She entered palace service at a young age, where she was especially liked by Pertevniyal Sultan, Abdülaziz's mother and Valide Sultan. Edadil Kadın was presented to Abdulaziz after his accession to the throne by his half-sister, Adile Sultan, as a token of reconciliation between brother and sister. She was described as beautiful, with brown hair and light blue eyes.

She married Abdulaziz in 1861 in the Dolmabahçe Palace, after his accession to the throne, and was given the title of "Second Kadın". A year after the marriage, on 14 November 1862, she gave birth to her first child, a son, Şehzade Mahmud Celaleddin.

Four years later, on 30 November 1866, she gave birth to her second child, a daughter, Emine Sultan, who died on 23 January 1867.

== Death ==
Edadil died on 12 December 1875 in the Dolmabahçe Palace, a year before Abdulaziz's death. She had been greatly saddened by her brother's premature death, and was buried in the mausoleum of Sultan Mahmud II, located at Divan Yolu street.

== Issue ==
Name	Birth	Death	Notes
Şehzade Mahmud Celaleddin	14 November 1862	1 September 1888	married once without issue
Emine Sultan	30 November 1866	23 January 1867	died in infancy in Dolmabahçe Palace; buried in the tomb of Mahmud II

== See also ==
- Kadın (title)
- Ottoman Imperial Harem
- List of consorts of the Ottoman sultans

== Sources ==
- Brookes, Douglas Scott (2010). The Concubine, the Princess, and the Teacher: Voices from the Ottoman Harem. University of Texas Press. ISBN 978-0-292-78335-5.
- Sakaoğlu, Necdet (2008). Bu mülkün kadın sultanları: Vâlide sultanlar, hâtunlar, hasekiler, kadınefendiler, sultanefendiler. Oğlak Yayıncılık. ISBN 978-9-753-29623-6.
- Uçan, Lâle (2019). Son Halife Abdülmecid Efendi'nin Hayatı - Şehzâlik, Veliahtlık ve Halifelik Yılları (PDF) (PhD Thesis). Istanbul University Institute of Social Sciences.
- Uluçay, Mustafa Çağatay (2011). Padişahların kadınları ve kızları. Ankara: Ötüken. ISBN 978-9-754-37840-5.
