= Hayriye Hanımsultan =

Ottoman princess, daughter of Damat Mehmed Ali Pasha and Adile Sultan

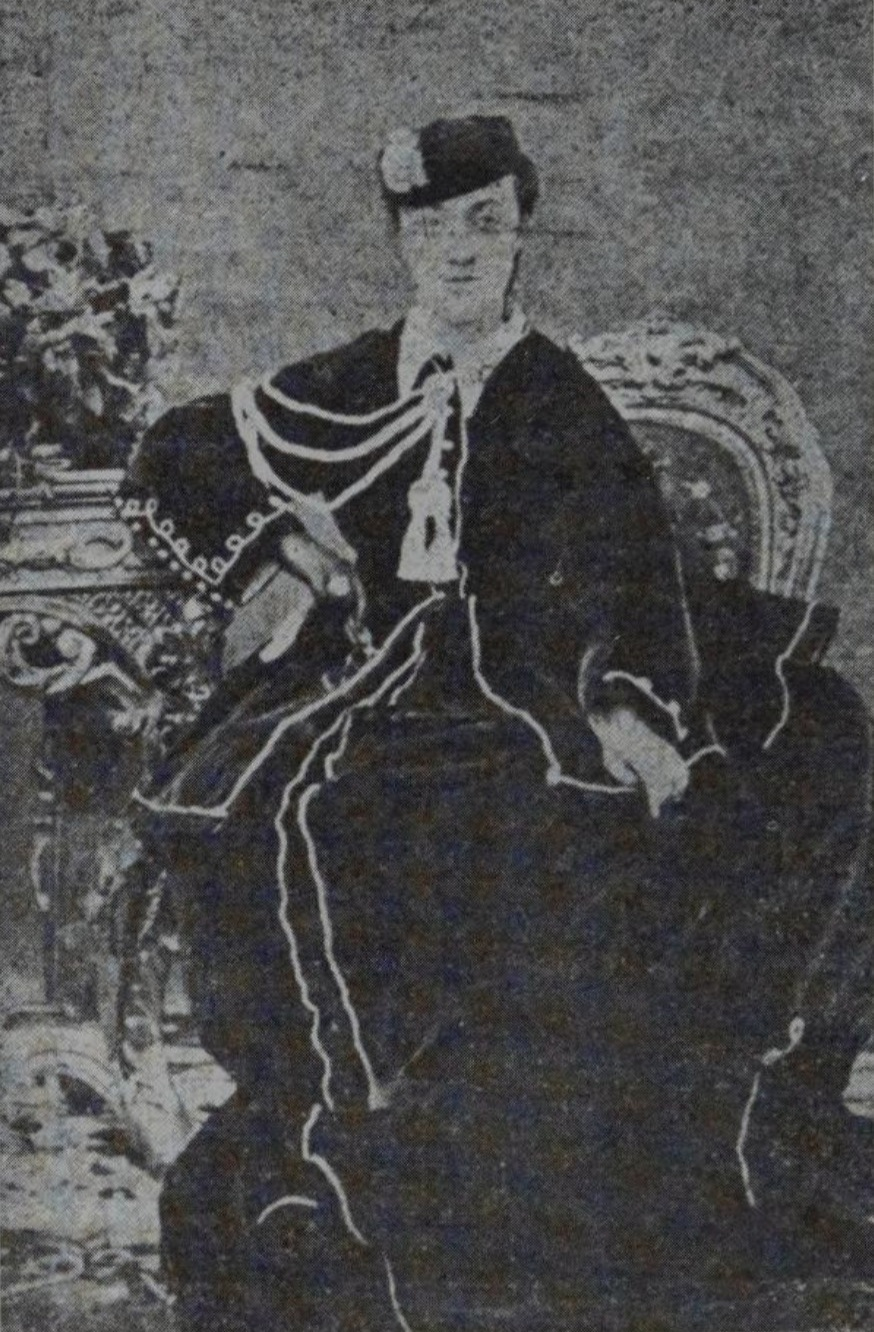
- Born: June 1846; Constantinople, Ottoman Empire
- Died: 26 July 1869 (aged 23); Constantinople, Ottoman Empire
- Burial: Damat Mehmed Ali Pasha Mausoleum, Eyüp, Istanbul
- Spouse: Ali Rıza Bey (m. 1866)
- Issue: Two sons A daughter
Names
- Turkish: Hayriye Hanımsultan; Ottoman Turkish: خیریه خانم سلطان
- Father: Damat Mehmed Ali Pasha
- Mother: Adile Sultan
- Religion: Sunni Islam

Hayriye Hanımsultan (Ottoman Turkish: خیریه خانم سلطان; June 1846 – 26 July 1869) was an Ottoman princess, the daughter of Adile Sultan and Damat Mehmed Ali Pasha.

== Biography ==
Hayriye Hanımsultan was born in June 1846. Her father was Damat Mehmed Ali Pasha, son of Elhac Ömer Agha, and her mother was Adile Sultan, daughter of Sultan Mahmud II and Zernigâr Hanım. She had three full siblings, Sultanzade Ismail Bey, Şadıka Hanımsultan, Aliye Hanımsultan, all of whom died in infancy. She had an older half-brother, Mahmud Edhem Pasha, who married Sultan Abdulmejid I's daughter, Refia Sultan, and an older half-sister, Hatice Hanım. She took her piano lessons from Turkish composer, poet and writer Leyla Saz.

On 10 June 1865, she was betrothed to Ahmed Rıfat Bey, son of Mehmed Kani Pasha. However, six months later the engagement was broken off. According to one source, Kani Pasha, who was known for his arrogance, didn't want to present an expensive gift to the princess. According to another source, she was in love with Ali Rıza Bey, son of İşkodralı Mustafa Şerif Pasha. After the engagement ended, Ahmed Rıfat Bey's military service was terminated. He was then sent to Saint Petersburg.

On 17 April 1866, she married Ali Rıza Bey. The wedding took place on 22 April 1866 in the Kuruçeşme Palace. The couple were given a villa in Çamlıca as their residence. She had two sons and a daughter, all of whom died in infancy; she also suffered several miscarriages. After her father's death in 1868, she built a convent (tekke) near his mausoleum in Eyüp.

She died of tuberculosis on 26 July 1869, and was buried in the mausoleum of her father.

== Ancestry ==
Ancestors of Hayriye Hanımsultan

8. Elhac Kara Ali Agha
4. Elhac Ömer Agha
9. Havva Hanım
2. Damat Mehmed Ali Pasha
1. Hayriye Hanımsultan
12. Abdul Hamid I
6. Mahmud II
13. Nakşidil Sultan
3. Adile Sultan
7. Zernigâr Hanım

== Sources ==
- Sunay, Serap (2015). Damat Mehmed Ali Paşa'nın Hayatı ve Siyasi Mücadelesi (1813-1868) (PhD Thesis) (in Turkish). Afyon Kocatepe University Institute of Social Sciences. Archived from the original on 2023-04-04.
