= Şebsefa Kadın =

Consort of Ottoman Sultan Abdul Hamid I (c.1766-c.1805)

- Born: c. 1766
- Died: c. 1805 (aged 38–39); Constantinople, Ottoman Empire (modern-day Istanbul, Turkey)
- Burial: Şebsefa Kadın Mosque, Istanbul
- Consort: Abdul Hamid I
- Issue: Şehzade Mehmed Nusret; Alemşah Sultan; Emine Sultan; Hibetullah Sultan
Names
- Turkish: Fatma Şebsefa Kadın; Ottoman Turkish: فاطمہ شب صفا قادین
- Religion: Sunni Islam

Fatma Şebsefa Kadın (Turkish pronunciation: [ʃebsefa kʰadɯn]; Ottoman Turkish: شب صفا قادین; called also Şebisefa, Şebsafa or Şebisafa; c. 1766 – c. 1805) was a consort of Sultan Abdul Hamid I of the Ottoman Empire.

== As imperial consort ==
Her origin is unconfirmed, but the consorts of the Ottoman sultans were by custom normally concubines of Christian origin, who came to the Ottoman Imperial harem via the Ottoman slave trade, and converted to Islam and were given a slave name after their arrival. Fatma Şebsefa Kadın was placed as concubine in the harem of Abdul Hamid, and was given the title of "Altıncı Kadın", "Sixth Consort". She was called also Şebsafa, Şebisafa or Şebisafa Kadin. On 20 September 1782, she gave birth to her first child, a son, Şehzade Sultan Mehmed Nusret, who died at the age of three on 23 October 1785.

Two years later on 11 October 1784, she gave birth to her second child, a daughter, Alemşah Sultan, who died at the age of one, on 10 March 1786. Three years later on 4 February 1788, she gave birth to her third child, a daughter, Emine Sultan, who died at the age of about three on 9 March 1791.

In 1788, Şebsefa became pregnant with her fourth child. In January 1789, Captain David G. Sutherland noted the following about the Sultan with reference to her:

...he has attached himself to one. His happy favourite is now pregnant for the fourth time, and such is the attention paid her, that the vessels in the harbour are obliged to suspend the regular method of carrying on duty, and are not permitted to fire a musket, nor to strike the bell, nor even to give the word of command in a loud voice.

On 16 March 1789, she gave birth to a daughter, Hibetullah Sultan. She was widowed after Abdul Hamid's death a month later, after which she settled in the Old Palace.

== Properties ==
In 1798, Şebsefa acquired the Depecik çiftlık of Cihanzade Hüseyin Bey in Aydın Güzelhisar for 33,500 kuruş, and also owned agricultural land in the vicinity of Thessaloniki, apart from a pension out of the funds of the Istanbul customs. After her death, all the çiftlıks were assigned to her daughter Hibetullah Sultan.

== Charities ==
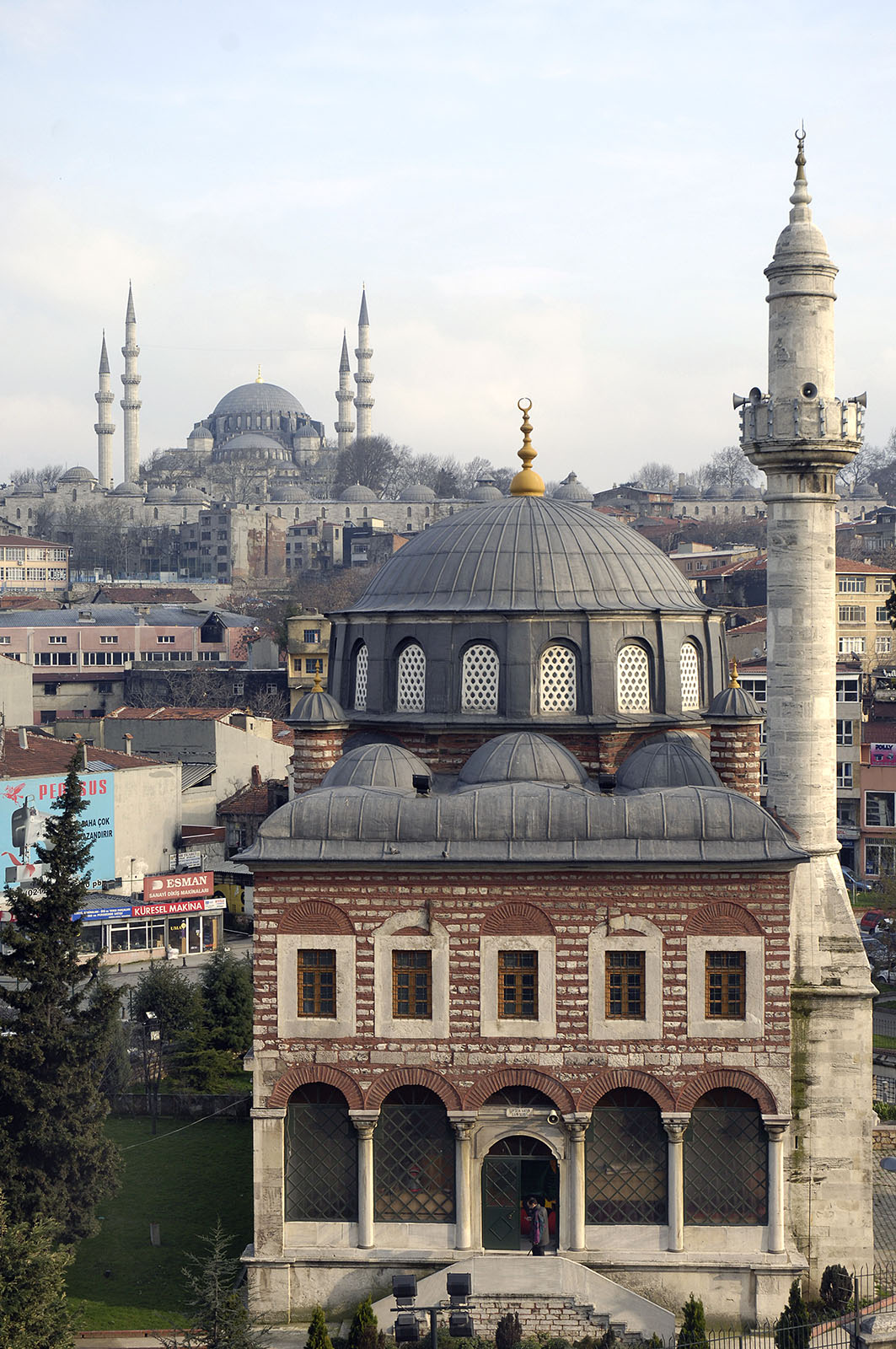
Şebsafa Kadın Mosque from high

Şebsefa is noted for the foundation bearing her name in the Istanbul area of Zeyrek, established in 1787 according to the inscription over the entrance to the mosque. Originally built on different levels, the foundation consists of mosque, primary school and fountain, along with the grave of the foundress. An endowment, dated 1805, specifies that the school was also to be open to girls, a provision which has earned Şebsefa the reputation of a pioneer in Ottoman female education.

She contrived the mosque in the memory of her son Şehzade Mehmed Nusret who died as a child.

== Death ==
Şebsefa Kadın died in 1805, and was buried in her own mosque located in Zeyrek, Istanbul.

== Issue ==
Together with Abdul Hamid, Şebsefa had four children, a son and three daughters:

- Şehzade Mehmed Nusret (20 September 1782 – 23 October 1785, buried in Tomb of Abdul Hamid I);
- Alemşah Sultan (11 October 1784 – 10 March 1786, buried in Tomb of Abdul Hamid I);
- Emine Sultan (4 February 1788 – 9 March 1791, buried in Tomb of Abdul Hamid I);
- Hibetullah Sultan (16 March 1789 – 18 September 1841, buried in Tomb of Mahmud II), married 3 February 1803 her cousin Sultanzade Alaeddin Pasha (died at Scutari, January 1812), son of Hatice Sultan and Seyid Ahmed Pasha;

== See also ==
- Kadın (title)
- Ottoman Imperial Harem
- List of consorts of the Ottoman sultans

== Sources ==
- Uluçay, M. Çağatay (2011). Padişahların kadınları ve kızları. Ötüken. ISBN 978-9-754-37840-5.
- Sakaoğlu, Necdet (2008). Bu Mülkün Kadın Sultanları: Vâlide Sultanlar, Hâtunlar, Hasekiler, Kandınefendiler, Sultanefendiler. Oğlak Yayıncılık. ISBN 978-6-051-71079-2.
- Sarıcaoğlu, Fikret (1997). Hatt-ı Humayunlarına göre Bir Padişah'ın Portresi: Sultan I. Abdülhamid (1774-1789).
