= Damat Mehmed Ali Pasha =

Grand Vizier of the Ottoman Empire from 1852 to 1853

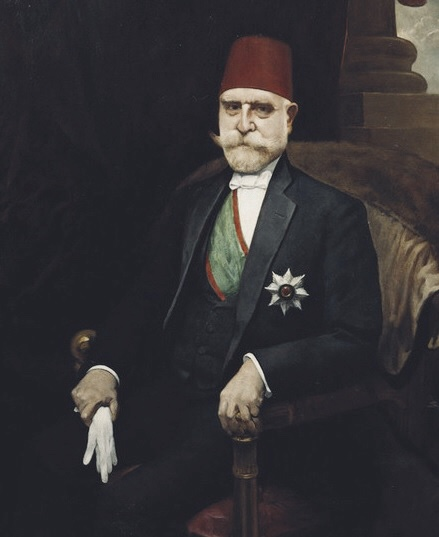

Grand Vizier of the Ottoman Empire
- In office 3 October 1852 – 14 May 1853
- Monarch: Abdulmejid I
- Preceded by: Mehmed Emin Âli Pasha
- Succeeded by: Mustafa Naili Pasha

Personal details
- Born: 1813 Hemşin, Ottoman Empire (modern-day Turkey)
- Died: 1868 (aged 54–55) Istanbul, Ottoman Empire (modern-day Turkey)
- Spouse(s): Saliha Hanım; Adile Sultan; Nevkevser Hanım

Damat Mehmed Ali Pasha (1813–1868) was an Ottoman statesman and diplomat. He served as the Grand Vizier from October 3, 1852, to May 14, 1853, on the eve of the Crimean War. Along with Fuad Pasha, Mehmed Emin Âli Pasha and Mustafa Reşid Pasha, he was one of the main reformers of the Tanzimat period. He was also the last Kapudan Pasha of the Ottoman Empire (a position akin to Grand Admiral/Admiral of the Fleet, but with broader governmental powers) before the office was abolished in 1867.

== Early life and career ==
Mehmed Ali Pasha was born in 1813 in Hemşin, a city along the Black Sea coast in modern Turkey, and was of ethnic Hemshin descent. His father was Hacı Ömer Agha. His grandfather, Hacı Ali Agha, was a hazelnut dealer. It was while accompanying his father to Istanbul that Mehmed Ali Pasha opened to himself the doors of a brilliant career. His father was appointed Galata Başağası, or head functionary of the imperial palace of Galata. Mehmed Ali was hired by Ahmed Pasha Pabuççuzâde, grand admiral of the Ottoman fleet from 1828 to 1840. Mehmed Ali made his career in the Palace, which led him to occupy, among others, the function of grand admiral five times between 1845-1847, 1848–1849, 1851-1852, 1855–1858, and 1858–1863. Between 1849–1851, and 1853–1854, he served as serasker. In 1852-1853, he served as grand vizier.

== Personal life ==
Mehmed Ali Pasha had a brother Mehmed Bey, and a sister Fatma Hanım, who married Mehmed Cemil Pasha, son of grand vizier Mustafa Reşid Pasha.

His first wife was Saliha Hanım. With her, he had a son Mahmud Edhem Pasha. On 23 April 1857, Edhem married Refia Sultan, daughter of Sultan Abdulmejid I and Gülcemal Kadın. After her death in 1880, he married Fatma Nazlı Hanım. With her, he had a son, Mehmed Ali Bey, who died on 6 October 1887. Edhem died on 7 February 1886.

His second wife was Adile Sultan, daughter of Sultan Mahmud II and Zernigâr Hanım. They married on 23 April 1845. The two together had four children, Hayriye Hanımsultan, Sultanzade Isma'il Bey, Sıdıka Hanımsultan, and Aliye Hanımsultan. His third wife was Nevkevser Hanım. With her he had a daughter, Hatice Hanım, who married Cemal Bey.

== See also ==
- List of Ottoman grand viziers

Political offices
Preceded by Mehmed Emin Âli Pasha	Grand Vizier of the Ottoman Empire; 1852–1853	Succeeded by Mustafa Naili Pasha
