= Feride Hanımsultan =

Ottoman princess, daughter of Ahmed Fethi Pasha and Atiye Sultan

- Born: 30 May 1847; Constantinople, Ottoman Empire (now Istanbul, Turkey)
- Died: December 1920 (aged 73); Constantinople, Ottoman Empire
- Burial: Yahya Efendi Cemetery, Istanbul
- Spouse: Mahmud Nedim Pasha (m. 1868; died 1904)
- Issue: Mehmed Saib Bey
Names
- Turkish: Feride Hanımsultan; Ottoman Turkish: فریدہ خانم سلطان
- Father: Ahmed Fethi Pasha
- Mother: Atiye Sultan
- Religion: Sunni Islam

Feride Hanımsultan (Ottoman Turkish: فریدہ خانم سلطان; 30 May 1847 – December 1920) was an Ottoman princess, the daughter of Atiye Sultan and Ahmed Fethi Pasha, and a granddaughter of the Ottoman Sultan Mahmud II.

== Biography ==
Feride Hanımsultan was born on 30 May 1847. Her father was Ahmed Fethi Pasha, son of Rodoslu Hafız Ahmed Agha and Saliha Hanım, and her mother was Atiye Sultan, daughter of Sultan Mahmud II and Pervizifelek Kadın. She had a full sister, Seniye Hanımsultan, three years elder than her. She also had five paternal half-siblings, brothers Mehmed Besim Bey and Damat Mahmud Celaleddin Pasha, who married Cemile Sultan, daughter of Sultan Abdulmejid I, and sisters, Ferdane Hanım, Saliha Yeğane Hanım and Emine Güzide Hanım.

After their mother's death in 1850, Feride and Seniye came into possession of their mother's palace in Emirgan, while Atiye's palace in Arnavutköy was allocated for the guests, who visited the empire. Later, their palace in Emirgan was given to the governor of Egypt, and the two sisters were allocated the villa of Rıza Pasha. Later still, the two came into possession of the palace in Arnavutköy.

In 1868, she married Mahmud Nedim Pasha. The two together had a son, Mehmed Saib Bey, born on 1869, who died on 26 November 1871. She was widowed upon his death in 1904. In 1912, the "Hilal-i Ahmer Centre for Women" was organized within the "Ottoman Hilal-i Ahmer Association", a foundation established in 1877 to provide medical care in Istanbul and surrounding communities. As a member of the foundation, Feride was obliged to give the foundation 1500 kuruş every year.

Feride died in December 1920, and was buried in Yahya Efendi Cemetery, Istanbul.

== Honour ==
- Order of the House of Osman

== Issue ==
Name	Birth	Death	Notes
Mehmed Saib Bey	c. 1869	26 November 1871	Died young, and buried in Eyüp

== Ancestry ==
Ancestors of Feride Hanımsultan

8. Hasan Agha
4. Rodoslu Hafız Ahmed Agha
2. Ahmed Fethi Pasha
7. Saliha Hanım
1. Feride Hanımsultan
12. Abdul Hamid I
6. Mahmud II
13. Nakşidil Sultan
3. Atiye Sultan
7. Pervizifelek Kadın
