= Seniye Hanımsultan =

Ottoman princess, daughter of Ahmed Fethi Pasha and Atiye Sultan

- Born: 3 October 1843; Constantinople, Ottoman Empire
- Died: 10 December 1913 (aged 70); Constantinople, Ottoman Empire
- Burial: Yahya Efendi Cemetery, Istanbul
- Spouse: Hüseyin Hüsnü Pasha (m. 1860; died 1899)
- Issue: Abdülkemir Pasha
Names
- Turkish: Seniye Hanımsultan; Ottoman Turkish: سنیه خانم سلطان
- Father: Ahmed Fethi Pasha
- Mother: Atiye Sultan
- Religion: Sunni Islam

Seniye Hanımsultan (Ottoman Turkish: سنیه خانم سلطان; 3 October 1843 – 10 December 1913) was an Ottoman princess, the daughter of Atiye Sultan and Ahmed Fethi Paşa, and granddaughter of the Ottoman Sultan Mahmud II.

== Biography ==
Seniye Hanımsultan was born on 3 October 1843. Her father was Ahmed Fethi Pasha, son of Rodoslu Hafız Ahmed Agha and Saliha Hanım, and her mother was Atiye Sultan, daughter of Sultan Mahmud II and Pervizfelek Kadın. She had a full sister, Feride Hanımsultan, three years younger than her. She also had five paternal half-siblings, brothers Mehmed Besim Bey and Damat Mahmud Celaleddin Pasha, who married Cemile Sultan, daughter of Sultan Abdulmejid I, and sisters, Ferdane Hanım, Saliha Yeğane Hanım and Emine Güzide Hanım.

After their mother's death in 1850, Seniye and Feride came into possession of their mother's palace in Emirgan, while Atiye's palace in Arnavutköy was allocated for the guests, who visited the empire. Later their palace in Emirgan was given to the governor of Egypt, and the two sisters were allocated the villa of Rıza Pasha. Later the two came into possession of the palace in Arnavutköy.

In 1860, she married Hüseyin Hüsnü Pasha, son of Mustafa Nuri Pasha in the Eyüp Palace. They had a son. She was widowed at his death in 1899. In 1912, the "Hilal-i Ahmer Centre for Women" was organized within the "Ottoman Hilal-i Ahmer Association", a foundation established in 1877 to provide medical care in Istanbul and surrounding communities. As a member of the foundation, Seniye was obliged to give the foundation 1500 kuruş every year.

Seniye died on 10 December 1913, and was buried in Yahya Efendi Cemetery, Istanbul.

== Issue ==
By her marriage, Seniye Hanımsultan had a son:

- Abdülkemir Pasha. He had two daughters, Fahire Hanim and Radiye Hanim.

== Honour ==
- Order of the House of Osman

== Ancestry ==
Ancestors of Seniye Hanımsultan

8. Hasan Agha
4. Rodoslu Hafız Ahmed Agha
2. Ahmed Fethi Pasha1
Saliha Hanım
1. Seniye Hanımsultan
12. Abdul Hamid I
6. Mahmud II
13. Nakşidil Sultan
3. Atiye Sultan
7. Pervizifelek Kadın
