= Ahmed Fethi Pasha =

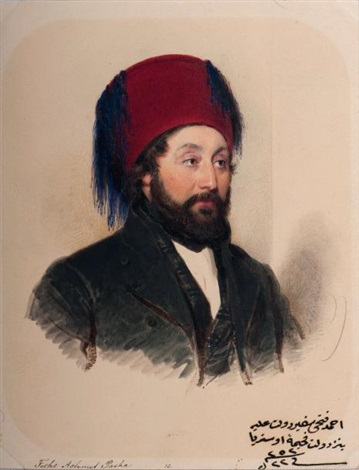

Ambassador to Russia
- In office 1833–1834

Ambassador to Austria
- In office 1834–1836

Ambassador to France
- In office 1837–1839

Personal details
- Born: Ahmed Fethi c. 1801 Sanjak of Rhodes, Eyalet of the Archipelago, Ottoman Empire
- Died: c. 1858 (aged 56–57) Istanbul, Ottoman Empire (present day Istanbul, Turkey)
- Spouse(s): Ayşe Şemsinur Hanım Atiye Sultan (m. 1840; died 1850)
- Occupation: Field marshal, ambassador and industrialist

Ahmed Fethi Pasha (born 1801 in Rhodes – died 1858 in Istanbul) was an Ottoman marshal, ambassador and industrialist, who belonged to the Cretan Muslim community.

== Career ==
Prior to becoming a Marshal, Ahmed served as ambassador to Russia in 1833, Austria in 1834-1836 and France in 1837-1839. His last diplomatic assignment was as the representative of the Ottoman Empire at Queen Victoria's coronation. In 1839, Ahmed returned to Constantinople for Sultan Abdulmejid I's coronation and to marry Abdulmecid's sister Atiye Sultan.

As an industrialist he was intent on bringing the Ottoman Empire into the modern age. Ahmed started steel factories and the famous Beykoz porcelain factory, which carried the insignia Product of Istanbul (Eser-i Istanbul).

In 1846, Ahmed, now marshal of the Imperial arsenal, turned the Hagia Irene into a military antiques museum. It is possible Ahmed gained his inspiration for the conversion of the Hagia Irene into a museum, from touring European museums during his career as an ambassador. Through his work, he created the first Ottoman museum.

== Personal life ==
Ahmed Fethi Pasha was the son of Rodoslu Hafız Ahmed Agha and Saliha Hanım. He was the grandson of Hasan Agha and the great-grandson of Ramazan Agha. After his father's death, his mother married Hacı Bey, the Sanjak Bey of Artvin.

His first wife was Ayşe Şemsinur Hanım (died 4 July 1881). She had been a slave girl, who was brought to Istanbul at a young age during the Chios Massacre in 1822, and was brought up by his mother. With her, he had two sons, Mehmed Besim Pasha (died 1850) and Damat Mahmud Celaleddin Pasha (1834 – 1884), and three daughters Ferdane Hanım, Saliha Yeğane Hanım (died 1922) and Emine Güzide Hanım (1848 – 1909). From his second wife, Atiye Sultan, he had two daughters, Seniye Hanımsultan (4 October 1843 – 1913) and Feride Hanımsultan (30 April 1847 – 1920). His marriage to Atiye Sultan, daughter of Mahmud II, made Fethi Pasha a damat, a courtesy title for men who married into the Ottoman imperial family.

Mahmud Celaleddin Pasha married Cemile Sultan, daughter of Sultan Abdulmejid I and Düzdidil Hanım. The two together had six children, three sons, Sultanzade Besim Bey, Sultanzade Mehmed Celaleddin Bey, Sultanzade Mehmed Sakıb Bey, and three daughters, Fethiye Hanımsultan, Ayşe Sıdıka Hanımsultan, and Fatma Hanımsultan.

Saliha Yeğane married Bekir Bey and had three children, two sons, Hasan Bey and Alaaddin Bey and one daughter, Ferdane Hanım. Emine Güzide married Mehmed Said Pasha, and had five children, two sons, Memduh Bey and Mehmed Said Bey, and three daughters, Ayşegül Mediha Hanım, Fatma Saide Hanım, and Saliha Yeğane Hanım.
