= Rahime Perestu Sultan =

Wife of Sultan Abdulmecid I

- Valide Sultan
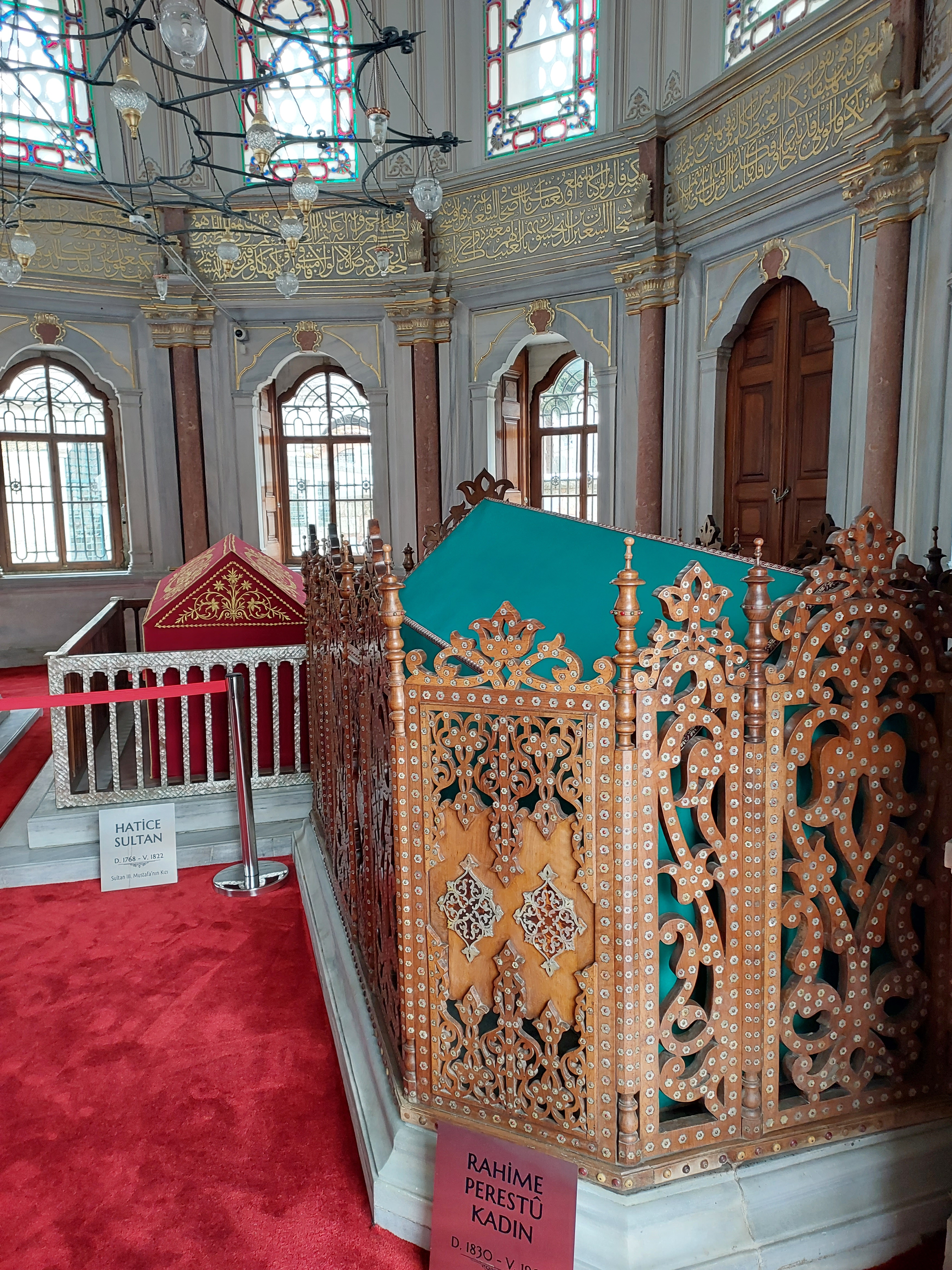
- Tomb of Rahîme Perestû Sultan in Mihrişah Sultan Mausoleum, Eyüp, Istanbul

Valide Sultan of the Ottoman Empire
- Tenure: 31 August 1876 – 11 December 1904
- Predecessor: Şevkefza Sultan
- Successor: Title abolished
- Born: Rahime Hanim c. 1830; Circassia, North Caucasus, Russian Empire
- Died: c. 11 December 1904 (aged 73–74); Maçka Palace, Maçka, Constantinople, Ottoman Empire
- Burial: Mihrişah Sultan Complex, Eyüp, Constantinople
- Spouse: Abdulmejid I (m. 1844; died 1861)
- Issue: Adopted; Cemile Sultan; Abdülhamid II
Names
- Turkish: Rahime Perestu Sultan; Ottoman Turkish: رحیمه پرستو سلطان
- Mother: Esma Sultan (adoptive)
- Religion: Sunni Islam

Rahime Perestu Sultan (Ottoman Turkish: رحیمه پرستو سلطان; c. 1830 – 11 December 1904), also known as Rahime Perestu Kadın, was the first legal wife of Sultan Abdulmejid I of the Ottoman Empire. She was given the title and position of valide sultan (empress mother) when Abdul Hamid II, her adopted son, ascended the throne in 1876, making her the last valide sultan of the Ottoman Empire.

== Early life ==
Of Circassian origin, Perestu was born circa 1830 to an Ubykh noble family, with the name Rahime Kadın. She had one sister, Mihrifidan Hanım (died 1865), who was the wife of Fazıl Bey, son of Yusuf Pasha.

Esma Sultan, the daughter of Sultan Abdul Hamid I, lived in luxury in her Istanbul villa, but she spent a lot of her life in sadness due to her inability to conceive a child. As a result, she adopted a one year old child (Rahime), having reached satisfactory terms with the mother and father. As Esma's daughter, she had an adoptive sister, Nazif Hanım, adopted by Esma too.

Rahime was said to be diminutive, delicate and graceful, so Esma renamed her Perestu, the Persian word for swallow. The Kalfas in Esma Sultan's villa behaved toward this child as though she were a daughter of an Ottoman Imperial Princess, and by way of her disposition and manners, they became devoted to her. Perestu was described as a beautiful woman, possessing a petite and slender figure with 'translucent white skin, blue eyes, golden blonde hair, and truly lovely hands and feet'. Sources also claim she had elegant and refined manners, was kindly, dignified and always spoke in a low voice, gaining affection and respect.

== Marriage ==
One spring day in 1844, Abdulmejid came to visit his aunt and was passing through the harem gardens when he saw Perestu, then fourteen years old. The chronicles say that he was so impressed with her that her aunt asked him if he was okay.

He asked his aunt to give her hand in marriage to him. Firstly, Esma Sultan refused to give Perestu's hand in marriage but later consented, provided that Perestu became his legal wife and not a consort in concubinage. One week after that, Perestu was sent off to the Topkapı Palace and became Abdulmejid's first legal wife.

She was given the title of "Senior Ikbal". In 1845, she was elevated to "Sixth Kadın", in 1851, to "Fifth Kadın", and in 1861, to "Fourth Kadın".

Perestu had no children of her own. In 1845, when Cemile Sultan's mother Düzdidil Hanım died leaving her motherless aged two, Abdulmejid entrusted her to Perestu's care. She also became the adoptive mother of Abdul Hamid II after the death of his own mother, Tirimüjgan Kadın in 1852. Thus, the two siblings grew up together in the same household and spent their childhoods with one another.

After Abdulmejid's death in 1861, she settled in her villa in Maçka, Nişantaşı, which had been gifted to her by Sultan Abdulaziz.

== Children ==
Perestu had no biological children, but she adopted two of Abdulmejid's children, a daughter and a son, who were born to other consorts, when they lost their mothers:

- Cemile Sultan (17 August 1843 – 26 February 1915). Her natural mother was Düzdidil Hanım, dead in 1845. She married once and had three sons and three daughters.
- Abdul Hamid II (21 September 1842 – 10 February 1918). His natural mother was Tirimüjgan Kadın, dead in 1852. 34th Sultan of the Ottoman Empire.

== As Valide Sultan ==
After Abdul Hamid II ascended the throne in 1876, she was given the position of Valide Sultan, title due to the mother of the Sultan, by him, and headed the harem. Perestu was the first woman to have this title without being the Sultan's biological mother, and the last woman in history to bear it, since both Mehmed V and Mehmed VI, the last two Ottoman Sultans, were orphans on their ascent to the throne. Abdul Hamid told her categorically not to involve herself in politics. Thus, unlike many of her predecessors, she was not active in politics, because, although he valued his adoptive mother, he believed that the excessive interference of the previous Valide Sultans in politics had damaged the Empire.

In 1879 she interceded with Abdul Hamid on behalf of his half-sister Mediha Sultan and her adoptive mother Verdicenan Kadın. Mediha Sultan wanted to marry the man she was in love with instead of accepting an arranged marriage, and she sought the help of the Valide Sultan in presenting her request to the Sultan. Abdul Hamid accepted the request.

Three days before Abdul Hamid became Sultan, he went to Perestu's villa and kissed her hand, acknowledging her as his Valide Sultan, and it was from there that he proceeded to Topkapı Palace for the ceremony of homage at his accession. Perestu loved this house. Now and again she would want to go there, but because Abdul Hamid absolutely wanted her present in the palace he would withhold permission.

In 1885, during the visit of King Oscar II and Queen Sophia of Sweden and Norway to the Ottoman Empire, she received the Swedish and Norwegian Queen, who was allowed to visit the Imperial harem.

The internal matters of the palace were in her charge. But she did not want to hurt anyone's feelings in the least, did not interfere in the matters, sought justice and equity, and because she was firmly religious she passed a good deal of time in prayers. She possessed good, high moral standards, which led her to help the poor and needy.

Abdul Hamid particularly wanted Perestu to attend the Royal Mosque Procession every Friday. Sometimes after the ceremony she would secretly slip out to her villa, but when Abdul Hamid learned of it, he immediately aided set off from the palace with a carriage and brought her back.

In 1891, Perestu commissioned a fountain (sebil) in Bala Tekkesi, Silivrikapı and another fountain (çeşme) in the same place in 1895.

== Death ==
Perestu died on 11 December 1904 in her mid 70s in her villa located at Maçka, Istanbul. The traditional service at which the Prophet's Nativity Poem is recited was held in her memory at the Shaziliya Dervish Convent and at the Yıldız Hamidiye Mosque.

She lies at rest in the complex of Mihrişah Sultan in Eyüp, Istanbul.

== Honours ==
- Order of the House of Osman
- Order of Charity
- Order of the Medjidie

== In literature and popular culture ==
- Rahime Perestu Sultan is a character in Hıfzı Topuz's historical novel Abdülmecit: İmparatorluk Çökerken Sarayda 22 Yıl: Roman (2009).
- Rahime Perestu Sultan is a character in Tim Symonds' historical novel Sherlock Holmes and The Sword of Osman (2015).
- In the 2017 TV series Payitaht: Abdülhamid, Rahime Perestu Sultan is portrayed by Turkish actress Şefika Ümit Tolun.

== See also ==
- Kadın (title)
- Valide sultan
- List of consorts of the Ottoman sultans
- Ottoman Imperial Harem

== Sources ==
- Brookes, Douglas Scott (2010). The Concubine, the Princess, and the Teacher: Voices from the Ottoman Harem. University of Texas Press. ISBN 978-0-292-78335-5.
- Sakaoğlu, Necdet (2008). Bu mülkün kadın sultanları: Vâlide sultanlar, hâtunlar, hasekiler, kadınefendiler, sultanefendiler. Oğlak Yayıncılık. ISBN 978-9-753-29623-6.
- Uluçay, Mustafa Çağatay (2011). Padişahların kadınları ve kızları. Ankara: Ötüken. ISBN 978-9-754-37840-5.

Ottoman royalty
Preceded by Şevkefza Kadın	Valide Sultan; 31 August 1876 – 1904	Vacant until sultanate abolished in 1922
