= Atiye Sultan =

Daughter of Ottoman Sultan Mahmud II

- Born: 2 January 1824; Topkapı Palace, Constantinople, Ottoman Empire
- Died: 11 August 1850 (aged 26); Constantinople, Ottoman Empire
- Burial: Sultan Mahmud II Mausoleum, Istanbul
- Spouse: Ahmed Fethi Pasha (m. 1840; died 1850)
- Issue: Seniye Hanımsultan; Feride Hanımsultan
- Dynasty: Ottoman
- Father: Mahmud II
- Mother: Pervizfelek Kadın
- Religion: Sunni Islam

Atiye Sultan (Ottoman Turkish: عطیه سلطان; 2 January 1824 – 11 August 1850) was an Ottoman princess, the daughter of Sultan Mahmud II and Pervizifelek Kadın. She was the half-sister of Sultans Abdulmejid I and Abdulaziz.

== Early life ==
Atiye Sultan was born on 2 January 1824 in the Topkapı Palace. Her father was Sultan Mahmud II, son of Sultan Abdul Hamid I and Nakşidil Sultan, and her mother was Pervizfelek Kadın. She had two full sisters, Hatice Sultan, one year younger than her, and Fatma Sultan, four years younger than her, both of whom died young.

She was described as a smart and talented girl, interested in poetry and literature. She was the half-sister closest to Abdulmejid I, who was only ten months older than her. Often, when they were young, she followed him out of the palace dressed as a boy.

== Marriage ==
On 8 January 1840, during the reign of her elder half-brother Abdulmejid I, Atiye was betrothed to Rodosizade Ahmed Fethi Pasha. The marriage took place on 25 June 1840, and was performed by Shaykh al-Islām Mekkizade Mustafa Asım Efendi with a dowry of 1001 silver purses. The wedding took place on 7 August 1840 in the Dolmabahçe Palace and lasted for seven days. Atiye was sixteen and Ahmed Fethi was thirty nine years old at the time. This was the second marriage for the groom, who already had two children, Mehmed Besim Bey and Mahmud Celaeddin Pasha, who married Cemile Sultan, daughter of Abdulmejid I; and three daughters, Ferdane Hanım, Saliha Yeğane Hanım and Emine Güzide Hanım.

The couple were given the Arnavutköy Palace as their residence. After that, she lived in the Kuruçeşme Palace, Esma Sultan Palace and Eyüphan Villa located in Kağıthane, between Eyüp and Defterdar. After the marriage, the pasha moved to Atiye's palace. When she later learned that he was married, she displayed great jealousy and insisted that he not leave the palace. Even on the evenings when he didn't return to the palace because of his affairs, she would send men to his previous mansion in Kuzguncuk to check if he was there.

The two together had two daughters, Seniye Hanımsultan, born on 4 October 1843, and Feride Hanımsultan, born on 30 April 1847. Charles White, who visited Istanbul in 1843, said the following about her:

Atya is a patroness of literature, and not without talent as a poetess.

== Death ==
Atiye Sultan died on 11 August 1850 at the age of twenty-six, and was buried in the mausoleum of her father located in Divanyolu, Istanbul.

== Issue ==
Name	Birth	Death	Notes
Seniye Hanımsultan	3 October 1843	10 December 1913	married in 1860 in the Eyüp Palace to Hüseyin Hüsnü Pasha, she had a son, Abdülkerim Pasha, who had two daughters, Fahire Hanım and Radiye Hanım; buried in Yahya Efendi Cemetery;
Feride Hanımsultan	30 May 1847	December 1920	married in 1868 to Mahmud Nedim Pasha, and had a son; buried in Yahya Efendi Cemetery;

== See also ==
- List of Ottoman princesses

== Sources ==
- Sakaoğlu, Necdet (2008). Bu mülkün kadın sultanları: Vâlide sultanlar, hâtunlar, hasekiler, kadınefendiler, sultanefendiler. Oğlak Yayıncılık. ISBN 978-9-753-29623-6.
- Uluçay, Mustafa Çağatay (2011). Padişahların kadınları ve kızları. Ankara: Ötüken. ISBN 978-9-754-37840-5.
