= Düzdidil Hanım =

Consort of Ottoman Sultan Abdulmejid I (c.1825–1845)

- Born: c. 1825
- Died: 18 August 1845 (aged 19–20); Constantinople, Ottoman Empire (present day Istanbul, Turkey)
- Burial: Imperial ladies Mausoleum, New Mosque, Istanbul
- Spouse: Abdulmejid I (m. 1840)
- Issue: Neyire Sultan; Münire Sultan; Cemile Sultan; Samiye Sultan
Names
- Turkish: Düzdidil Hanım; Ottoman Turkish: دزددل قادین
- House: Ottoman (by marriage)
- Religion: Sunni Islam

Düzdidil Hanim (Ottoman Turkish: دزددل قادین, from Persian دزد دل duzd-i dil meaning "thief of hearts"; c. 1825 – 18 August 1845) was a consort of Sultan Abdulmejid I of the Ottoman Empire.

== Life ==
Düzdidil Hanım was born circa 1825. She was of half Abkhaz and half Circassian Ubykh descent. She was presented to Abdulmejid by his mother, Bezmiâlem Sultan. She grew up at the court under the supervision of the chief treasurer of the harem. Abdulmejid one day noticed her while she played the piano and decided to marry her. They married in 1840, and Düzdidil was given the title of "Senior Ikbal" (BaşIkbal).

On 13 October 1841, she gave birth to twins daughters, Neyire Sultan and Münire Sultan in the Old Beşiktaş Palace. The princesses died one as newborn and the other at age of two.

On 17 August 1843, she gave birth to her third child, a daughter, Cemile Sultan in the Old Beylerbeyi Palace. On 23 February 1845, she gave birth to her fourth child, a daughter, Samiye Sultan in the Topkapı Palace. The princess died two months later on 15 April 1845.

Charles White, who visited Istanbul in 1843, wrote the following about her:

The third...is cited as remarkable for her beauty, and not less so for her haughty and wayward disposition.

== Death ==
The prayer book of Düzdidil that was designed when she fell in the epidemic of tuberculosis.

Düzdidil had fallen victim to the epidemic of tuberculosis then raging in Istanbul. A luxuriously decorated prayer book was commissioned around 1844 for her. As was fitting for her position, the prayer book was lavishly ornate. Düzdidil was separated from her alive daughter and isolated, entrusted to the care of her maternal cousin Cican Hanim.

She died on 18 August 1845, and was buried in the mausoleum of the imperial ladies at the New Mosque Istanbul. Cemile Sultan was only two years old when Düzdidil died. She was adopted by another of Sultan Abdulmejid's wives, Perestu Kadın, who was also the adoptive mother one of her half-brothers, the future Sultan Abdul Hamid II.

== Issue ==
Name	Birth	Death	Notes
Neyire Sultan	13 October 1841	14 January 1844	Twin sister of Münire, born in Beşiktaş Palace; buried in Nuruosmaniye Mosque
Münire Sultan	13 October 1841	18 December 1841	Twin sister of Neyire, born in Beşiktaş Palace; buried in Nuruosmaniye Mosque
Cemile Sultan	17 August 1843	26 February 1915	married once, and had issue, three sons and three daughters
Samiye Sultan	23 February 1845	15 April 1845	born in Topkapı Palace; died in Çırağan Palace, and buried in New Mosque

== In literature ==
- Düzdidil is a character in Hıfzı Topuz's historical novel Abdülmecit: İmparatorluk Çökerken Sarayda 22 Yıl: Roman (2009).

== See also ==
- Kadın (title)
- Ottoman Imperial Harem
- List of consorts of the Ottoman sultans

== Sources ==
- Uluçay, M. Çağatay (2011). Padişahların kadınları ve kızları. Ötüken. ISBN 978-9-754-37840-5.
- Sakaoğlu, Necdet (2008). Bu Mülkün Kadın Sultanları: Vâlide Sultanlar, Hâtunlar, Hasekiler, Kadınefendiler, Sultanefendiler. Oğlak Yayıncılık. ISBN 978-6-051-71079-2.
- Brookes, Douglas Scott (2010). The Concubine, the Princess, and the Teacher: Voices from the Ottoman Harem. University of Texas Press. ISBN 978-0-292-78335-5.
- Paşa, Ahmed Cevdet (1960). Tezâkir. [2]. 13 - 20, Volume 2. Türk Tarih Kurumu Basımevi.
