= Cemile Sultan =

Ottoman princess, daughter of Sultan Abdulmejid I (1843–1915)

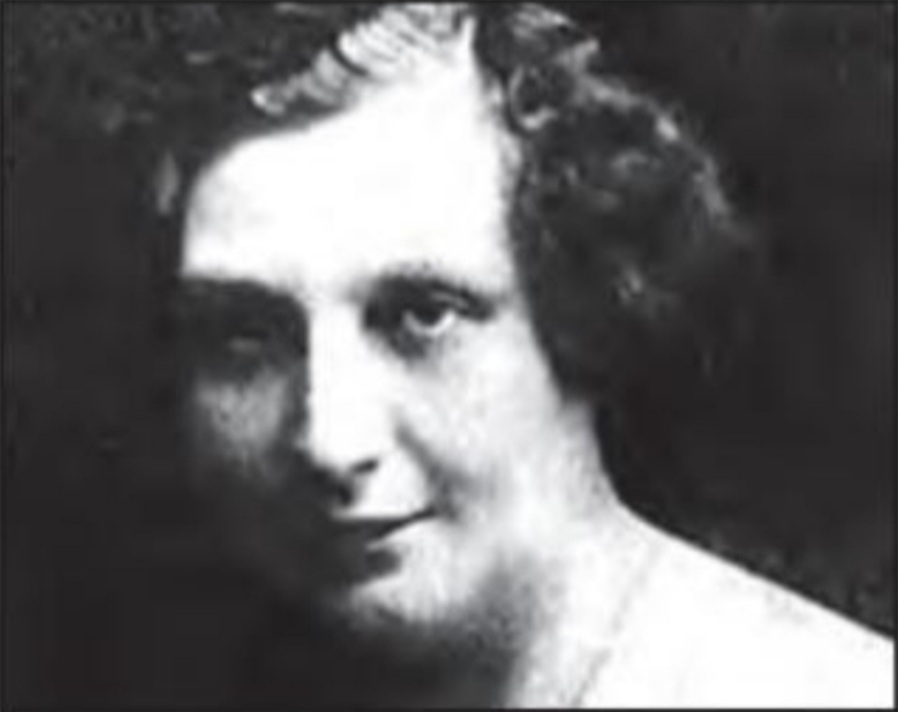
- Born: 17 August 1843; Old Beylerbeyi Palace, Constantinople, Ottoman Empire
- Died: 26 February 1915 (aged 71); Erenköy Palace, Constantinople, Ottoman Empire
- Burial: Yavuz Selim Mosque, Istanbul
- Spouse: Mahmud Celaleddin Pasha (m. 1858; died 1884)
- Issue: Fethiye Hanımsultan; Sultanzade Besim Bey; Sultanzade Mehmed Mahmud Celaleddin Bey; Sultanzade Mehmed Sakıb Bey; Ayşe Sıdıka Hanımsultan; Fatma Hanımsultan
- Dynasty: Ottoman
- Father: Abdulmejid I
- Mother: Biological; Düzdidil Hanım; Adoptive; Rahime Perestu Sultan
- Religion: Sunni Islam

Cemile Sultan (Ottoman Turkish: جمیله سلطان; 17 August 1843 – 26 February 1915) was an Ottoman princess, the daughter of Sultan Abdulmejid I and Düzdidil Hanım. She was the half sister of Sultans Murad V, Abdul Hamid II, Mehmed V, and Mehmed VI.

== Early life ==
Cemile Sultan was born on 17 August 1843 in the Old Beylerbeyi Palace. Her father was Sultan Abdulmejid I, and her mother was Düzdidil Hanım. She was the third child and the third daughter of her mother. She had two elder sisters, twin Neyire Sultan and Münire Sultan, two years older than her, and a younger sister, Samiye Sultan, who all died young.

In 1845, Düzdidil Hanım died, leaving Cemile Sultan motherless at the age of two. Abdulmejid entrusted her to the care of his first legal wife, Perestu Kadın. She grew up together with her half-brother Abdul Hamid II, who was also adopted by Perestu, in the same household and spent their childhood with one another. The two siblings were very close, and Cemile was influential in the first years of Abdülhamid II's reign.

Abdülmecid wanted all his sons and daughters to have a high level of education, which included both traditional subjects, including Koranic studies, and Western ones. Cemile's education began in 1847. She attended the lessons with her half-brother Şehzade Mehmed Reşad and Murad V, her adoptive brother Abdülhamid, and her half-sisters Fatma Sultan and Refia Sultan. Her education continued even after marriage. She learned Arabic, Persian, and also French, which became prominent during the Tanzimat era. She also learned French and Western music. She acquired her piano lessons from an Italian lady, Therese Romano.

She was her father's favorite daughter, who praised her continuously.

== Marriage ==
In 1854, at the age of eleven, Abdulmejid betrothed her to Mahmud Celaleddin Pasha, son of Damat Ahmed Fethi Pasha, and his first wife, Ayşe Şemsinur Hanım. Fethi Pasha had himself been married to Cemile's aunt, Atiye Sultan. The wedding took place on 17 May 1858 and was consummated on 11 June 1858. The couple was given a palace at Findiklı as their residence.

The wedding of her half-sister Münire Sultan was also celebrated on the same day. The cost of the ceremony was bitterly criticized, because the Ottoman army had just suffered heavy defeats in Montenegro, and Crete was in revolt. At her marriage, her mother-in-law presented Mediha Nazikeda Kadın, who would later become the first consort of Sultan Abdul Hamid II, Cemile's adoptive brother. Among her ladies in attendance was Aliye Nazikeda Hanim, who became the third wife of Şehzade Yusuf Izzeddin, eldest son of Abdülaziz. Furthermore, Cemile Sultan took into service Emine Nazikeda Hanım, future consort of Mehmed VI, together with her sisters Daryal and Naciye Hanım and her cousins Amine, Rumeysa, Pakize, Fatma and Kamile Hanim. The future Mehmed VI asked Cemile for permission to marry Nazikeda in 1884, but she initially refused, finally agreeing after a year of prodding, when Mehmed swore that, if he could not marry Nazikeda he would never marry, and that, if she became his wife, he would take no other consorts.

The two together had six children, three sons, Sultanzade Besim Bey and twins Sultanzade Mehmed Mahmud Celaleddin Bey and Sultanzade Mehmed Sakıb Bey, and three daughters, Fethiye Hanımsultan, Ayşe Sıdıka Hanımsultan and Fatma Hanımsultan.

The couple supported Abdul Hamid's accession to the throne in 1876. In 1877, the two of them used every incident to stir the sultan against the then grand vizier Midhat Pasha, in particular his attachment to the Young Ottomans, attributing all their statements to his influence. Finally, holding Midhat responsible for the failure of the conference, Abdul Hamid decided to send him on an extended trip to Europe. Midhat was removed from the office of grand vizierate and was replaced by Ibrahim Edhem Pasha. Abdul Hamid's mistrust of Mahmud Celaleddin Pasha led to the latter's exile to Arabia in 1881, where he was strangled in 1884. Princess Cemile withdrew from society for some twenty years, afterward reconciling with her brother and paying calls again at the palace.

== Death ==
Cemile Sultan died at Erenköy, Istanbul, on 26 February 1915 at the age of seventy-one, and was buried in the mausoleum of her father, Sultan Abdulmejid.

As of 2005, at least fourteen of her descendants from her three marriages that produced children were still living.

== Personality ==
On ceremonial occasions, Cemile Sultan took precedence as she was the eldest, and always took her place at Abdul Hamid's right where a large armchair was reserved for her. In processions, she walked at the side of Perestu Kadın, ahead of everyone else.

She always wore brown-colored dresses and on her head a hotoz of the same color, fashioned of lace or tulle. She dressed in the Turkish style, with a long train fastened to her waist. Since the sumptuous fabrics she wore were always various shades of brown, this color served as something of a hallmark for her. She wore no jewels whatsoever. Despite this simplicity, her imperial bearing amply conveyed her rank of princess.

Those in a position to know said that, "She looked just like her father. Everyone in the palace felt great respect and fondness for Princess Cemile, holding her in affectionate esteem. She spoke so graciously and intelligently, not laughing when it was not called for, and exhibiting toward everyone the appropriate conduct due to them. She was considered the perfect Ottoman princess, and for this, she was Abdülmecid I's favorite daughter."

== Honours ==
Styles of Cemile Sultan
- Reference style: Her Imperial Highness
- Spoken style: Your Imperial Highness

- Order of the House of Osman, Jeweled
- Order of the Medjidie, Jeweled
- Order of Charity, 1st Class
- Hicaz Demiryolu Medal in Gold

== Issue ==
Name	Birth	Death	Notes
Fethiye Hanımsultan	1859	22 March 1887	married in 1887 to Colonel Hayri Bey; died two months into marriage, and buried in Fatih Mosque, Istanbul;
Sultanzade Besim Bey	1860	1862	died at the age of two, and buried in Üsküdar;
Sultanzade Mehmed Mahmud Celaleddin Bey	December 1864	1916	twin brother of Sakıb, married firstly to Visalinur Hanım, a Circassian, and had one son Ziyaeddin Bey and one daughter Mevhibe Hanım, married secondly to Hayriye Hanım (died 1934), and had one daughter Münire Hanım;
Sultanzade Mehmed Sakıb Bey	December 1864	1897	twin brother of Mahmud Celaleddin, married firstly to Vicdan Hanım (died 1938) and had one daughter Şehime Hanım (died 1914–1915), married secondly to Dilbeşte Hanım and had one daughter Emine Hanım (died September 1926);
Ayşe Şadıka Hanımsultan	20 September 1875	1938	married firstly on 29 January 1891 with a dowry of 250,001 kuruş to Hacı Beyefendi, son of Chief of Staff, Ferik Edhem Pasha, married secondly in 1900 to Ali Fuad Ürfi Pasha, son of Ottoman ambassador to Austria, Ali Pasha, and had two daughters, Kerime Hanım and Naime Hanım. Her husband's paternal grandfather was Gürcü Halil Rifat Pasha, husband of Saliha Sultan and father-in-law of Seniha Sultan, respectively aunt and half-sister of Ayşe Şadıka's mother. Died in exile in Nice, France, buried in Bobigny cemetery
Fatma Hanımsultan	c. 1879	1890	had tuberculosis, and during this time the future Nazikeda Kadın, became her closest companion until she married the then Prince Vahideddin (future Sultan Mehmed VI);

== In popular culture ==
- In the 2017 TV series Payitaht: Abdülhamid, Cemile Sultan is portrayed by Turkish actress Devrim Yakut.

== See also ==
- List of Ottoman princesses

== Sources ==
- Brookes, Douglas Scott (2010). The Concubine, the Princess, and the Teacher: Voices from the Ottoman Harem. University of Texas Press. ISBN 978-0-292-78335-5.
- Kolay, Arif (2017). Osmanlı Saray Hayatından Bir Kesit: Ali Akyıldız ve Mümin ve Müsrif Bir Padişah Kızı Refia Sultan.
- Sakaoğlu, Necdet (2008). Bu mülkün kadın sultanları: Vâlide sultanlar, hâtunlar, hasekiler, kadınefendiler, sultanefendiler. Oğlak Yayıncılık. ISBN 978-9-753-29623-6.
- Uluçay, Mustafa Çağatay (2011). Padişahların kadınları ve kızları. Ankara: Ötüken. ISBN 978-9-754-37840-5.
