= Saliha Sultan (daughter of Mahmud II) =

Ottoman princess, daughter of Mahmud II and Aşubcan Kadın

- Born: 16 June 1811; Topkapı Palace, Constantinople, Ottoman Empire
- Died: 5 February 1843 (aged 31); Fındıklı Palace, Constantinople, Ottoman Empire
- Burial: Sultan Mahmud II Mausoleum, Divanyolu, Istanbul
- Spouse: Damat Gürcü Halil Rifat Pasha (m. 1834)
- Issue: Sultanzade Abdülhamid Bey Efendi; Sultanzade Cavid Bey Efendi; Ayşe Şadıka Hanımsultan
- Dynasty: Ottoman
- Father: Mahmud II
- Mother: Aşubcan Kadın
- Religion: Sunni Islam

Saliha Sultan (Ottoman Turkish: صالحه سلطان; 16 June 1811 – 5 February 1843) was an Ottoman princess, the daughter of Sultan Mahmud II and Aşubcan Kadın. She was the half-sister of Sultans Abdulmejid I and Abdulaziz.

== Early life ==
Saliha Sultan was born on 16 June 1811 in the Topkapı Palace. Her father was Sultan Mahmud II, and her mother was Aşubcan Kadın. In addition to various half-brothers and sisters, she had two full sisters who died in their infance, one older, Ayşe Sultan, and one younger, Şah Sultan. She was a granddaughter of Abdul Hamid I and Nakşidil Sultan.

== Marriage ==
In 1834, when Saliha was twenty three years old, her father arranged her marriage to Damat Gürcü Halil Rifat Pasha. According to Sakaoğlu, she married at an older age than was the norm for princesses due to health problems. The marriage took place on a Saturday, 22 May 1834, in the Beşiktaş Waterfront Palace. The bridal procession of Saliha Sultan left this palace on Thursday, conveying the bride to Fındıklı Palace. The ladies of the marriage procession rode in carriages and coaches decorated with stars.

Julia Pardoe, who observed the marriage from a caique on the Bosphorus noted the illumination of the waterfront palace of Esma Sultan. She writes that, "there must have been many hundred caiques wedged together in front of her terrace, and less than fifty of them contained musicians." The wedding ceremony was covered in the first official Ottoman newspaper Takvim-i Vekayi.

The couple owned the Neşatabad Palace located in Ortaköy Defterdarburnu and the Fındıklı Palace. The marriage wasn't a happy one. However, they had two sons and a daughter.

According to Pardoe, Saliha was a haughty person and had a turbulent relationship with her father Mahmud II. In her memoir of her journey of Istanbul, The Sultan and Domestic Manners of the Turks (1837), she relates two episodes in particular.

In the first, Saliha would be harshly reprimanded by Mahmud II for ordering to beat a group of Ulema who had not bowed as her carriage passed by.

In the second, Pardoe reports that, on the occasion of the wedding of Saliha's half-sister, Mihrimah Sultan, there were no more imperial jewels to give her because Saliha had demanded all of them for her wedding and had never returned them. Besides, she never wore them, because she was too proud to lead a worldly life. Mahmud proposed to sell them, but she replied that no one would dare to buy the jewels of a princess. Mahmud then offered to buy them himself, and Saliha was forced to accept. In reality Mahmud cheated his daughter by paying less than their value. It is not known if Saliha ever learned about that, but in any case she is not known to have complained about it.

== Death ==
Saliha Sultan died on 5 February 1843 at the age of thirty one in the Fındıklı Palace, and was buried in the mausoleum of her grandmother in Nakşidil Sultan, Fatih Mosque, Istanbul.

After her death, Halil married Ismet Hanım. The two together had one son, Asaf Mahmud Celaleddin Pasha, who married Saliha's niece Seniha Sultan, daughter of her half-brother, Sultan Abdulmejid I.

== Issue ==
By her marriage, Saliha Sultan had two sons and a daughter:

- Sultanzade Abdülhamid Bey Efendi (2 March 1835 – March 1837).
- Sultanzade Cavid Bey Efendi (1837 – ?).
- Ayşe Şadıka Hanımsultan (1841 – 1886). She married Server Pasha, son of Said Server Efendi. They had at least three daughters:
  - Ayşe Hanım.
  - Azize Hanım. She married Hariciyeci Suad Bey and had two sons and a daughter:
    - Ziya Songülen.
    - Mahmud Bey.
    - Fehire Hanım. She married Faik Pasha, with issue.
  - Fatma Hanım. She married Fehmi Bey, son of grand vizier Mehmed Esad Saffet Pasha, and had a son a daughter:
    - Halil Bey.
    - Belkis Hanım.

== In popular culture ==
- In 2018 Turkish historical fiction TV series Kalbimin Sultanı, Saliha is portrayed by Turkish actress Aslıhan Malbora.

== See also ==
- List of Ottoman princesses

== Sources ==
- Davis, Fanny (1986). The Ottoman Lady: A Social History from 1718 to 1918. Greenwood Publishing Group. ISBN 978-0-313-24811-5.
- Sakaoğlu, Necdet (2008). Bu mülkün kadın sultanları: Vâlide sultanlar, hâtunlar, hasekiler, kadınefendiler, sultanefendiler. Oğlak Yayıncılık. ISBN 978-9-753-29623-6.
- Uluçay, Mustafa Çağatay (2011). Padişahların kadınları ve kızları. Ankara: Ötüken. ISBN 978-9-754-37840-5.
