= Mihrimah Sultan (daughter of Mahmud II) =

Ottoman princess, daughter of Mahmud II

- Born: 29 June 1812; Topkapı Palace, Constantinople, Ottoman Empire
- Died: 31 August 1838 (aged 26); Constantinople, Ottoman Empire
- Burial: Nakşidil Sultan Mausoleum, Fatih, Istanbul
- Spouse: Mehmed Said Pasha (m. 1836)
- Issue: Sultanzade Mehmed Abdullah Bey
Names
- Turkish: Mihrimah Sultan; Ottoman Turkish: مھرماہ سلطان
- Dynasty: Ottoman
- Father: Mahmud II
- Mother: Hoşyar Kadın
- Religion: Sunni Islam

Mihrimah Sultan (Ottoman Turkish: مهرماہ سلطان; 29 June 1812 – 31 August 1838) was an Ottoman princess, the daughter of Sultan Mahmud II, and his consort Hoşyar Kadın. She was the half-sister of Sultans Abdulmejid I and Abdulaziz.

== Early life ==
Mihrimah Sultan was born on 29 June 1812 in the Topkapı Palace. Her father was Sultan Mahmud II, son of Sultan Abdul Hamid I and Nakşidil Sultan, and her mother was Hoşyar Kadın. She had a younger full sister, Zeynep Sultan, three years younger than her, who died in her infancy.

Before the birth of Mihrimah, Mahmud had two children the same year, Şehzade Bayezid and Şah Sultan. The sultan commemorated the births of his three children together.

== Marriage ==
When the time came to find her a husband, her mother resolved that Mihrimah should be the one to choose who she married. Her mother showed her the portraits of several young men, and she fixed upon Said Mehmed Pasha. Upon the order of Mahmud, she was betrothed to the Admiral of the Fleet Mehmed Said Pasha in 1835. A dowry was prepared within a year.

Julia Pardoe reports an incident that occurred on the occasion of Mihrimah's wedding. In fact, at the time of composing her dowry, the palace informed Mahmud that there were no more imperial jewels for the princess, because Saliha Sultan, Mihrimah's half-sister who had married the year before, had demanded them all for herself. She had not worn them, because she was too proud to lead a worldly life, nor returned them. Mahmud proposed to sell them, but Saliha replied that no one would dare to buy the jewels of a princess. Mahmud then offered to buy them himself, and Saliha was forced to accept.

The marriage took place on 28 April 1836 in the Beşiktaş Waterfront Palace, when Mihrimah was twenty four years old. After the marriage was completed, 15,000 kuruş were bestowed to Mihrimah Sultan. Her dowry was prepared in Serasker.

The wedding shows for Mihrimah were held in the vicinity of Dolmabahçe like those of Saliha Sultan. These entertainments lasted ten days. Finally, an enormous bride regiment was organized and she was sent to her palace. The marriage was consummated on 9 May 1836 in the Bebek Palace. At the wedding of Mihrimah Sultan, where tremendous lighting shows were held and the people watched with great enthusiasm and admiration.

Shortly after his marriage to Mihrimah, Said Pasha incurred her father's displeasure and had been exiled to Bursa, much to his wife's and mother-in-law's distress. At this time, her mother had sufficient influence to petition Mahmud directly to pardon her son-in-law, and did so in a letter. She followed this up with two letters of thanks, one when Mahmud granted her request, and ordered Said Pasha brought back to Istanbul, the other when he actually arrived.

The couple had one son, Sultanzade Mehmed Abdullah Bey, who was born and died on 3 July 1838.

== Death and aftermath ==
Mihrimah Sultan died on 31 August 1838 at the age of twenty six, almost two months after giving birth. Her health was already delicate because she suffered from tuberculosis, which was raging in Istanbul in the nineteenth century. She was buried in the mausoleum of her grandmother in Fatih, Istanbul. Her only son died with her.

Her death was widely mourned by the court, and it was said that Mihrimah loved her father so much, that she once wished not to be alive the day he died. Her wish was fulfilled, as she died before Mahmud. Mahmud was deeply saddened by her death. He died the following year, in 1839. After her death, her father commissioned a fountain named Sultan Mahmud Fountain beside Nişancılar Mosque in Eyüp in the memory of his daughter.

Mihrimah was also immensely loved by her mother Hoşyar, who after her death declared that "my last joy died with my daughter". Her mother had commissioned a fountain in Kasımpaşa in 1840 in her memory. Her younger half-sister Adile Sultan, who was a poetess by avocation, dedicated poems to her later in her life.

== Issue ==
With Mehmed Said Pasha, Mihrimah had one son:

- Sultanzade Mehmed Abdullah Bey (3 July 1838 – 3 July 1838). Stillborn or died within a few hours of his birth.

== See also ==
- List of Ottoman princesses

== Sources ==
- Uluçay, Mustafa Çağatay (2011). Padişahların kadınları ve kızları. Ankara, Ötüken.
- Sakaoğlu, Necdet (2008). Bu mülkün kadın sultanları: Vâlide sultanlar, hâtunlar, hasekiler, kadınefendiler, sultanefendiler. Oğlak Yayıncılık. ISBN 978-9-753-29623-6.
