= Mahmud Pasha (1853–1903) =

Ottoman statesman, poet, and writer (1853–1903)

Damat Mahmud Djelaleddin Pasha
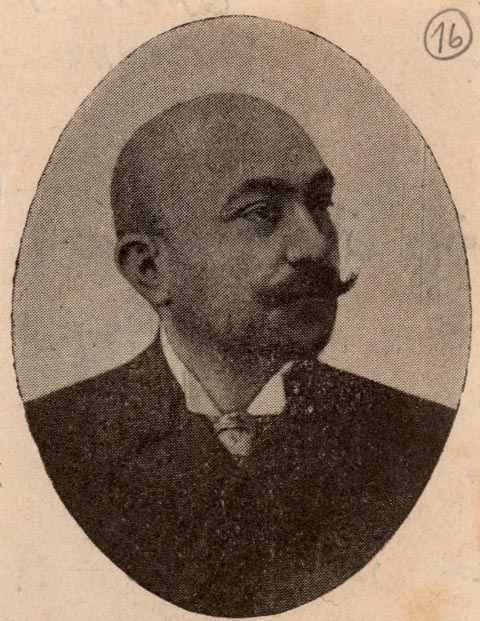
- Born: 1853; Constantinople, Ottoman Empire
- Died: 17 January 1903 (aged 49–50); Brussels
- Occupations: Statesman, poet, writer
- Spouse(s): Hacer Hanim; İffet Hanım Seniha Sultan (m. 1877)
- Children: First marriage Halil Rifat Bey; Second marriage Ali Füad Bey; Asım Bey; Third marriage Sultanzade Mehmed Sabahaddin; Sultanzade Ahmed Lütfullah Bey
- Family: Damat Gürcü Halil Rifat Pasha (father); İsmet Hanım (mother)

Damat Mahmud Djelaleddin Pasha (1853 - 17 January 1903) was an Ottoman statesman, poet and writer.

== Biography ==
His father was the Ottoman naval officer Damat Gürcü Halil Rifat Pasha of Georgian descent and his mother was Ismet Hanım, his third wife (his second wife was the late Saliha Sultan, daughter of Sultan Mahmud II). He lost his father at a young age and after special education and two years at the Ottoman embassy in Paris, improved himself and learned French. His first marriage was with Hadjer Hanim, and later he married also Iffet Hanım. By his first two wives, he had three sons. In 1876, he divorced his wives to be able to marry Seniha Sultan, the daughter of the Ottoman Sultan Abdulmejid. They married in February 1877, and he became a Damat to the Ottoman Dynasty. By Seniha, he had two sons, Sultanzade Mehmed Sabahaddin (1879–1948) and Sultanzade Ahmed Lutfullah (1880–1973).

He was for several years Minister of Justice in the Ottoman Empire, but was critical of Sultan Abdul Hamid's governance, never missing an occasion to speak out. Eventually he had had enough of being followed and spied on, so in 1899, he took both of his sons and fled to Europe, living successively in the United Kingdom, Italy and France before he died in Belgium. His sons were able to return to Istanbul only in 1908, after the declaration of the second constitution.

He died on 17 January 1903 in Brussels, and was buried in Paris at the Père Lachaise Cemetery on 23 January. His widow survived revolution and exile of the Imperial family in 1924, and had a difficult life in France until she died in 1931.

== In popular culture ==
Between 2017 and 2021, he was played by actor Hakan Boyav in TRT's Payitaht: Abdülhamid series.

== Sources ==
- Bardakçı, Murat (2017). Neslishah: The Last Ottoman Princess. Oxford University Press. ISBN 978-9-774-16837-6.
