= Aşubcan Kadın =

Consort of Sultan Mahmud II

- Born: c. 1793
- Died: 10 June 1870 (aged 76–77); Constantinople, Ottoman Empire (now Istanbul, Turkey)
- Burial: Mahmud II Mausoleum, Divanyolu Street, Istanbul
- Spouse: Mahmud II
- Issue: Ayşe Sultan; Saliha Sultan; Şah Sultan
Names
- Turkish: Aşubcan Kadın; Ottoman Turkish: آشوب جان قادین
- House: Ottoman (by marriage)
- Religion: Sunni Islam

Aşubcan Kadın (Ottoman Turkish: آشوب جان قادین; "Queen bee's spirit"; c. 1793 – 10 June 1870), also called Aşubican Kadın, was a consort of Sultan Mahmud II of the Ottoman Empire.

== Life ==
Daughter of a Bulgarian delegate and born in 1793, Aşubcan, also called Aşubican, entered Mahmud II's harem on 1808, and was given the title of "Fifth Kadın" (consorts). On 5 July 1809 she gave birth to her first daughter, Ayşe Sultan, who died in February 1810. On 16 June 1811 she gave birth to her second daughter Saliha Sultan in the Topkapı Palace. The traditional birth ceremony was arranged in the imperial harem, which was attended by Mahmud's mother, wives, and sisters. On this occasion, Valide Nakşidil Sultan presented Aşubcan with presents. A year later, she gave birth to a third daughter, Şah Sultan, born on 22 May 1812, who died at the age of two in September 1814.

She was then elevated to the title of "Fourth Kadın", and later to the title of "Third Kadın" and finally "Second Kadın". In 1834, her daughter married Damat Gürcü Halil Rifat Pasha, and went to live in Fındıklı Palace.

After Mahmud's death in 1839, his son Sultan Abdulmejid I, son of Bezmiâlem Sultan, ascended the throne. Aşubcan moved to live in the Beşiktaş waterfront Palace, and later in Çamlıca, and Maçka Palaces. In 1843 her only surviving daughter also died. In 1861, after the death of Abdulmejid, his half-brother Sultan Abdulaziz, son of Pertevniyal Kadin, ascended the throne. Aşubcan often wrote letters to both of her stepsons, and was even visited by them at her palace.

== Death ==
Aşubcan Kadın died on 10 June 1870, and was buried the mausoleum of her husband located at the Divanyolu Street, Istanbul.

== Issue ==
Together with Mahmud, Aşubcan had at least three children, three daughters:

- Ayşe Sultan (5 July 1809 – February 1810). Buried in the Nuruosmaniye Mosque.
- Saliha Sultan (Topkapı Palace, 16 June 1811 – Istanbul, Turkey, 5 February 1843, buried in Sultan Mahmud II Mausoleum, Divanyolu, Istanbul).
- Şah Sultan (22 May 1812 – September 1814, buried in Nuruosmaniye Mosque, Fatih, Istanbul).

== In popular culture ==
- In 2018 Turkish historical fiction TV series Kalbimin Sultanı, Aşubcan is portrayed by Turkish actress Açelya Devrim Yılhan.

== See also ==
- Ottoman Imperial Harem
- List of consorts of the Ottoman sultans

== Sources ==
- Sakaoğlu, Necdet (2008). Bu Mülkün Kadın Sultanları. Beyoğlu, İstanbul : Oğlak Yayıncılık ve Reklamcılık. ISBN 978-9-753-29299-3.
- Uluçay, Mustafa Çağatay (1956). Haremʼden mektuplar I - Volume 1. Vakit Matbaası.
- Uluçay, Mustafa Çağatay (2011). Padişahların kadınları ve kızları. Ankara: Ötüken. ISBN 978-9-754-37840-5.
