= Mehmed Sabahaddin =

Ottoman sociologist and intellectual (1879–1948)

- His Highness Prince Sultanzade Sabahaddin
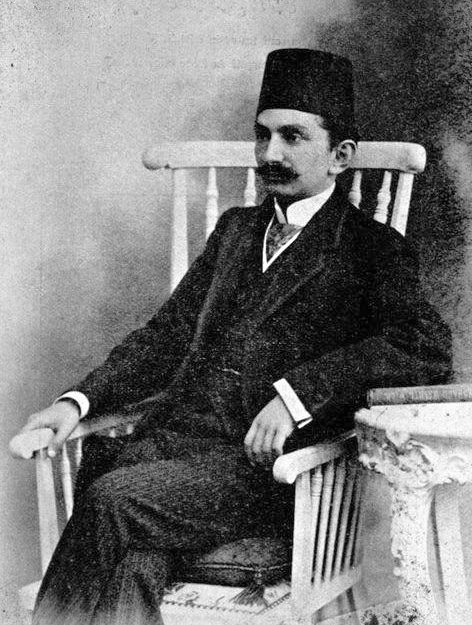
- Born: 13 February 1879; Constantinople, Ottoman Empire
- Died: 30 June 1948 (aged 69); Neuchâtel, Switzerland
- Spouse: Tabinak Hanım; Kamuran Hanım
- Issue: First marriage Fethiye Kendi Sabahaddin
- Dynasty: House of Osman
- Father: Mahmud Celaleddin Pasha
- Mother: Seniha Sultan
- Religion: Sunni Islam

Sultanzade Mehmed Sabahaddin (13 February 1879 – 30 June 1948) was an Ottoman prince, sociologist, and intellectual. Because of his threat to the ruling House of Osman, of which he was a member, and his political activity and push for democracy in the late 19th and early 20th centuries, he was exiled. He was one of the founders of the short-lived Liberty Party.

Although part of the ruling Ottoman dynasty through his mother, Seniha Sultan, Sabahaddin was known as a Young Turk and was opposed to the absolute rule of Abdul Hamid II. As a follower of Émile Durkheim, Sabahaddin is considered to be one of the founders of sociology in Turkey, influencing thinkers such as Le Play. He established several organizations which advocated for decentralization and privatization: The Private Initiative and Decentralization Committee (Turkish: Teşebbüs-i Şahsi ve Adem-i Merkeziyet Cemiyeti) in 1902, the Liberty Party in 1908, and the Freedom and Accord Party in 1911. All of these organizations were the main opposition to the Committee of Union and Progress. His world views are considered to be the basis of Turkish center-right politics.

== Biography ==
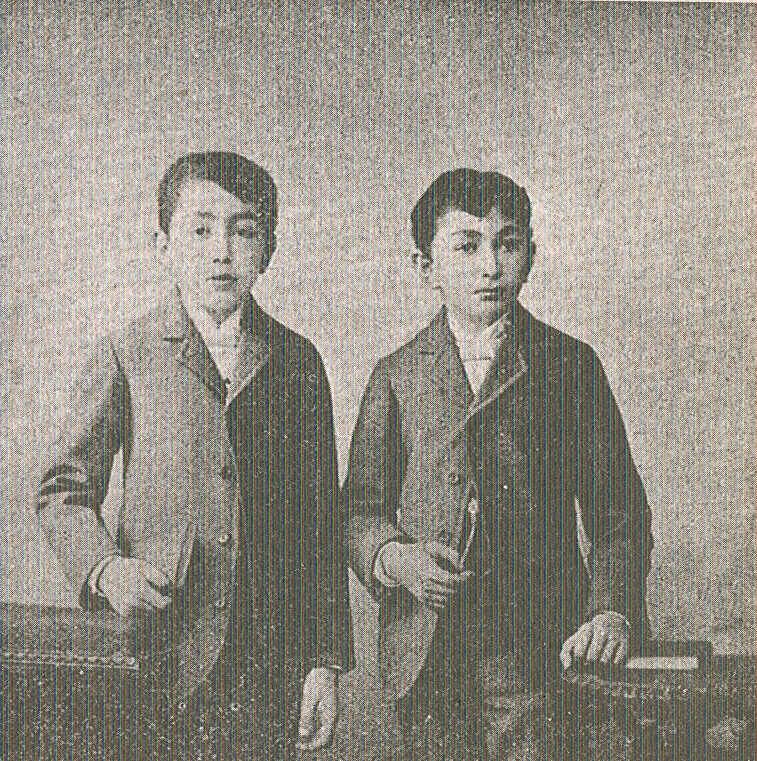
Sabahaddin (right) with his brother Lütfullah.

Mehmed Sabahaddin was born in Istanbul in 1879. His mother was Seniha Sultan, daughter of Ottoman Sultan Abdulmejid I and Nalandil Hanım, and half-sister to Abdul Hamid II. His grandfather being Sultan Abdulmejid, and his uncles were Murad V, Abdulhamid II, Mehmed V, and Mehmed VI. His father was Mahmud Celaleddin Pasha, the son of Grand Admiral Damat Gürcü Halil Rifat Pasha. Having royal blood on his maternal side made him a Sultanzade, but he preferred to use the title Prince.

Sabahaddin had a versatile and Western education at the Ottoman palace. For a time, he was put under house arrest when his father, who was a damat of the palace and a close friend of Sultan Abdul Hamid II, was dismissed from office on the grounds of involvement in the Raid on the Çırağan Palace. Sabahaddin Efendi showed great interest in natural sciences and learned French.

Sabahaddin fled the Ottoman Empire in late 1899 with his brother Ahmed Lutfullah and his father, who had fallen out with Abdul Hamid II, first to Great Britain, then to Geneva, to join the Young Turks. After a warning by the Federal Council of Geneva in 1900, they left the city for Paris. Prince Sabahaddin rose rapidly among the Young Turks in France, having the advantage of being a member of the royal family and son of a government minister. In France, he met Edmond Demolins, and became a follower of the school of social sciences.

Sabahaddin advocated privatized economic policies and decentralized government, in opposition to national economy. This division plagued the Young Turk movement before 1908 and would be the central dispute in the more institutionalized political discourse of the Second Constitutional Era. In the first phase of his career in political opposition (1900–1908), he sought unity between Christians and Muslims, and met with leaders from the respective groups.

On February 4, 1902 Prince Sabahaddin convened what was called the "First Congress of Ottoman Opposition". Ideological differences between the Young Turks were on full display. Prince Sabahaddin was a proponent of overthrowing Abdul Hamid II with British assistance. Ahmed Rıza disagreed with revolution, especially foreign intervention. When asked what sort of government would replace the Hamidian regime, Prince Sabahaddin and his supporters answered "a decentralized government based on the cooperation of the local and foreign bourgeoisie, supporting individual initiatives", while Ahmed Rıza's supporters in the Committee of Union and Progress defended a "centralized Constitutional Monarchy". This division is considered to have created the paradigm of the center-right and center-left in Turkey today.

After the First Congress of Ottoman Opposition, Prince Sabahaddin used his supposed majority mandate to turn the congress into a committee known as the Ottoman Freedom-Lover's Committee, and made an unsuccessful coup attempt in 1902. In 1906 after developing an obsession with Anglo-Saxon civilization he founded the Private Initiative and Decentralization Committee. He published the journal Terakki, which was the publication organ of the society, and defended the principles of decentralization in administration and free enterprise in economics. The journal won support among the minorities and merchants of the empire. Branches of the society were opened in Istanbul, Izmir, Alanya and Damascus.

After the Young Turk Revolution in 1908 and the seizure of power by the CUP, Prince Sabahaddin returned to the Ottoman Empire. He founded the Liberty Party, which largely professed his own politics and opposed the CUP. The party was unsuccessful in the 1908 general election. The party was soon accused of playing a role in the 31 March Incident and was shuttered. Sabahaddin was arrested but released through the mediation of Mahmut Şevket Pasha and Hurşit Pasha. Later, when he was tried in absentia for being involved in this incident and sentenced to death, he fled abroad again.

He played a role in the establishment of the Freedom and Accord Party. After the Raid on the Sublime Porte on 23 January 1913, his supporters planned to overthrow the government and put him into power by carrying out a similar operation. When the operation commenced on June 11, 1913, they only managed to assassinate Shevket Pasha. The assassins were caught and executed, and Prince Sabahaddin was forced to flee Paris. He lived in various cities in Europe during World War I, and was head of the opposition in exile in western Switzerland.

In 1919, Sabahaddin returned to Istanbul after the end of the Union and Progress regime. Upon his return to Turkey, he published his work Türkiye Nasıl Kurtarılabilir? (How Can Turkey Be Saved?), which was banned during the CUP regime. After World War I, he initially did not support or oppose the Turkish War of Independence but later, after the Occupation of Constantinople, he started to directly oppose Mustafa Kemal. After the proclamation of the Turkish Republic, in 1924 he was forced to leave the country due to the law exiling members of the House of Osman. Prince Sabahaddin returned to Switzerland. In his autobiography Witness (1962, first edition; 1974, revised and enlarged second edition), John G. Bennett notes that in Sabahaddin's later years, because of his frustrations, disappointments, and exile he reportedly had become an alcoholic and had died in 1948, in Neuchâtel, in great poverty.

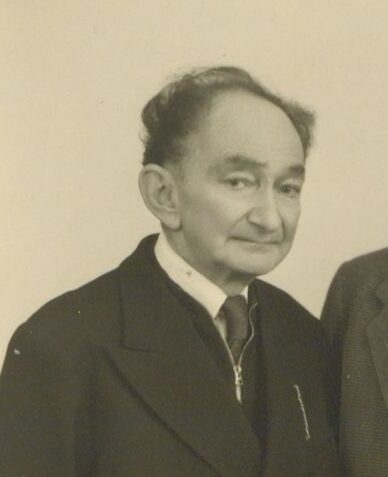
Prince Sabahaddin in 1946

His body was brought to Turkey in 1952; and he was buried in the Halil Rıfat Pasha Tomb in the Eyüpsultan district of Istanbul, where his father and grandfather's graves are located.

== Family ==
Sabahaddin had two wives:

- Tabinak Hanım (m. 1898 - div. 14 August 1961), with whom he had one daughter:
  - Fethiye Kendi Hanım Sabahaddin (1899 - 1986). Unmarried without issue.
- Kamuran Hanım. Tabinak's younger sister, they married after Sabahaddin was divorced by his first wife.

== Influences on other people ==
Sabahaddin unknowingly influenced many people including John G. Bennett, who was introduced to him by Satvet Lutfi Bey (Satvet Lütfi Tozan) in 1920 while Bennett was working as an intelligence officer for the British Army occupying Istanbul after the First World War. Sabahaddin brought Bennett into the world of spirituality by encouraging him to read Les Grands Initiés ("The Great Initiates") by Édouard Schuré. He had also introduced Bennett to an English woman living in Turkey, Winifred "Polly" Beaumont, whom Bennett later married. Among others to whom Sabahaddin had introduced Bennett, the most influential was G.I. Gurdjieff – a man Bennett regarded as his mentor and master for the rest of his life.

== Works ==
- Türkiye Nasıl Kurtarılabilir?
- Teşebbüs-ü Şahsi ve Tevsi-i Mezuniyet Hakkında Bir İzah
- Teşebbüs-ü Şahsi ve Adem-i Merkeziyet Hakkında İkinci Bir İzah
- İttihat ve Terakki Cemiyetine Açık Mektuplar
- Mesleğimiz Hakkında Üçüncü ve Son Bir İzah

== Ancestry ==
Ancestors of Mehmed Sabahaddin

4. Damat Gürcü Halil Rifat Pasha
2. Mahmud Celeleddin Pasha
5. Ismet Hanım
1. Sultanzade Sabahaddin
24. Abdul Hamid I
12. Mahmud II
25. Nakşidil Sultan
6. Abdulmejid I
13. Bezmiâlem Sultan
3. Seniha Sultan
14. Natıkhu Çipakue
7. Nalandil Hanım

== See also ==
- Seniha Sultan
