= Hoşyar Kadın =

Consort of Ottoman Sultan Mahmud II

- Died: c. 1859; Mecca, Habesh Eyalet, Ottoman Empire
- Burial: Mecca, Saudi Arabia
- Spouse: Mahmud II (m. 1810; died 1839)
- Issue: Mihrimah Sultan; Zeynep Sultan
Names
- Turkish: Haciye Hoşyar Kadın; Ottoman Turkish: حاجیه خوشیار قادین
- House: Ottoman (by marriage)
- Religion: Sunni Islam

Haciye Hoşyar Kadın (Ottoman Turkish: حاجیه خوشیار قادین; "pleasant lover"; died c. 1859) was a consort of Sultan Mahmud II of the Ottoman Empire.

== Early life ==
Hoşyar Kadın was educated in the house of Beyhan Sultan, daughter of Sultan Mustafa III, and cousin of Sultan Mahmud and she was called her "spiritual daughter". She was tall and had dark brown hair, with pale skin, and was described as Mahmud's most beautiful consort.

== Marriage ==
In 1811, during a grand banquet that Beyhan Sultan gave to Mahmud, he asked to have Hoşyar as his consort. Beyhan consented to his offer and, after some days, sent her to the imperial harem, with a grand ceremony, and with magnificent presents as her dower. For ten days, the Sultan was most assiduous in his attentions.

She was given the title of Fourth Consort. After nine months, on 29 June 1812, she gave birth to her first daughter, Mihrimah Sultan. This was followed three years later by another daughter, Zeynep Sultan, born on 18 April 1815, who died at the age of ten months in February 1816. Hoşyar was then elevated first to Third Consort, and later to Second Consort.

When the time came to find a husband for Mihrimah Sultan, Hoşyar resolved that Mihrimah should make her own choice. She showed her the portraits of several young men, each worthy of her hand. Mihrimah chose Said Pasha, and the two married in 1835.

Shortly after his marriage to her daughter, Said Pasha incurred Mahmud's displeasure and was exiled to Bursa, to his wife's and mother-in-law's distress. At this time, Hoşyar was sufficiently sure of her influence to petition Mahmud directly and did so in a letter. She followed this up with two letters of thanks, one when Mahmud granted her request and ordered Said Pasha brought back to Istanbul, the other when he arrived.

Mihrimah died in 1838, and with her, Hoşyar's last solace disappeared. With the death of Mahmud in 1839, she lost her influence at the court.

== Widowhood ==
Following Mahmud's death, she settled in her palace in Maçka. In later years she settled in her palace, situated at Tarlabaşı, facing Dolmabahçe Palace. She met Melek Hanim, wife of grand vizier Kıbrıslı Mehmed Emin Pasha. Melek described her as tall and fair-haired, and her skin, exceedingly white, set off the freshness of her complexion. Melek also stressed that Hoşyar was gifted with a lively spirit and a rare intelligence, but that nevertheless she was bored by the monotony of her life. Knowing that Melek had been in Europe, Hoşyar interrogated her as to the manners and customs of the Christians, the way the towns were built, the balls, theatres, systems of lighting by gas, the architecture of the palaces, and a thousand other matters.

Her stepson, Abdulmejid I, was devoted to his step-mother and always held her in high regard. He had granted her the permission to perform the Hajj. Moreover, he also granted several palaces and lands to her in order to alleviate her sorrow over the loss of her daughter, and also supported her financially.

Bezmiâlem Sultan, the mother of Sultan Abdulmejid I always regarded her with a jealous eye. She scarcely allowed her to receive, once a month, a visit from Said Pasha when he was in Istanbul. Moreover, she was never allowed to hear of her daughter.

In 1840, she commissioned a fountain in Elhac, Kasımpaşa in the memory of her daughter. In 1844, she commissioned a primary school in Burgaz alongside a mosque in the memory of her daughter and Beyhan Sultan. She also commissioned a mosque in Yozgat, and constructed another primary school again in the name of her daughter.

== Death ==
In 1859, Hoşyar went for a pilgrimage (Hajj) to Mecca, thus earning the title "Haciye" and died there in the same year. She was buried there. Her belongings were sent to Istanbul by Serasker Rıza Pasha.

== Issue ==
Together with Mahmud, Hoşyar had two daughters:

- Mihrimah Sultan (Topkapı Palace, 29 June 1812 – Istanbul, Turkey, 31 August 1838, buried in Nakşidil Sultan Mausoleum). She married once at had a son.
- Zeynep Sultan (18 April 1815 – February 1816). Buried in the Nuruosmaniye Mosque.

== In popular culture ==
- In 2018 Turkish historical fiction TV series Kalbimin Sultanı, Hoşyar is portrayed by Turkish actress Beste Kökdemir.

== See also ==
- Ottoman Imperial Harem
- List of consorts of the Ottoman sultans

== Sources ==
- Hanim, Melek (1872). Thirty years in the harem: or, The autobiography of Melek-Hanum, wife of H.H. Kibrizli-Mehemet-Pasha.
- Uluçay, Mustafa Çağatay (2011). Padişahların kadınları ve kızları. Ötüken. ISBN 978-9-754-37840-5.
- Sakaoğlu, Necdet (2008). Bu mülkün kadın sultanları: Vâlide sultanlar, hâtunlar, hasekiler, kadınefendiler, sultanefendiler. Oğlak Yayıncılık. ISBN 978-9-753-29623-6.
