= Damat Gürcü Halil Rifat Pasha =

Ottoman statesman

Gürcü · Damat Halil Rifat Pasha
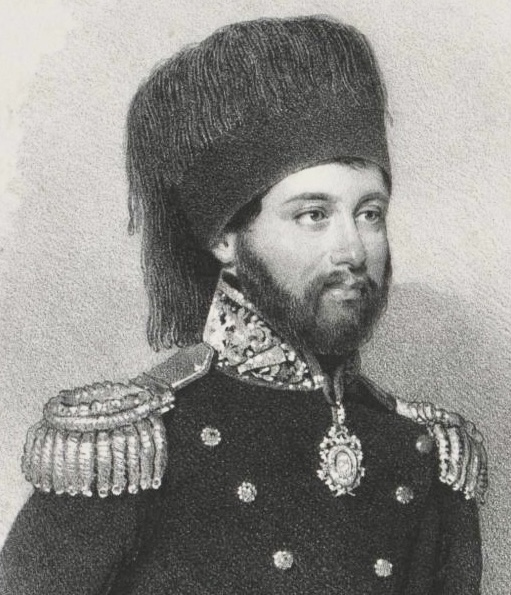

Grand Admiral of the Ottoman Empire
- In office 1830–1832
- Monarch: Mahmud II
- Preceded by: Pabuççu Ahmed Pasha
- Succeeded by: Çengeloğlu Tahir Mehmet Pasha
- In office 1843–1845
- Preceded by: Çengeloğlu Tahir Mehmet Pasha
- Succeeded by: Damat Mehmed Ali Pasha
- In office 1847–1848
- Preceded by: Damat Mehmed Ali Pasha
- Succeeded by: Damat Mehmed Ali Pasha
- In office 1854–1855
- Monarch: Abdulmejid I
- Preceded by: Kıbrıslı Mehmed Pasha
- Succeeded by: Damat Mehmed Ali Pasha

Personal details
- Born: c. 1795 Georgia
- Died: 4 March 1856 (aged 58-59) Constantinople, Ottoman Empire (present day Istanbul, Turkey
- Spouse(s): Fülane Hanim; Saliha Sultan; Ismet Hanım
- Children: First marriage Ali Bey; Second marriage Sultanzade Abdülhamid Bey Efendi; Sultanzade Cavid Bey Efendi; Ayşe Şadıka Hanımsultan; Third marriage Asaf Mahmud Celaleddin Pasha

Damat Gürcü Halil Rifat Pasha, (Ottoman Turkish: داماد کرجی خلیل رفعت پاشا; c. 1795 – 3 March 1856) was an Ottoman admiral and statesman of Georgian origin. He served in the periods of Mahmud II and Abdulmejid I.

== Career ==
Halil Rifat Pasha was a slave, protégé and later rival of Koca Hüsrev Mehmed Pasha. He first served as the ambassador to Russia from 1829 to 1830. He then served as grand admiral for four times from 1830 to 1832, 1843–1845, 1847–1848 and 1854–1855, as well as chairman of the Supreme Council of Judicial Ordinances ("Meclis-i Vâlâ") from 1842 to 1845 and 1849–1850. He also served as Serasker from 1836 to 1838 and 1839–1840. This placed him in a good position to build and maintain a conservative group, usually in corporation with Hüsrev Pasha.

== Family ==
Halil Rifat had three wives:

- Fülane Hanim. Unknown wife whom he divorced to marry Saliha Sultan, daughter of Mahmud II. From her he had at least one son:
  - Ali Bey, ambassador to Austria. He in turn had a son:
    - Ali Füad Ürfi Bey. He married Ayşe Şadika Hanımsultan, daughter of Cemile Sultan (granddaughter of Sultan Mahmud II). By her he had two daughters:
      - Kerime Hanım
      - Naime Hanım
- Saliha Sultan. Daughter of the sultan Mahmud II, they married on 22 May 1834. She died in February 1843. Their marriage was an unhappy one, but they had two sons and a daughter together:
  - Sultanzade Abdülhamid Bey Efendi (2 March 1835 - March 1837).
  - Sultanzade Cavid Bey Efendi (1837 -?).
  - Ayşe Şadıka Hanımsultan (1841 - 1886). She married Server Pasha, son of Said Server Efendi. She had at least three daughters:
    - Ayşe Hanim.
    - Azize Hanim. She married Hariciyeci Suad Bey and had two sons, Ziya Songülen and Mahmud Bey, and a daughter, Fehire Hanim.
    - Fatma Hanim. She married Fehmi Bey, son of the grand vizier Mehmed Esad Saffet Pasha, and had a son, Halil Bey, and a daughter, Belkis Hanim.
- Ismet Hanim. He married her after Saliha's death. From her he had a son:
  - Asaf Mahmud Celaleddin Pasha (1853 - 1903). He had three wives:
    - Hacer Hanim. From her he had a son:
      - Halil Rifat Bey
    - Iffet Hanim. By her he had two sons:
      - Ali Füad Bey
      - Asım Bey
    - Seniha Sultan, daughter of Sultan Abdülmejid I and granddaughter of Sultan Mahmud II. They married in February 1877 and by her he had two sons:
      - Sultanzade Mehmed Sabahaddin (13 February 1879 – 30 June 1948). He had two wives and a daughter.
      - Sultanzade Ahmed Lütfullah Bey. He had two wives, Kamran Hanim and a Hungarian woman with whom he had a son, Nadi Bey.

== Death ==
Hali Rifat Pasha died in Constantinople, Ottoman Empire (present day Istanbul, Turkey) on 3 March 1856.

== See also ==
- List of Kapudan Pashas
