= The City of the Magyar =

1840 book by Julia Pardoe

- Title page for The City of the Magyar (1840)
- Author: Julia Pardoe
- Language: English
- Genre: Travel
- Publication date: 1840

The City of the Magyar, originally published in 1840, is a book about Hungary by English writer Julia Pardoe. The first volume of the book is an account of travelling from east to west across the country and records buildings, events, people, landscape, and institutions. The second volume is an inquiry into Hungary's national character, and the third volume is an account of Hungary's folklore, history, and social customs.

Pardoe was the first person to describe many of Hungary's institutions. Much of her book is based on interviews with powerful people in Hungarian society, and the book has no representatives from Hungary's lowest classes.
