= Nalandil Hanım =

Consort of Ottoman Sultan Abdulmejid I

- Born: 1823
- Died: c. 1865 (aged 41–42); Feriye Palace, Constantinople, Ottoman Empire (present day Istanbul, Turkey)
- Burial: New Ladies Mausoleum Mausoleum, New Mosque, Istanbul
- Consort: Abdulmejid I (m. 1851; died 1861)
- Issue: Seniha Sultan; Şehzade Mehmed Abdülsamed; Şehime Sultan
Names
- Turkish: Nalandil Hanım; Ottoman Turkish: نالان دل خانم
- House: Ottoman (by marriage)
- Father: Çıpakue Natikhu Bey
- Religion: Sunni Islam

Nalandil Hanım (Ottoman Turkish: نالان دل خانم; "beloved nightingale" or "honest heart"; 1823 – c. 1865) was a consort of Sultan Abdulmejid I of the Ottoman Empire.

== Life ==
Nalandil was born in 1823. She was a Circassian princess of the Natuhay tribe and daughter of Prince Çıpakue Natıkhu Bey, and had a sister, Terbiye Hanim, treasurer of the harem. Later, Terbiye married a Khalil Bey.

Nalandil Hanım married Abdulmejid in 1851. She was given the title of "Fourth Ikbal". On 5 December 1851, she gave birth to her first child, a daughter, Seniha Sultan, in the Old Çırağan Palace. Seniha Sultan married Mahmud Celaleddin Pasha in 1876 and had two sons from this marriage. Her elder son was Prince Sabahaddin Bey, one of the founders of the New Ottoman Society.

Towards the end of 1852, she was elevated to the title of "Third Ikbal", and in 1853, to the title of "Second Ikbal". On 20 March 1853, she gave birth to her second child, a son, Şehzade Mehmed Abdülsamed. The prince died at the age of two on 5 May 1855.

In 1854, she was elevated to the title of "Senior Ikbal". On 1 March 1855, she gave birth to her third child, a daughter, Şehime Sultan, in the Old Beylerbeyi Palace. The princess died at the age of two on 21 May 1857.

== Death ==
After Abdulmejid's death in 1861, Nalandil settled in the Feriye Palace. She died in 1865 of tuberculosis, and was buried in the Mausoleum of New Ladies, at New Mosque, Istanbul. Her wealth was given to her daughter.

== Issue ==
| Name | Birth | Death | Notes |
|---|---|---|---|
| Seniha Sultan | 5 December 1851 | 15 September 1931 | married once, and had issue, two sons |
| Şehzade Mehmed Abdülsamed | 20 March 1853 | 5 May 1855 | buried in Yavuz Selim Mosque |
| Şehime Sultan | 1 March 1855 | 21 May 1857 | buried in Tomb of Gülistü Kadın |

== In literature ==
- Nalandil is a character in Hıfzı Topuz's historical novel Abdülmecit: İmparatorluk Çökerken Sarayda 22 Yıl: Roman (2009).

== See also ==
- Ikbal (title)
- Ottoman Imperial Harem
- List of consorts of the Ottoman sultans

== Sources ==
- Uluçay, M. Çağatay (2011). Padişahların kadınları ve kızları. Ötüken. ISBN 978-9-754-37840-5.
- Sakaoğlu, Necdet (2008). Bu Mülkün Kadın Sultanları: Vâlide Sultanlar, Hâtunlar, Hasekiler, Kadınefendiler, Sultanefendiler. Oğlak Yayıncılık. ISBN 978-6-051-71079-2.
- Brookes, Douglas Scott (2010). The Concubine, the Princess, and the Teacher: Voices from the Ottoman Harem. University of Texas Press. ISBN 978-0-292-78335-5.
- Paşa, Ahmed Cevdet (1960). Tezâkir. [2]. 13 - 20, Volume 2. Türk Tarih Kurumu Basımevi.
