= Seniha Sultan =

Ottoman princess (1851–1931)

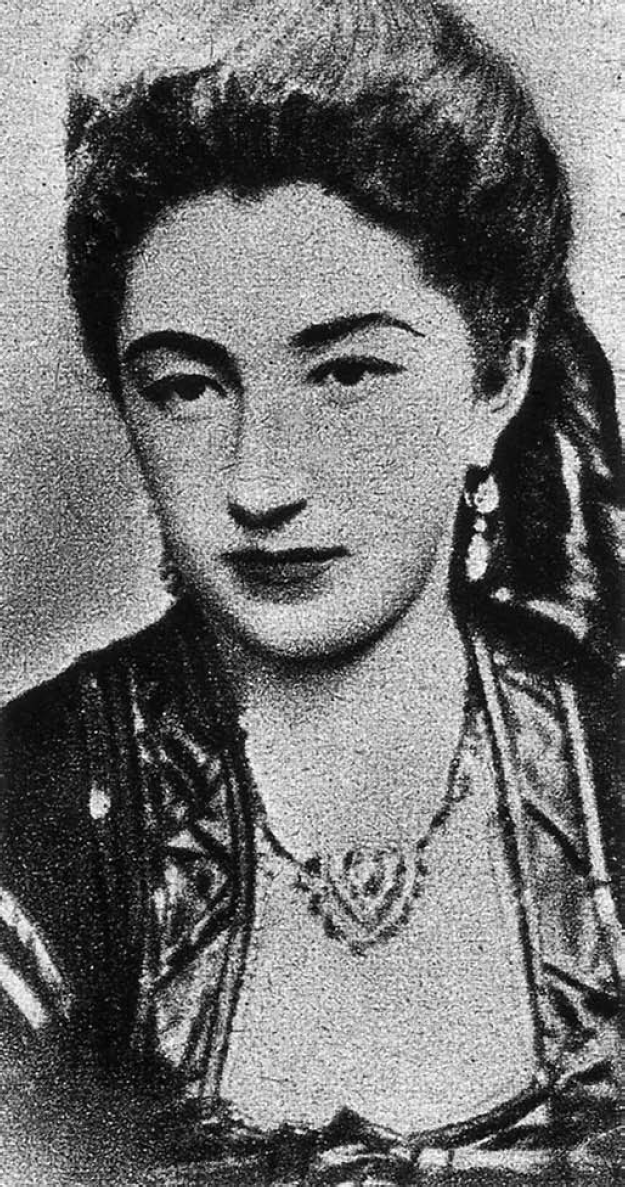
- Born: 5 December 1851; Çırağan Palace, Constantinople, Ottoman Empire
- Died: 15 September 1931 (aged 79); Villa Carabacel, Nice, France
- Burial: Cemetery of the Sulaymaniyya Takiyya, Damascus, Syria
- Spouse: Asaf Mahmud Celaleddin Pasha (m. 1877; died 1903)
- Issue: Sultanzade Mehmed Sabahaddin; Sultanzade Ahmed Lütfullah Bey
- Dynasty: Ottoman
- Father: Abdulmejid I
- Mother: Nalandil Hanım
- Religion: Sunni Islam

Seniha Sultan (Ottoman Turkish: سنیحه سلطان; 5 December 1851 – 15 September 1931) was an Ottoman princess, the daughter of Sultan Abdulmejid I and Nalandil Hanım. She was the half-sister of Sultans Murad V, Abdul Hamid II, Mehmed V, and Mehmed VI.

== Early life ==
Seniha Sultan was born on 5 December 1851 in the Çırağan Palace. Her father was Sultan Abdulmejid I and her mother was Nalandil Hanım. She was the eldest child of her mother. She had a brother Şehzade Mehmed Abdüssamed, one year younger than her and a sister Şehime Sultan, three years younger than her. Both her siblings died in infancy. Her father died when Seniha was ten and her mother died when she was fourteen.

== Marriage ==
In 1876, her half-brother Sultan Abdul Hamid II betrothed her to Asaf Mahmud Celaleddin Pasha, who was two years her junior, had a promising future, and was the son of Grand Admiral Damat Gürcü Halil Rifat Pasha. Her dowry was prepared with her half-sisters Behice Sultan, Mediha Sultan and Naile Sultan. The marriage contract was concluded on 5 December 1876 at the Yıldız Palace. However, the wedding was delayed because of the death of her elder sister Behice Sultan, who had been sick with tuberculosis since childhood and to whom Seniha had been very close, constantly writing her affectionate letters. The wedding finally took place on 10 February 1877. In 1879, she gave birth to her first son Sultanzade Sabahaddin Bey, and a year later to her second son Sultanzade Ahmed Lütfullâh Bey.

Among Seniha's ladies-in-waiting was Resan Hanım, who would later become one of the consorts of her half-brother Murad V. Her other two ladies, Dilaviz Hanim and Zeliha Vasfıcihan Hanım, married Murad's son Şehzade Mehmed Selaheddin.

Seniha hadn't been on good terms with Abdul Hamid for unknown reasons, and so in 1878, she and her husband, and her siblings including her brothers Prince Ahmed Kemaleddin, and Prince Selim Suleiman, and sister Princess Fatma, were all involved in the Ali Suavi incident with the objective of restoring Murad to the throne. In October 1898, she met with the German Empress Augusta Victoria in the harem of the Yıldız Palace, when the latter visited Istanbul for a second time with her husband Emperor Wilhelm In her memoir, Ayşe Sultan, daughter of Abdülhamid II, remembered: "Familiar as he was with his sisters' [Seniha Sultan and Mediha Sultan] habit of chattering away rapidly and guffawing, Abdülhamid II had counseled and beseeched them to behave in a dignified fashion, but nonetheless the sisters fell back on their old habits. Baba [the Sultan Abdülhamid II] felt compelled to tell the Empress, 'Please forgive my sisters, they're a bit nervous.'".

Seniha Sultan's husband was very critical of her brother Abdul Hamid's governance, never missing an occasion to speak out. Eventually he had had enough of being followed and spied on, so in 1899, he took both of his sons fled to Europe, where four years later he died in Belgium and was buried in Paris. Her sons were able to return to Istanbul only in 1908, after the declaration of the second constitution. For this reason she was not particularly welcome at the palace.

== Exile and death ==
At the exile of the imperial family in March 1924, Seniha was the oldest living Ottoman princess, age seventy-three. She had no money of her own, and her sons were too busy with their affairs to care of her, so she went to exile alone. Her half-brother, the deposed Sultan Mehmed, who went to live in San Remo gave her refuge in his home, the Villa Magnolia, where she lived until his death in 1926. After Mehmed's death, she didn't have enough money on her own to rent a house, and so slept in the public gardens of Cimiez, Nice. Somehow her younger son Lütfullah figured out about his mothers way of living, he came to Nice, and took his mother to Abdulmejid II's Villa, who gave her a room in the attic. Where she lived in a miserable way.

Seniha Sultan died at the Villa Carabacel on 15 September 1931 at age seventy-nine in Nice, France the last surviving child of Abdulmejid, and was buried in the cemetery of the Sulaymaniyya Takiyya in Damascus.

Her burial was very difficult. In Nice at the time there were no Muslim cemeteries, so she must be buried in a Muslim country, but that was an expensive undertaking and her family had no money, not even to pay the rent of a place in the morgue for a long time, where her body, embalmed at the cheapest rate, had been placed in waiting for a solution.

However, her family, especially Abdülmecid II, absolutely did not want to bury her in a mass grave. So he instructed his son, Ömer Faruk Efendi, and Şehzade Osman Fuad Efendi, a descendant of Murad V, to request the money for the burial from Jefferson Cohn & Ranz, the company that had been officially appointed to reclaim the properties of the Ottoman family on their behalf. The negotiation was long and difficult, but when the princes threatened to dissolve the contract they managed to get the money.

The body of Seniha Sultan followed the same route as that of her brother Sultan Mehmed VI Vahideddin: to Beirut by boat, then from there to Syria, where she was buried.

== Personality ==
Seniha was described as a strong and free woman who was political minded, and in many ways a woman ahead of her time. She was judged to be beautiful and regal in appearance, but she was not particularly welcome at court because of her cheeky and undignified attitudes. She wore her hair short and refused to let it grow and had a deep voice. She always spoke quickly and directly.

She used to wear dresses of the most superb cloth, with her tiara on her head on formal occasions, and she also wore gowns with long trains in the European fashion spreading out behind her. In manner, she was entirely unconstrained. Often, as did her half-sister Mediha Sultan, she would burst into laughter, and she spoke rapidly and in a deep voice. When these two sisters were together chatting with their brother Abdul Hamid, they would both laugh and try to amuse him and get him to smile as though they were in competition with one another.

Seniha Sultan is known to have had performers of religious music at her palace.

According to Neslişah Sultan and Sabiha Sultan, during the exile she always dressed in black, she was thin, in fact really skinny, and had a dry skin, her niece Sabiha Sultan was really upset and sad that her aunt lives in a miserable way, whenever she visited her she kissed her hand and showed her huge respect.

== Honours ==
Styles of Seniha Sultan
- Reference style: Her Imperial Highness
- Spoken style: Your Imperial Highness

- Order of the House of Osman
- Order of the Medjidie, Jeweled
- Order of Charity, 1st Class
- Liakat Medal in Gold

== Issue ==
Name	Birth	Death	Notes
Sultanzade Mehmed Sabahaddin Bey	13 February 1879	30 June 1948	born in Ortaköy Palace; married and divorced Tabinak Hanım (1898 – 14 August 1961) and had issue a daughter, Fethiye Kendi Hanım (1899 – 1986). Later he married Tabinak's younger sister, Kamuran Hanım; died in Geneva, Switzerland
Sultanzade Ahmed Lütfullah Bey	1880	1973	born in Ortaköy Palace; married and divorced firstly Kamran Hanım, a Circassian, married secondly in 1909 a Greek lady; had issue an only son, Nadi Bey; died in Nice, France

== In popular culture ==
- In the 2017 TV series Payitaht: Abdülhamid, Seniha Sultan is portrayed by Turkish actress Selen Öztürk.

== See also ==
- List of Ottoman princesses

== Sources ==
- Bardakçı, Murat (2017). Neslishah: The Last Ottoman Princess. Oxford University Press. ISBN 978-9-774-16837-6.
- Brookes, Douglas Scott (2010). The Concubine, the Princess, and the Teacher: Voices from the Ottoman Harem. University of Texas Press. ISBN 978-0-292-78335-5.
- Sakaoğlu, Necdet (2008). Bu mülkün kadın sultanları: Vâlide sultanlar, hâtunlar, hasekiler, kadınefendiler, sultanefendiler. Oğlak Yayıncılık. ISBN 978-9-753-29623-6.
- Uluçay, Mustafa Çağatay (2011). Padişahların kadınları ve kızları. Ankara, Ötüken.
