= Julia Pardoe =

English poet and travel writer (1804–1862)

Julia Pardoe

Julia Pardoe (4 December 1804 – 26 November 1862) was an English poet, novelist, historian and travel writer. Her most popular work, The City of the Sultan and Domestic Manners of the Turks (1837), presented the Ottoman Turkish upper class with sympathy and humanity.

== Life ==
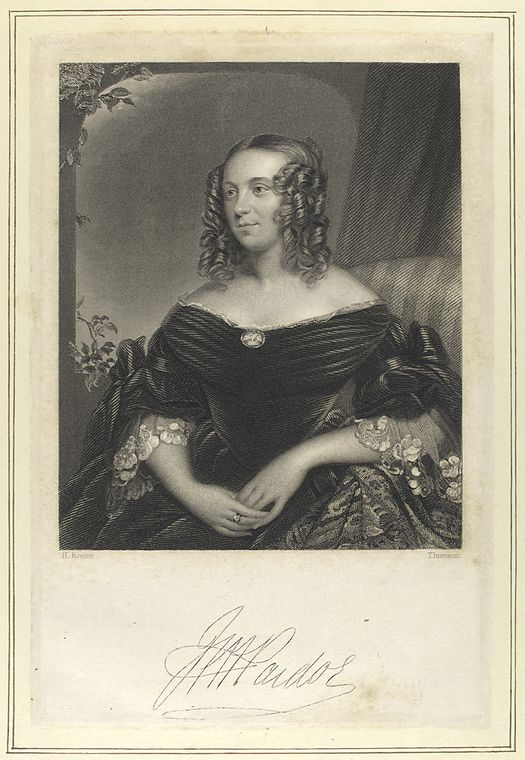
Julia Pardoe book frontispiece with her signature at the bottom.

Julia Sophia H. Pardoe was born in Beverley, Yorkshire. She was the second daughter born to Major Thomas Pardoe, who was said to be of Spanish extraction, and his wife Elizabeth. Her father served in the Royal Waggon Train in the Peninsular campaigns of the Napoleonic Wars and fought at Waterloo before retiring from the service. Pardoe was baptized at Beverley on 4 December 1804. She began writing at an early age and anonymously published her first work, The Nun: a Poetical Romance, and Two Others (1824), at the end of her teens. Like many others in the early 19th century, she moved south to avoid tuberculosis. There she found material for her first book. In 1835, she travelled to Turkey with her father, on a trip which inspired some of her most popular writings.

Pardoe lived in London until 1842, when overwork caused her to return to live with her parents, first at Perry Street, then at Northfleet, Kent. Her contributions to literature gained Pardoe a civil-list pension in January 1860.

=== Death ===
Pardoe fell victim to insomnia and chronic liver disease and died on 26 November 1862 at Upper Montagu Street, London. She was unmarried. Her death certificate gave her age as 56 at the time of her death, but baptismal records indicate that she was actually 58. She is buried in Kensal Green Cemetery in London.

== Work ==
A gifted and varied writer, Pardoe published many books on varied subjects that strayed across genres and often had an international perspective. Many of her works were originally published in serial form in British and American periodicals.

=== Poetry ===
Pardoe's first book of poetry, The Nun: a Poetical Romance, and Two Others (1824), was dedicated to her uncle, Captain William Pardoe.

=== Novels ===
Her first novel, published anonymously in 1829, was Lord Morcar of Hereward. Other works include Speculation, published in 1834, The Mardens and the Daventrys in 1835, The Romance of the Harem in 1839, and Hungarian Castle in 1842. After returning to Kent, Pardoe wrote for Fraser's Magazine, the Illuminated Magazine, and several annuals. She also published further novels: The Confessions of a Pretty Woman in 1846, The Rival Beauties in 1848, Flies in Amber in 1850, Reginald Lyle in 1854, The Jealous Wife in 1855, Lady Arabella in 1856, A Life-Struggle in 1859 and The Rich Relation in 1862.

=== Travelogues and cultural studies ===
While travelling abroad, she wrote her first travel book, Traits and Traditions of Portugal, which was published in 1833. In 1835, while at Constantinople, Julia witnessed the horrors brought on the population by the plague epidemic of that year. She was inspired by her travels with her father to publish The City of the Sultan and Domestic Manners of the Turks in 1837. Previously, Europeans had an aggrandized view of the Ottoman Turkish people, but Pardoe's work presented its upper class with sympathy and humanity. The book became so popular it was republished in a three-volume set in 1838, 1845, and 1854. In 1838, Pardoe published The Beauties of the Bosphorus and The River and the Desart. The latter is a collection of letters to a friend, offering a personal account of her own experiences. The City of Magyar, published in 1840, includes thorough research into Hungarian economic and political life. It was also considered an easier and more accessible read than her other books.

=== Histories ===
Her most enduring works, reprinted in the 20th century, were her historical writings on the French 16th and 17th-century courts. These included Louis the Fourteenth and the Court of France in the Seventeenth Century (1847), The Court and Reign of Francis the First, King of France (1849), and The Life of Marie de Medicis, Queen of France, Consort of Henri IV, and Regent of the Kingdom Under Louis XIII (1852).

=== Editing ===
In editing and working on the writing of others, Pardoe translated Guido Sorelli's La Peste (The Plague) in 1834 and edited Anita George's Memoirs of the Queens of Spain, published in 1850. In 1857, she wrote the introduction to The Thousand and One Days; a Companion to the Arabian Nights.

== Critical reception ==
Contemporaries recalled Pardoe as warm-hearted and animated, as well as extremely talented. Samuel Carter Hall said of the late author, she was a "fairy-footed, fair-haired, laughing sunny girl" in her youth, but he poked fun at her attempts to appear girlish in middle age, due to a horror of ageing.

Early in her career, Pardoe caught the attention of Princess Augusta of Cambridge, who became interested in her work and asked her to dedicate her next work Traits and Traditions of Portugal (1834) to her, which Pardoe obligingly did and it sold rapidly. Poet Elizabeth Barrett Browning praised City of Magyar as "word painting". Scholars have credited Pardoe with helping to create an enduring positive impression of Hungary in England. Her book on Francis the First was commended for being comprehensive, covering both his public and private life. However, her study of Marie de' Medici was criticized as diffuse and unfocused. In her later years, Pardoe's work was known to vary greatly in quality.

According to The Eclectic Magazine of Foreign Literature, Science, and Art in 1857, her Hungarian travelogue compares favourably with her earlier books on various cultures, exhibiting "deeper research; its statistics are peculiarly accurate, and it is on all hands admitted to be one of the best books of travel submitted to the public." The magazine also noted the usefulness of Pardoe's The Hungarian Castle (1842), which consists of three volumes of Hungarian folklore, "filling up a very little known page in the legendary history of Europe".

In 1858, J. Cordy Jeaffreson stated in Novels and Novelists that Pardoe had been "favourably circumstanced for the development of her intellect," for "delicate health at an early part of her life secured her the quiet retirement necessary for meditation and study, and her extended travels have supplied her susceptible mind and retentive memory with the best possible materials for thought."

Joseph Johnson included Pardoe in his Clever Girls of Our Time: And How They Became Famous Women (1862). His piece on her begins, "With few exceptions, Famous Women have all been Clever Girls. From their infantine years they have been celebrated for a love of books: for the perseverance which marked their pursuit of knowledge: for intense industry in their studies, and the eagerness with which they followed that which had become the end and aim of existence." He concludes that Pardoe's life and entire literary career, "its industry, its perseverance, and its unswerving continuance, are beyond all praise, as they are worthy of all emulation."

== Bibliography ==
- The Nun: a Poetical Romance, and Two Others (1824)
- Lord Morcar of Hereward (1829)
- Speculation (1834)
- Traits and Traditions of Portugal. Collected during a residence in that country (1834)
- The Mardens and the Daventrys (1835)
- The City of the Sultan (1836)
- The River and the Desert; or Recollections of the Rhine and the Chartreuse (1838)
- The Beauties of the Bosphorus (1839)
- Romance of the Harem (1839)
- Beauty and Time – a Poem – in the Blackburn Standard 10th April 1839 (1839)
- The City of the Magyar or Hungary and its Institutions (1840)
- The Hungarian Castle (1842)
- Death – a Poem – in The Leicester Chronicle 2nd Sept 1843 (1843)
- Psyche, Love and the Butterfly – a Poem – in the Leicester Chronicle 7th Sept 1844 (1844)
- Confessions of a Pretty Woman (1846)
- The Jealous Wife (1847)
- Louis the Fourteenth and the Court of France in the Seventeenth Century (1847)
- The Rival Beauties (1848)
- Court and Reign of Francis the First, King of France (1849)
- Flies in Amber (1850)
- The Life of Marie de Medicis, Queen of France, Consort of Henri IV, and Regent of the Kingdom Under Louis XIII (1852)
- Reginald Lyle (1854)
- Lady Arabella, or The Adventures of a Doll (1856)
- Abroad and at Home: Tales Here and There (1857)
- Pilgrimages in Paris (1857)
- Thousand and One Days (1857)
- The Poor Relations (1858)
- Episodes of French History during the Consulate and the First Empire (1859)
- The Rich Relation (1862)

== Literature ==
Gülbahar Rabia Altuntașː The Material Culture in the Istanbul Houses Through the Eyes of British Traveler Julia Pardoe (d. 1862). Master of Arts Thesis, Institute of Social Sciences, Sabancı University 2017 (pdf)
