= Mahmud II =

Sultan of the Ottoman Empire from 1808 to 1839

- Custodian of the Two Holy Mosques; Sultan of the two lands, Khan of the two seas
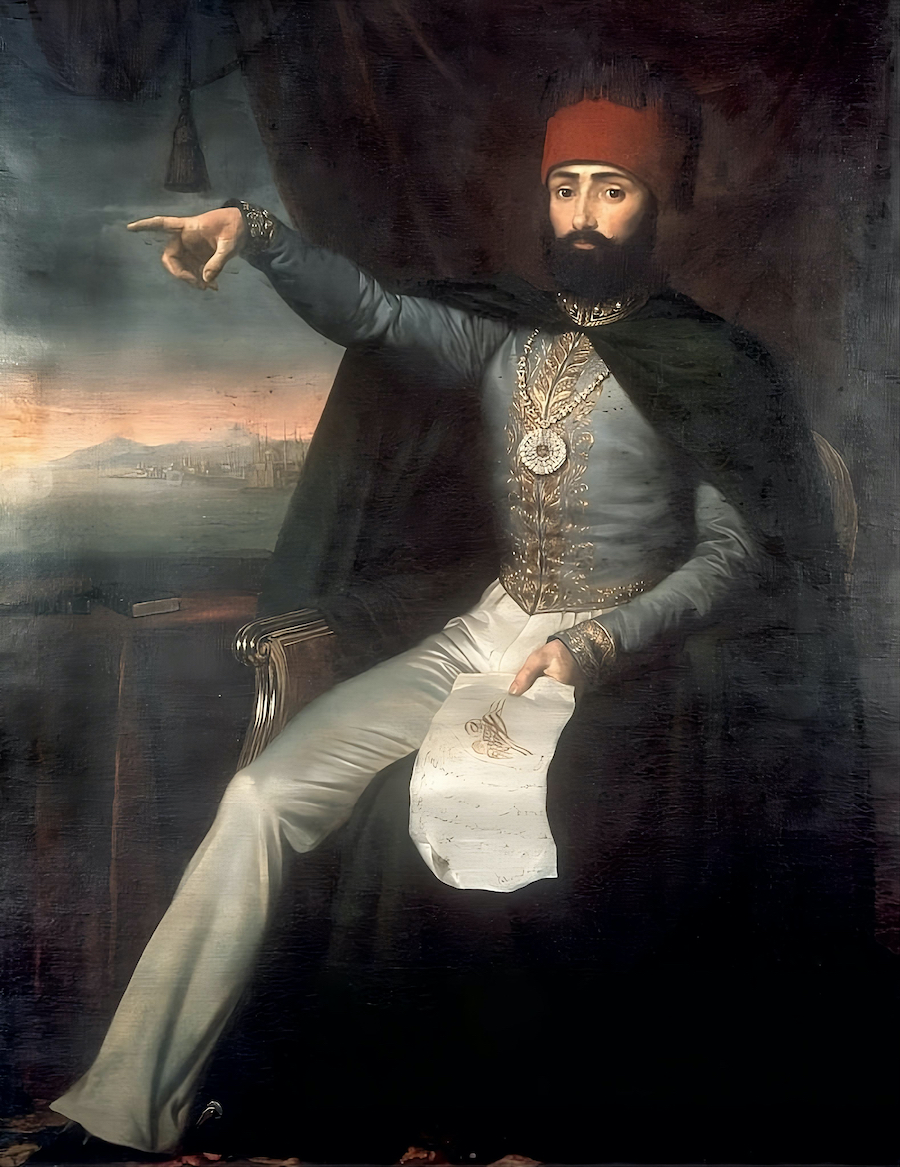

Sultan of the Ottoman Empire (Padishah)
- Reign: 28 July 1808 – 1 July 1839
- Predecessor: Mustafa IV
- Successor: Abdülmecid I

Ottoman Caliph (Amir al-Mu'minin)
- Predecessor: Mustafa IV
- Successor: Abdülmecid I
- Born: 20 July 1784; Topkapı Palace, Istanbul, Ottoman Empire
- Died: 1 July 1839 (aged 54); Istanbul, Ottoman Empire
- Burial: Tomb of Sultan Mahmud II, Fatih, Istanbul, Turkey
- Consorts: Nevfidan Kadın; Hoşyar Kadın; Aşubcan Kadın; Bezmiâlem Kadın; Pertevniyal Kadın; Others
- Issue Among others: Saliha Sultan; Mihrimah Sultan; Abdülmecid I; Atiye Sultan; Adile Sultan; Abdulaziz I
Names
- Mahmud Han bin Abdülhamid
- Dynasty: Ottoman
- Father: Abdul Hamid I
- Mother: Nakşidil Sultan
- Religion: Sunni Islam
- Tughra

Mahmud II (Ottoman Turkish: محمود ثانى Maḥmûd-u s̠ânî; Turkish: II. Mahmud; 20 July 1785 – 1 July 1839) was the sultan of the Ottoman Empire from 1808 until his death in 1839. Often described as the "Peter the Great of Turkey", Mahmud instituted extensive administrative, military, and fiscal reforms. His disbandment of the conservative Janissary Corps removed a major obstacle to his and his successors' reforms in the Empire, creating the foundations of the subsequent Tanzimat era. Mahmud's reign was also marked by further Ottoman military defeats and loss of territory as a result of nationalist uprisings and European intervention.

Mahmud ascended the throne following an 1808 coup that deposed his half-brother Mustafa IV. Early in his reign, the Ottoman Empire ceded Bessarabia to Russia at the end of the 1806–1812 Russo-Turkish War. Greece waged a successful war of independence that started in 1821 with British, French and Russian support, and Mahmud was forced to recognize the independent Greek state in 1832. The Ottomans lost more territory to Russia after the Russo-Turkish War of 1828–1829, and Ottoman Algeria was conquered by France beginning in 1830.

The Empire's continued decline convinced Mahmud to resume the reforms that were halted before he came to power. In 1826, he orchestrated the Auspicious Incident, in which the Kapıkulu were forcibly abolished and many of its members executed, paving the way for the establishment of a modern Ottoman army and further military reforms. With this modern army, Sultan Mahmud initiated a campaign of recentralization in the empire that saw the submission of derebeys and ayans to central authority. He also made sweeping changes to the bureaucracy to reestablish royal authority and increase administrative efficiency. He oversaw a reorganisation of the Ottoman foreign office. In 1838, Mahmud established the Supreme Council of Judicial Ordinances, and the following year, he introduced a Council of Ministers. He died of tuberculosis later that year and was succeeded by his son Abdülmecid I, who would continue to implement his modernization efforts.

== Early life ==
Mahmud II was born on 20 July 1785, in the month of Ramazan. He was the son of Abdul Hamid I and his Seventh consort Nakşidil Kadin. He was the youngest son of his father, and the second child of his mother, he had an elder brother, Şehzade Seyfullah Murad, two years older than him, and a younger sister, Saliha Sultan, one year younger than him, both dead in infancy. According to tradition, he was confined in the Kafes after the death of his father.

He was a member of the Mevlevi Order.

== Accession ==
In 1808, Mahmud II's predecessor and half-brother, Mustafa IV, ordered his execution along with his cousin, the deposed Sultan Selim III, to defuse any rebellion. Selim III was killed, but Mahmud was safely kept hidden by his mother and was placed on the throne after the rebels deposed Mustafa IV. The leader of this rebellion, Alemdar Mustafa Pasha, later became Mahmud II's vizier.

There are many stories surrounding the circumstances of his attempted murder. A version by the 19th-century Ottoman historian Ahmed Cevdet Pasha gives the following account: one of his slaves, a Georgian girl named Cevri, gathered ashes when she heard the commotion in the palace surrounding the murder of Selim III. When the assassins approached the chambers of the Kafes where Mahmud was staying, she was able to keep them away for a while by throwing ashes into their faces, temporarily blinding them. This allowed Mahmud to escape through a window and climb onto the roof of the harem. He ran to the roof of the Third Court, where other pages saw him and helped him come down with pieces of clothes that were quickly tied together as a ladder. By this time, one of the leaders of the rebellion, Alemdar Mustafa Pasha, arrived with his armed men, and upon seeing the dead body of Selim III, proclaimed Mahmud the padishah. The slave girl Cevri Kalfa was awarded for her bravery and loyalty and appointed as haznedar usta, chief treasurer of the Imperial Harem, which was the second most important position in the hierarchy. A plain stone staircase at the Altınyol or "Golden Way" of the Ottoman Imperial Harem is called the Staircase of Cevri Kalfa, since the events happened around there and are associated with her.

Some of the Janissaries who brought Mahmud to power considered other candidates to put on the throne. Other candidates included Esma Sultan, the head of the Mevlevi Order in Konya, or a prince from the Giray dynasty of the former Crimean Khanate.

== Reign ==
The vizier took the initiative in resuming reforms that had been terminated by the conservative coup d'état of 1807 that had brought Mustafa IV to power. However, he was killed during a rebellion in 1808, and Mahmud II temporarily abandoned the reforms. Mahmud II's later reformation efforts would be much more successful.

=== Russo-Turkish War of 1806–12 ===
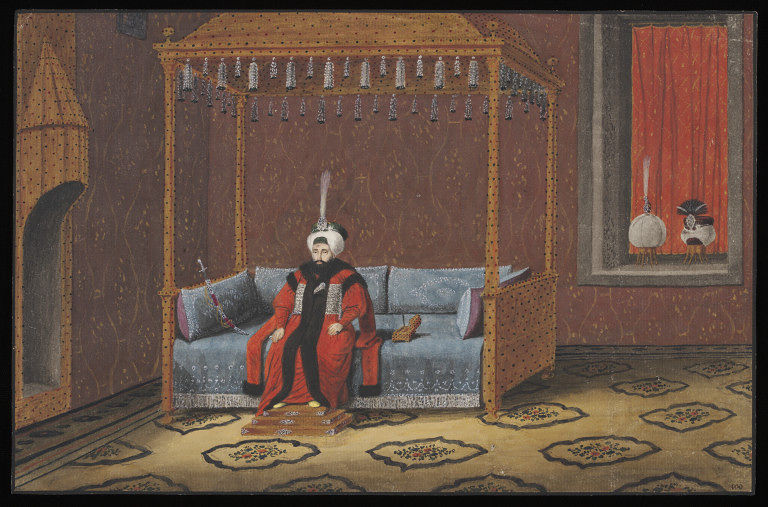
Mahmud II enthroned, c. 1809

After Mahmud II became sultan, Turkish border wars with the Russians continued. In 1810, the Russians surrounded the Silistre fortress for the second time. When Emperor Napoleon I of France declared war on Russia in 1811, Russian pressure on the Ottoman border diminished, a relief to Mahmud. By this time, Napoleon was about to embark on his invasion of Russia. He also invited the Ottomans to join his march on Russia. However, Napoleon, who had invaded all of Europe except the United Kingdom and the Ottoman Empire, could not be trusted and accepted as an ally; Mahmud rejected the offer. The Bucharest Agreement was reached with the Russians on 28 May 1812. According to the Treaty of Bucharest (1812), the Ottoman Empire ceded the eastern half of Moldavia to Russia (which renamed the territory as Bessarabia). However, it had committed to protecting that region. Russia became a new power in the lower Danube, and had an economically, diplomatically, and militarily profitable frontier. In Transcaucasia, the Ottoman Empire regained nearly all it had lost in the east: Poti, Anapa and Akhalkalaki. Russia retained Sukhum-Kale on the Abkhazian coast. In return, the Sultan accepted the Russian annexation of the Kingdom of Imereti in 1810. The treaty was approved by Emperor Alexander I of Russia on 11 June, some 13 days before Napoleon's invasion began. The Russian commanders were able to retrieve many of their soldiers from the Balkans and return them to the western areas of the empire before Napoleon's expected attack.

=== The Wahhabi War ===
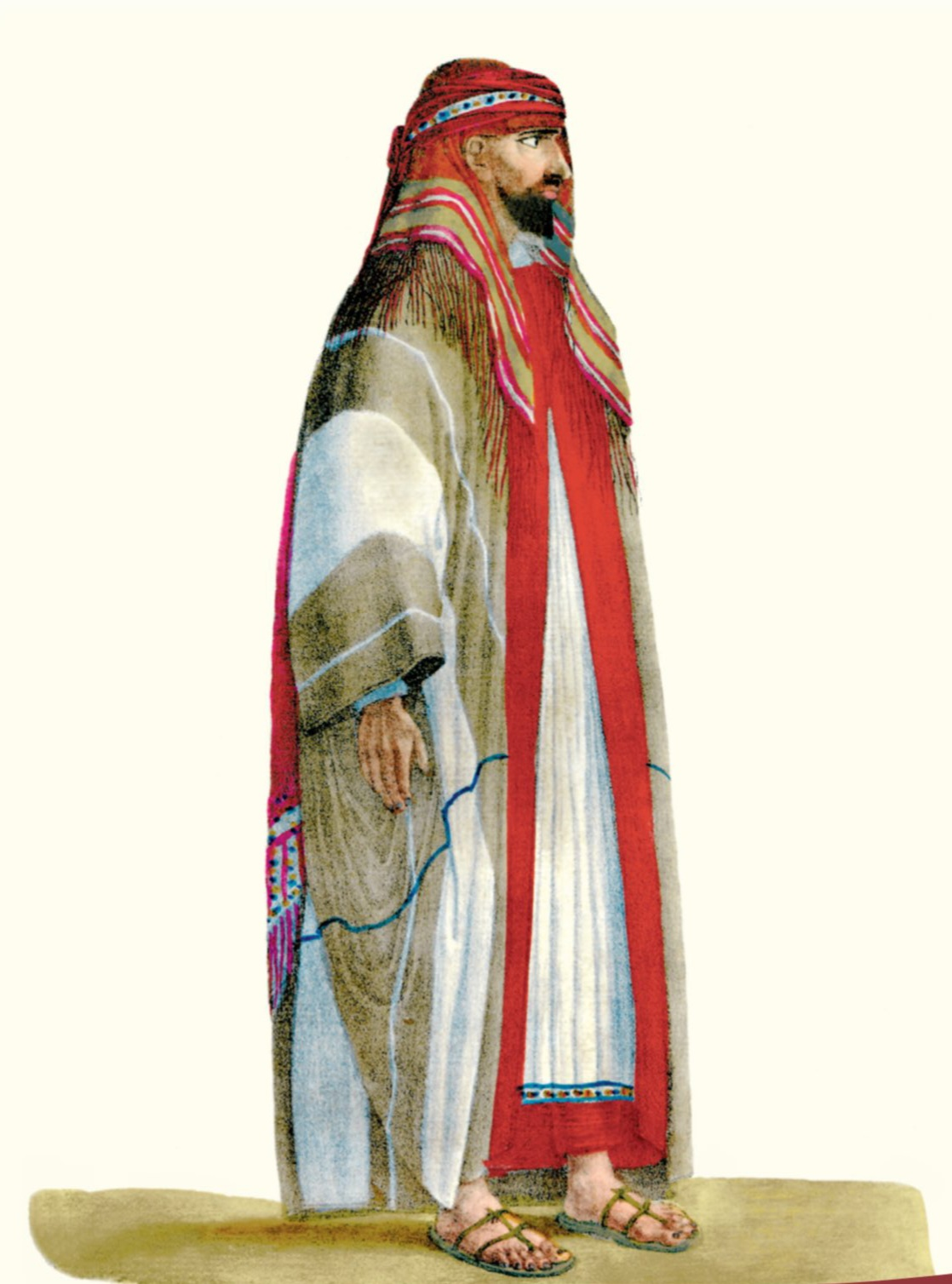
Abdullah bin Saud Al Saud

During the early years of Mahmud II's reign, his governor of Egypt, Muhammad Ali, successfully waged the Wahhabi war at his command. He reconquered Western Arabia (Hejaz) and its holy cities of Medina (1812) and Mecca (1813) from the Emirate of Diriyah, which later became known as the First Saudi state.

Diriyah's Emir Abdullah bin Saud Al Saud had barred Muslims from the Ottoman Empire from entering the holy shrines of Mecca and Medina; his followers also desecrated the tombs of Ali, Hassan ibn Ali and Husayn ibn Ali. Emir Abdullah and two Wahhabi Imams were publicly beheaded for their crimes against the holy cities and mosques in 1819 after they lost the war.

=== Greek War of Independence ===
The stylized signature of Sultan Mahmud II of the Ottoman Empire was written in Islamic calligraphy. It reads "Mahmud Khan son of Abdulhamid is forever victorious".

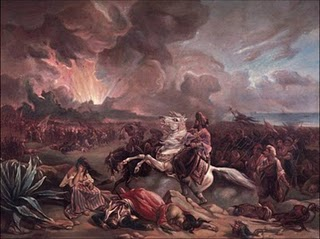
Ibrahim Pasha of Egypt attacks Missolonghi

His reign also marked the first breakaway from the Ottoman Empire, with Greece declaring independence following a rebellion that started in 1821. In the wake of continued unrest, he had ecumenical patriarch Gregory V executed on Easter 1821 for his inability to stem the uprising. During the Battle of Erzurum (1821), part of the Ottoman–Persian War (1821–1823), Mahmud II's superior force was routed by Abbas Mirza, resulting in a Qajar Persian victory which got confirmed in the Treaties of Erzurum. Several years later, in 1827, the combined British, French and Russian navies defeated the Ottoman Navy at the Battle of Navarino; in the aftermath, the Ottoman Empire was forced to recognize Greece with the Treaty of Constantinople in July 1832. This event, together with the French conquest of Algeria, an Ottoman province (see Ottoman Algeria) in 1830, marked the beginning of the gradual break-up of the Ottoman Empire. Non-Turkish ethnic groups residing in the empire's territories, particularly in Europe, initiated their own independence movements.

=== The Auspicious Incident ===
One of Mahmud II's most notable acts during his reign was the destruction of the Janissary corps in June 1826. He accomplished this with careful calculation using his recently reformed wing of the military intended to replace the Janissaries. When the Janissaries mounted a demonstration against Mahmud II's proposed military reforms, he had their barracks fired upon, effectively crushing the formerly elite Ottoman troops. He burned Belgrad Forest outside Istanbul to incinerate any remnants. This permitted the establishment of a European-style conscript army, recruited mainly from Turkish speakers from both Rumelia and Anatolia. Mahmud was also responsible for the subjugation of the Iraqi Mamluks by Ali Ridha Pasha in 1831. He ordered the execution of the renowned Albanian Ali Pasha of Yanina. Following the suppression of the Bosnian uprising, he sent his Grand Vizier to execute the Bosniak military commander Husein Gradaščević and dissolve the Bosnia Eyalet.

=== Russo-Turkish War of 1828–29 ===
Another Russo-Turkish War (1828-29) broke out during Mahmud II's reign and was fought without janissaries. Marshal von Diebitsch was armed (in the words of Baron Moltke) "with the reputation of invincible success". He was to earn the name Sabalskanski (the crosser of the Balkans). Bypassing the Shumla fortress, he forcibly marched his troops over the Balkans, appearing before Adrianople. Sultan Mahmud II maintained control of his forces, unfurled the Black Standard of Muhammad, and declared his intention of taking command of the army personally. Preparing to do so, he appeared, ill-advisedly, not on horseback but in a carriage. In the Divan, British and French ambassadors urged him to sue for peace.

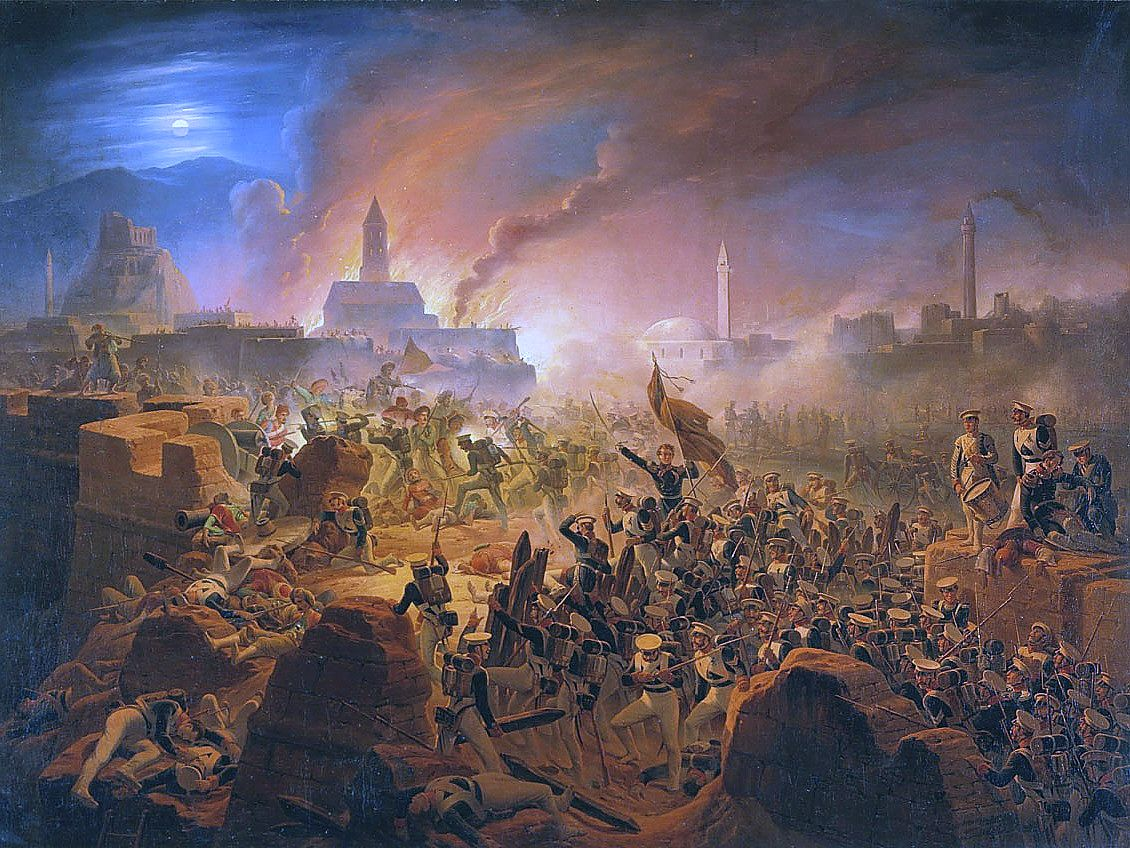
Battle of Akhaltsikhe (1828), by January Suchodolski. Oil on canvas, 1839.

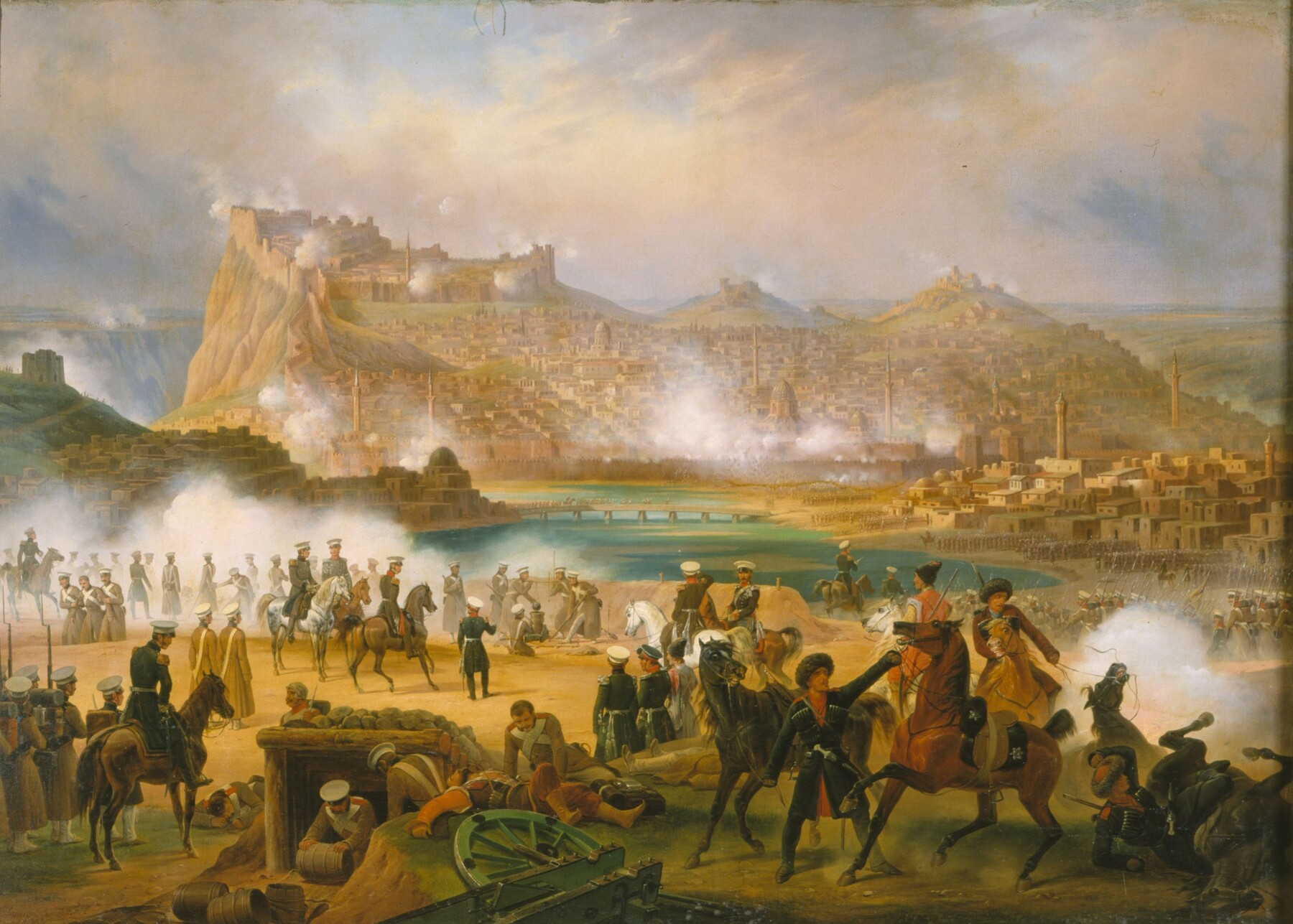
Russian forces reach and cause the Siege of Kars (1828), by January Suchodolski.

=== Egyptian-Ottoman War of 1831–33 ===
The First Egyptian–Ottoman War (1831–1833), broke out with Egypt, led by Muhammad Ali. It concluded with an Egyptian victory, granting Egypt's control over Greater Syria and Adana, effectively establishing Egypt's independence. Key causes included unfulfilled promises by the Ottomans regarding territory compensation for helping in the Greek War of Independence, leading to Egypt's military campaign in October 1831. Notable battles included the capture of Acre, Damascus, and Aleppo, as well as a decisive victory at the Battle of Konya. The conflict prompted Russian intervention for the Ottomans, culminating in the Convention of Kütahya in 1833, where the Ottomans ceded territories to Egypt. Tensions between the two nations remained unresolved, leading to the second war.

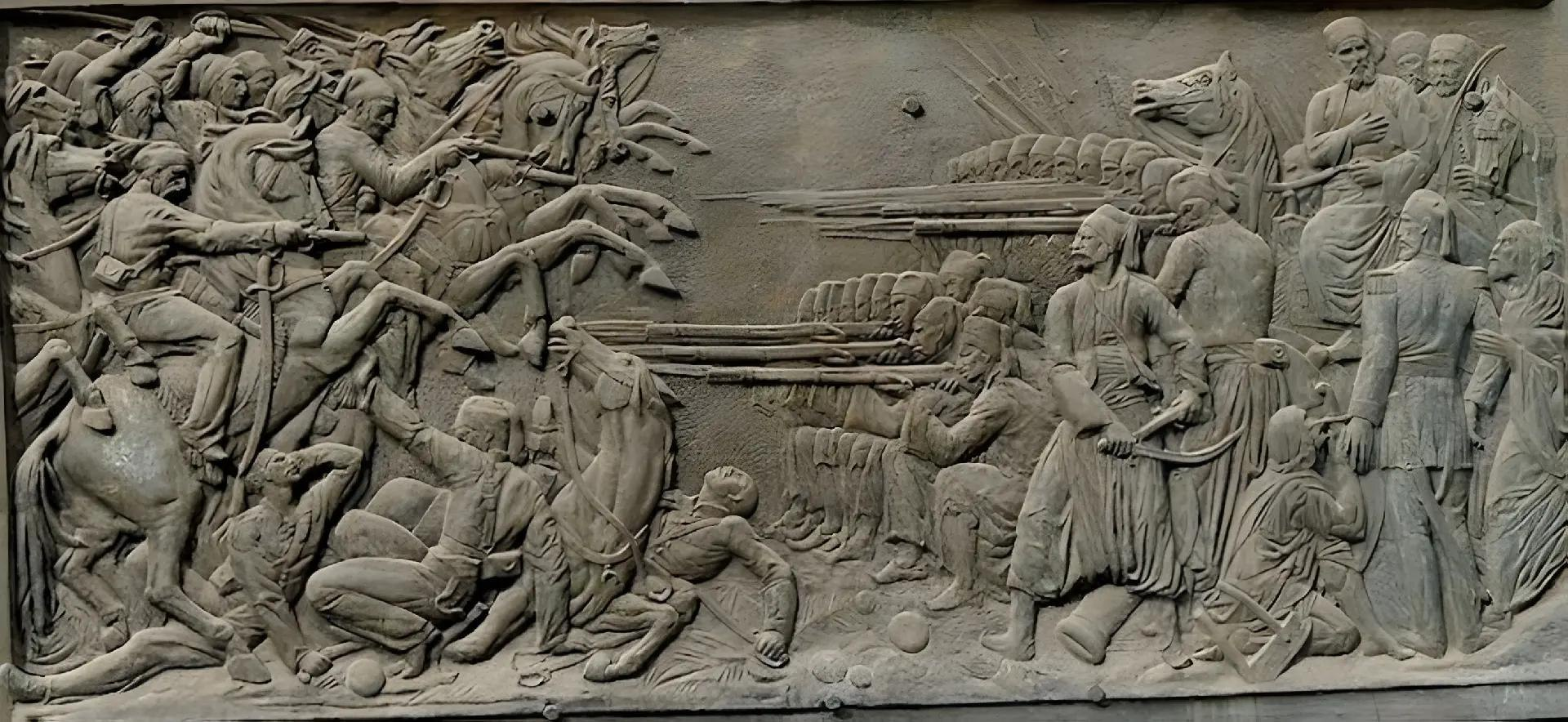
Battle of Konya (1832).

Egyptian Army near Jaffa.

=== Government reforms ===
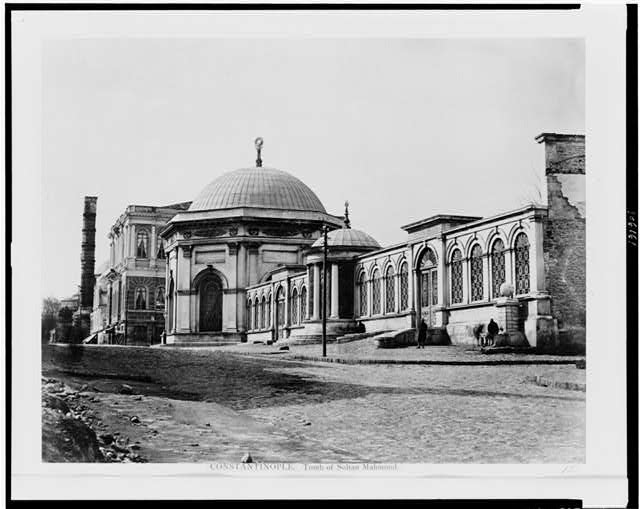
The mausoleum of Sultan Mahmud II during the period of 1860–1890.

In 1839, just before his death, he began preparations for reform, which included introducing a Council of Ministers [Meclis-i Vükela], and the Supreme Council of Judicial Ordinances [Meclis-i Vâlâ-yı Ahkâm-ı Adliye]. The Tanzimat marked the beginning of modernization in the Ottoman Empire and had immediate effects on social and legal aspects of life in the Empire, such as European style clothing, architecture, legislation, institutional organization, and land reform.

He was also concerned for aspects of tradition. He made great efforts to revive the sport of archery. He ordered archery master Mustafa Kani to write a book about the history, construction, and use of Turkish bows, from which comes most of what is now known as Turkish archery.

Mahmud II died of tuberculosis in 1839. His funeral was attended by crowds of people who came to bid the Sultan farewell. His son Abdülmecid I succeeded him and announced an intention of general reorganization or Tanzimat with the Edict of Gülhane.

== Reforms ==
=== Legal reforms ===
Among his reforms are the firmans (edicts) by which he closed the Court of Confiscations and took away much of the power of the Pashas.

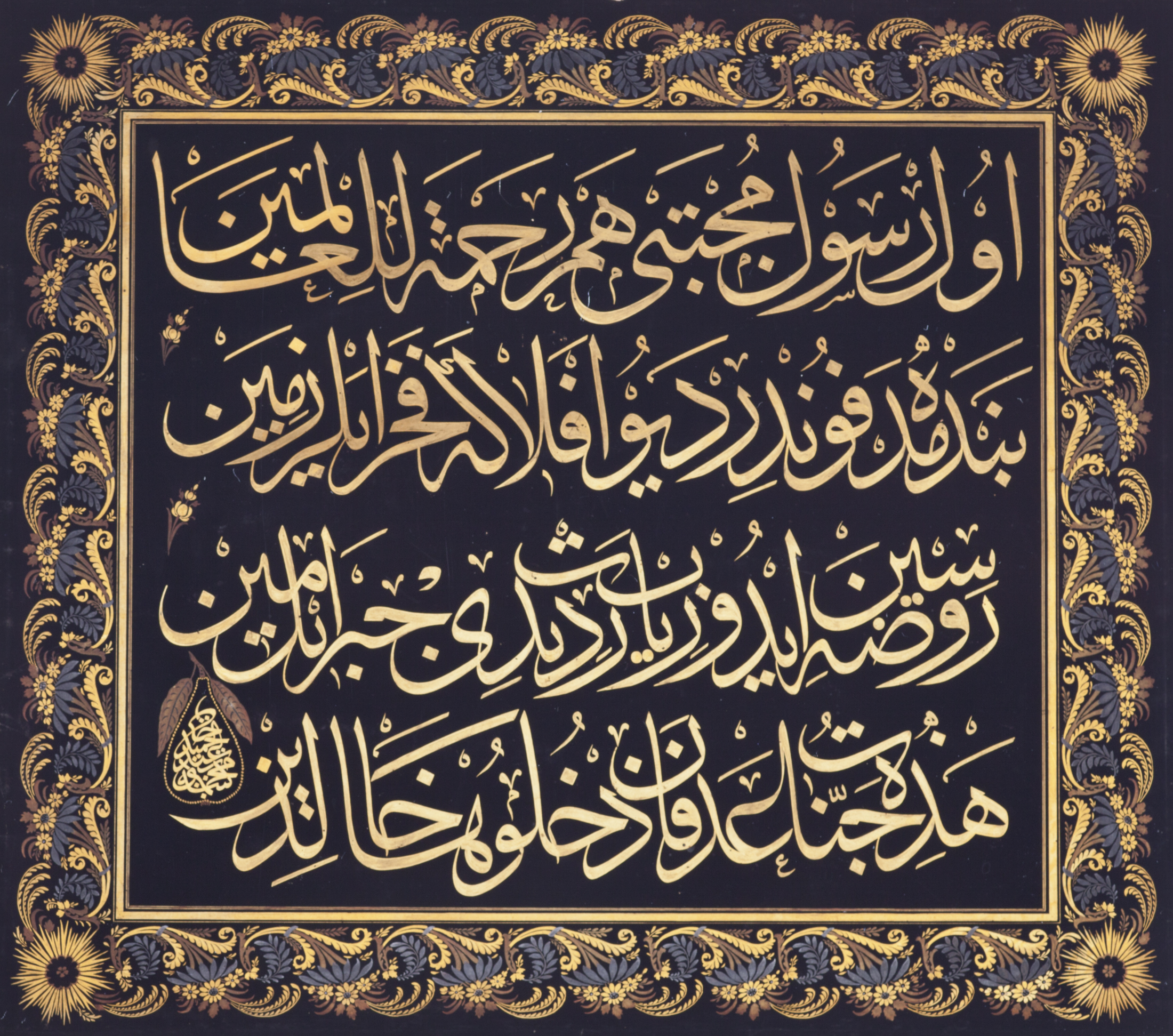
Poem in praise of the prophet Muhammad, calligraphed and signed by Mahmud II

Previous to the first of the firmans, the property of all persons banished or condemned to death was forfeited to the crown; and a sordid motive for acts of cruelty was thus kept in perpetual operation, besides the encouragement of a host of vile delators.

The second firman removed the ancient rights of Turkish governors to doom men to instant death by their will; the Paşas, the Ağas, and other officers, were enjoined that "they should not presume to inflict, themselves, the punishment of death on any man, whether Raya or Turk, unless authorized by a legal sentence pronounced by the Kadı, and regularly signed by the judge." Mahmud also created an appeal system whereby a criminal could appeal to a Kazasker (chief military judge) of Asia or Europe, and finally to the Sultan himself, if the criminal chose to pursue the appeal even further.

About the same time that Mahmud II instituted these changes, he set an example of reform by regularly attending the Divan Imperial Council, rather than abstaining from attendance. The practice of avoiding attending the Divan had been introduced as long ago as the reign of Suleiman the Magnificent. It was considered one of the causes of the Empire's decline by a Turkish historian nearly two centuries before Mahmud II's time.

Mahmud II also addressed some of the worst abuses associated with awqaf (inalienable charitable endowments) by placing their revenues under state administration, the Ministry of Evkaf. However, he did not venture to apply this vast mass of property to the general purposes of the government. His modernizations included the relaxation of much of the restrictions on alcoholic beverages in the Empire, and the sultan himself was known to drink socially with his ministers. By the end of his reign, his reforms mainly had normalized drinking among the upper classes and political figures in the Empire. The financial situation of the Empire was troubling during his reign, and heavy taxes had long oppressed certain social classes. In dealing with the complicated questions that therefore arose, Mahmud II is considered to have demonstrated the spirit of the best of the Köprülü family. A firman dated 22 February 1834 abolished the charges public functionaries had long been accustomed to taking from locals when traversing the provinces. By the same edict, all collection of money, except for the two regular half-yearly periods, was denounced as abuses. "No one is ignorant," said Sultan Mahmud II in this document, "that I am bound to afford support to all my subjects against vexatious proceedings; to endeavour unceasingly to lighten, instead of increasing their burdens, and to ensure peace and tranquility. Therefore, those acts of oppression are at once contrary to the will of God, and to my imperial orders."

The haraç, or capitation-tax, though moderate and exempting those who paid it from military service, had long been made an engine of gross tyranny through the insolence and misconduct of the government collectors. The firman of 1834 abolished the old mode of levying it and ordained that it should be raised by a commission composed of the Kadıs or governors and the Ayans or municipal chiefs of the Rayas in each district. Many other financial improvements were affected. By another important series of measures, the administrative government was simplified and strengthened, and a large number of sinecure offices were abolished. Sultan Mahmud II provided a valuable personal example of good sense and economy, organising the imperial household, suppressing all titles without duties, and all salaried officials without functions.

=== Military reforms ===
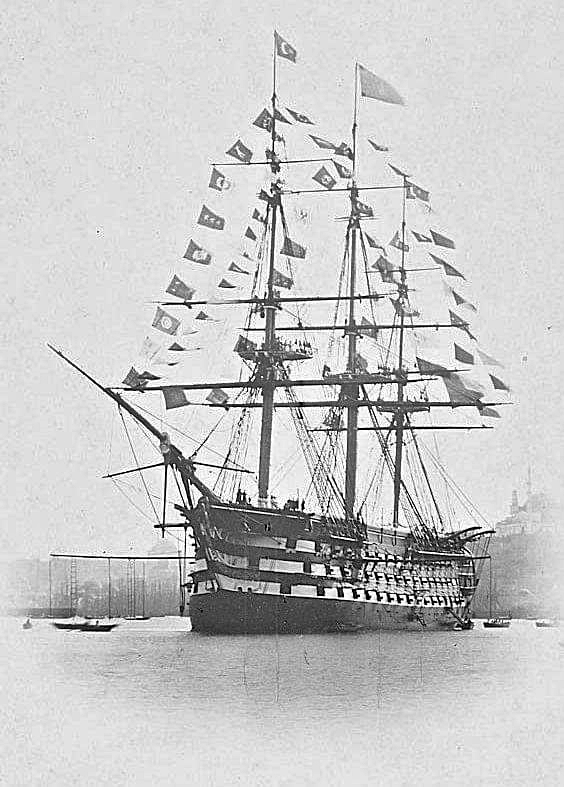
Mahmudiye (1829), built by the Imperial Arsenal on the Golden Horn in Constantinople, was for many years the largest warship in the world. The 201 x 56 kadem, or 76.15 m × 21.22 m (249.8 ft × 69.6 ft) ship of the line was armed with 128 cannons on 3 decks and carried 1,280 sailors on board. She participated in numerous important naval battles, including the Siege of Sevastopol (1854–1855) during the Crimean War.

Mahmud II dealt effectively with the military fiefs, the tımars and ziamets. These had been instituted to furnish the old effective military force, but had long ceased to serve this purpose. By attaching them to the public domains, Mahmud II materially strengthened the resources of the state, and put an end to a host of corruptions. One of the most resolute acts of his ruling was the suppression of the derebeys "valley lords", hereditary local chiefs with the power to nominate their successors in default of male heirs, which, in one of the worst abuses of the Ottoman feudal system, had made themselves petty princes in almost every province of the empire.

The reduction of these insubordinate feudatories was not effected at once, or without severe struggles and frequent rebellions. Mahmud II steadily persevered in this extraordinary measure, and ultimately the island of Cyprus became the only part of the empire in which power that was not emanating from the Sultan was allowed to be retained by derebeys.

One of his most notable achievement was the abolition of the Janissaries through use of military force, execution, exile, and banning of the Bektashi religious order, event known as the Auspicious Incident, in 1826, and the establishment of a modern Ottoman army, named the Asakir-i Mansure-i Muhammediye.

Following the loss of Greece after the Battle of Navarino against the combined British-French-Russian flotilla in 1827, Mahmud II gave top priority to rebuilding a strong Ottoman naval force. The first steamships of the Ottoman Navy were acquired in 1828. In 1829 the world's largest warship for many years, the 201 x 56 kadem (1 kadem = 37.887 cm) or 76.15 m × 21.22 m (249.8 ft × 69.6 ft) ship of the line Mahmudiye, which had 128 cannons on three decks and carried 1280 sailors on board, was built for the Ottoman Navy at the Imperial Arsenal on the Golden Horn (kadem, which translates as "foot", is often misinterpreted as equivalent in length to one imperial foot, hence the wrongly converted dimensions of "201 x 56 ft, or 62 x 17 m" in some sources.)

=== Other reforms ===
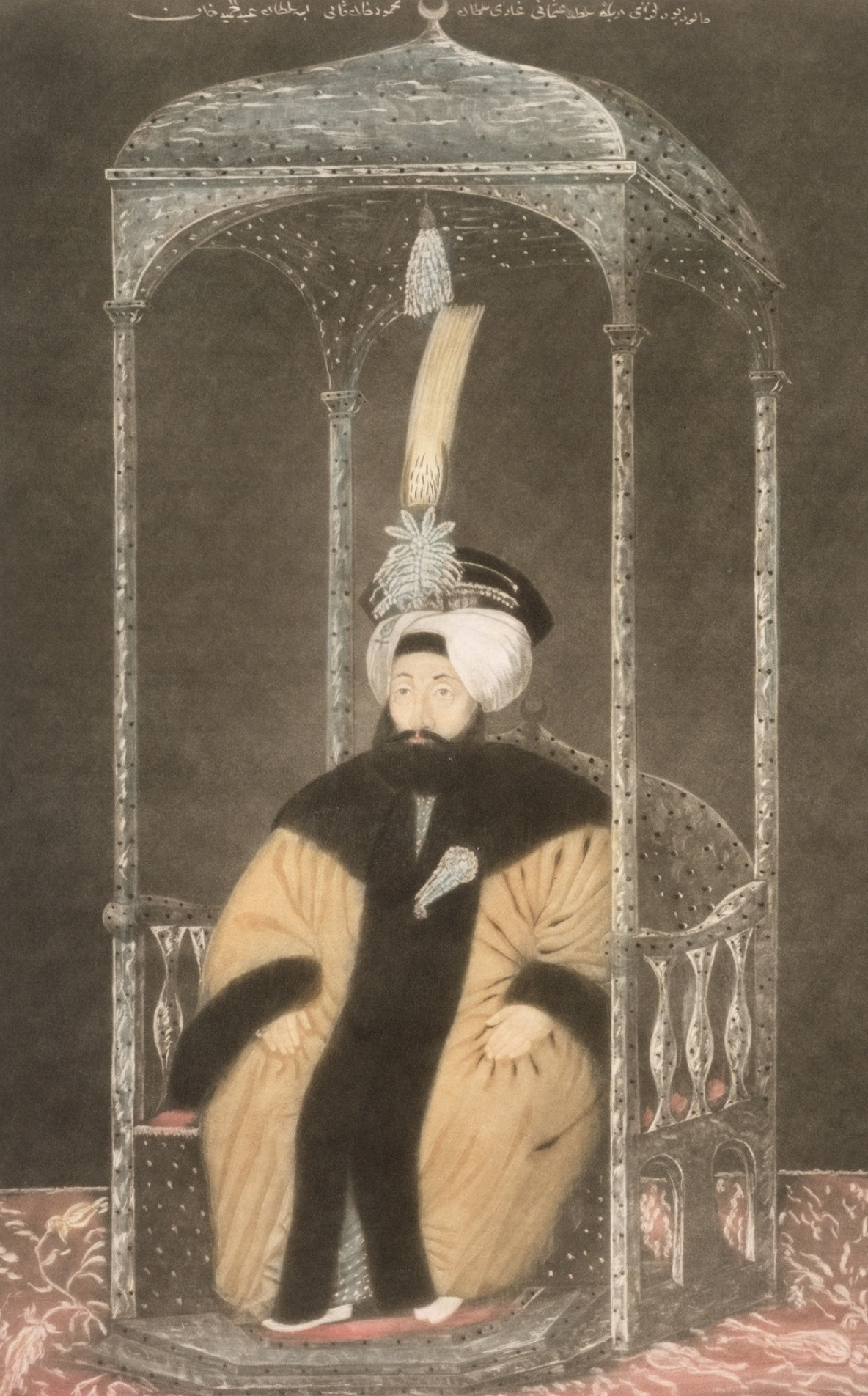
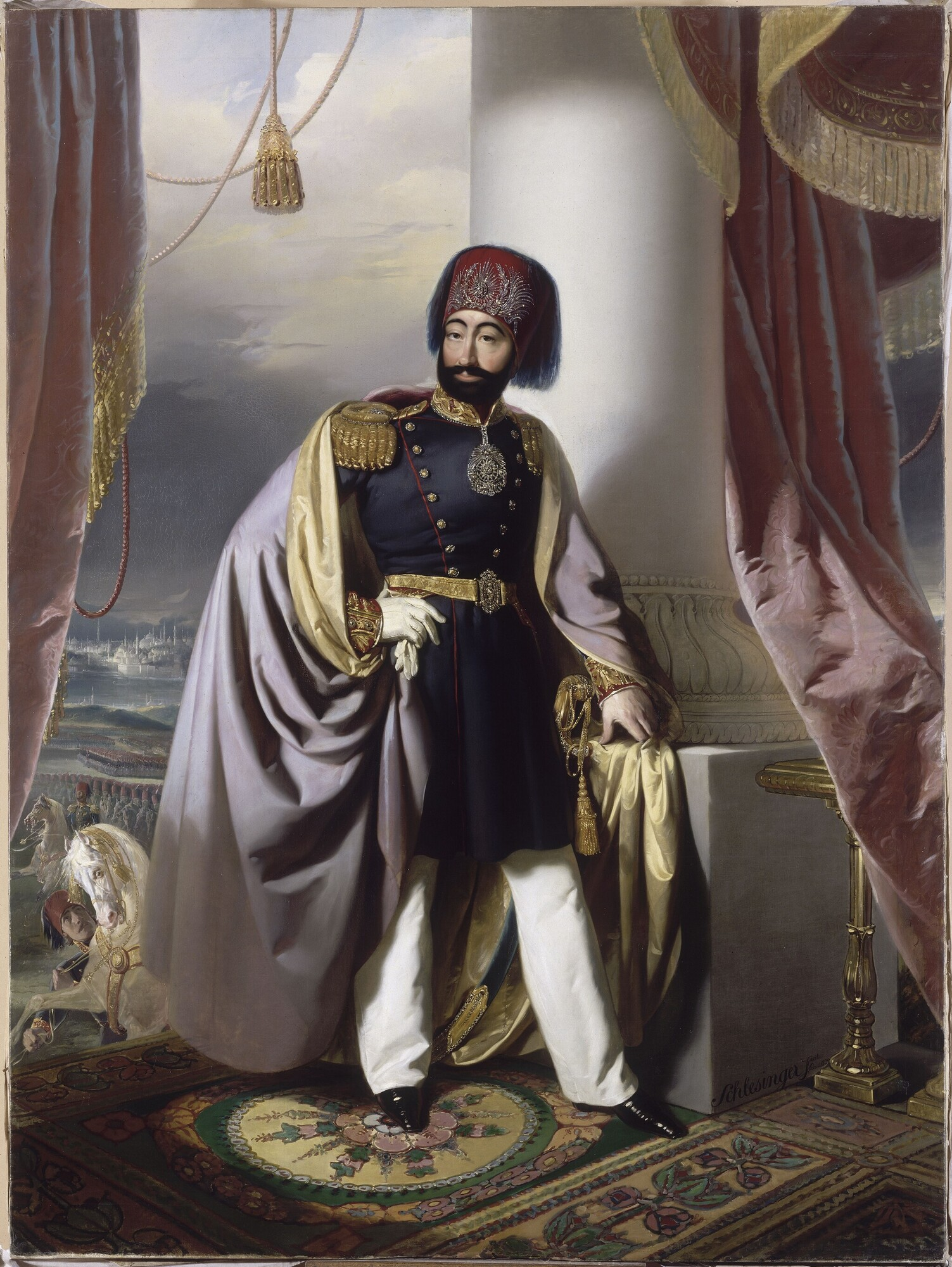
Mahmud II before (left) and after (right) his clothing reform in 1826.

During his reign, Mahmud II also made sweeping reforms of the bureaucracy in order to reestablish royal authority and increase the administrative efficiency of his government. This was accomplished by abolishing old offices, introducing new lines of responsibility, and raised salaries in an attempt to end bribery. In 1838 he founded two institutions aimed towards training government officials. In that same year, Mahmud II established the new reformed Ministry of Finance which served as an official ministry of the previous defterdar position. In 1831, Mahmud II also established an official gazette, Takvim-i Vekayi (Calendar of Events). This was the first newspaper to be published in the Ottoman Turkish language and was required reading for all civil servants.

Clothing was also an essential aspect of Mahmud II's reforms. He began by officially adopting the fez for the military after the Janissary eradication in 1826, which signified a break from the old style of military dress. On top of this, he ordered civilian officials to also adopt a similar, but plain, fez to distinguish them from the military. He planned for the population to adopt this as well, as he desired a homogeneous look for Ottoman society with an 1829 regulatory law. Unlike past Sultanic clothing decrees and those of other societies, Mahmud II wanted all levels of government and civilians to look the same. He faced significant resistance to these measures specifically from religious groups, laborers, and military members because of traditional, religious, and practical reasons. Mahmud II's portraits also give a valuable insight into his clothing mentality, as he switched to a more European military style and fez after 1826.

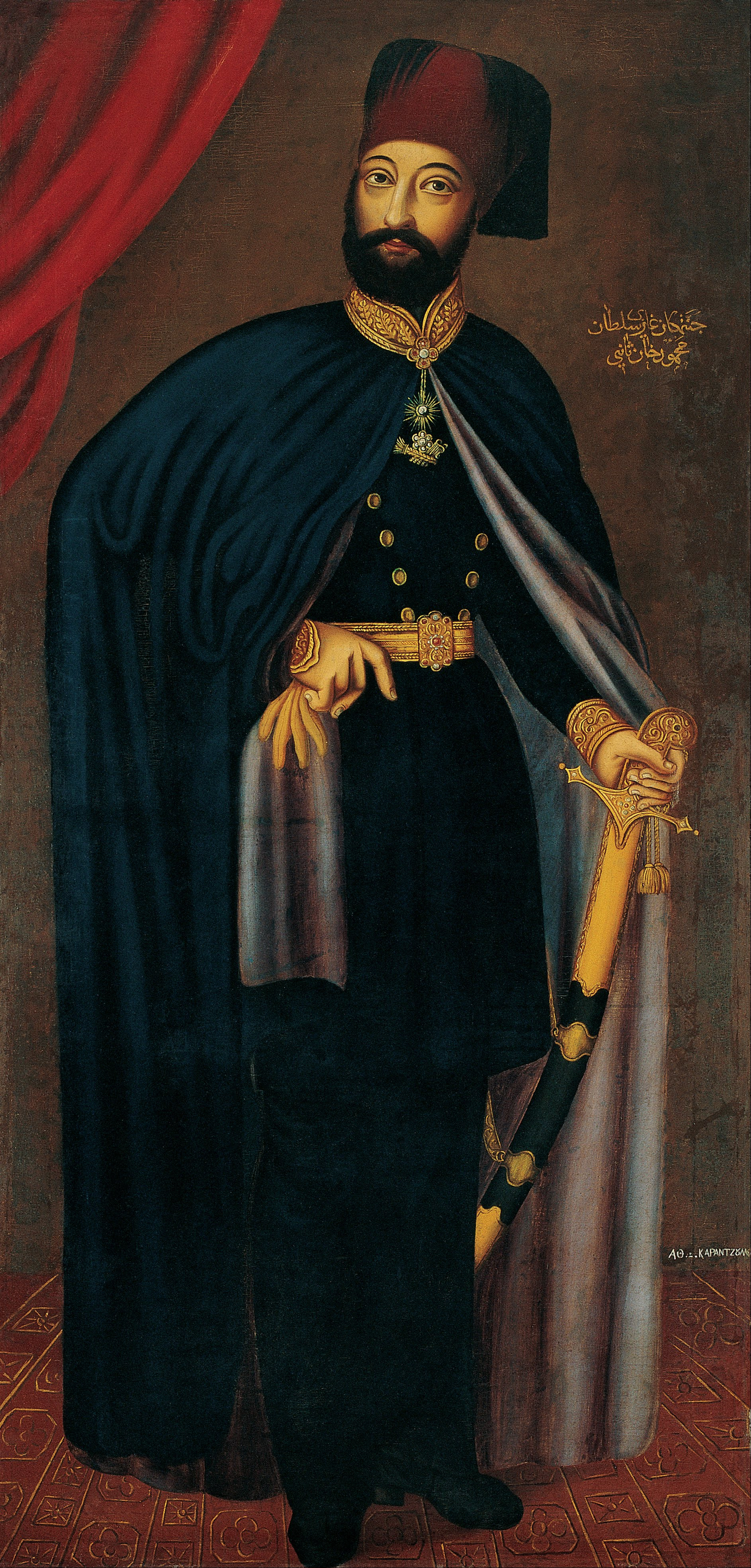
Portrait of Mahmud II by Athanasios Karantzoulas

On top of these reforms, Mahmud II was also critical in the establishment and flourishing of an Ottoman foreign affairs office. While he built upon Selim III's foundational elements of international diplomacy, Mahmud II was the first to create the title of Foreign Minister and Undersecretary in 1836. He placed enormous importance on this position and equated salary and rank with the highest military and civilian positions. Mahmud II also expanded the Language Office and Translation Office, and by 1833 it began to grow in both size and importance. After the reorganization of these offices, he also resumed Selim's efforts to create a system of permanent diplomatic representation in Europe. In 1834, permanent European embassies were established with the first being in Paris. Despite the difficulties that came along with these actions, the expansion of diplomacy increased the transmission of ideas that would have a revolutionary effect on the development of bureaucracy and Ottoman society as a whole especially in regards to modernization.

== Family ==
=== Consorts ===
Mahmud II had at least nineteen consorts:

- Fatma Kadın (? – February 1809). Başkadın (First Consort) for one year before her death.
- Alicenab Kadın (? – before 1839). BaşKadin after Fatma's death. Mother of at least one son.
- Hacıye Pertevpiyale Nevfidan Kadın (4 January 1793 – 27 December 1855). Mahmud's concubine already when he was a prince (conceived their first daughter, Fatma Sultan, born six months after his father acceded to the throne, in this period, thus violating the rules of the harem that forbade the princes to have children until their eventual ascent to the throne), became BaşKadin after Alicenab's death. She was the mother of at least one son and four daughters, and she also raised Adile Sultan when she was orphaned in 1830. Abdülmecid I allowed her to go on pilgrimage to Mecca, which earned her the title Haciye.
- Dilseza Kadın (? – 1816). Second Kadın. Mother of at least two sons. Buried in the mausoleum of the Dolmabahçe Palace.
- Mislinayab Kadın (? – before 1825). Second Kadın. Buried in the Nakşidil Sultan mausoleum.
- Kameri Kadın (? – before 1825). Also called Kamerfer Kadın. Second Kadın. Buried in the Nakşidil Sultan mausoleum.
- Ebrirefar Kadın (? – before 1825). Also called Ebrureftar Kadın. Second Kadın. Buried in the Nakşidil Sultan mausoleum.
- Bezmialem Kadın (1807 – 2 May 1853). Called also Bazimialam Kadın. Georgian, she was educated by Esma Sultan, Mahmud II's sister, and, first to be a consort, she worked in the hamam of her palace. Third Kadın and then Second Kadin from 1832. Mother and Valide Sultan of Abdülmecid I.
- Aşubcan Kadın (1793 – 10 June 1870). Mother of at least three daughters. Fiveth Kadın in 1811 and then Second.
- Vuslat Kadın (? – May 1831). Third Kadın.
- Zernigar Kadın (? – 1830). Of Armenian descent, her real name was Maryam. Educated by Esma Sultan, Mahmud II's half-sister. Mother of a daughter. Fourth Ikbal in 1826, then Seventh Kadın and finally Third Kadın.
- Nurtab Kadın (1810 – 2 January 1886). Fourth Kadın. She was the adoptive mother of Şevkefza Sultan, mother of Murad V. Buried in the Mahmud II mausoleum.
- Hacıye Hoşyar Kadın (? – 1859, Mecca). Mother of two daughters. Third Kadın and then Second. Tall and blonde, she had been educated by Beyhan Sultan, daughter of Mustafa III.
- Pervizfekek Kadın (? – 21 September 1863). Mother of at least three daughters. She was Sixth Kadın in 1824. She was buried in Mahmud II mausoleum.
- Pertevniyal Kadın (1812 – 5 February 1883). Mother of two sons, including Abdülaziz I. Second Ikbal and later Fifth Kadın.
- Hüsnimelek Hanim (1807/1812 – October 1867). Also called Hüsnümelek Hanim. BaşIkbal (First Ikbal). Esma Sultan, the sister of Mahmud II, educated her. He saw her play at a banquet hosted by her sister and asked for it for himself. She was of great musical talent, and she composed a song for the sultan, entitled Hüsnümelek bir peridir/Cümlesinin dilberidir. She did not live in the harem but in a separate wing of the palace. After Mahmud's death she became a dance teacher in the harem of his heir and son Abdülmecid I. Buried in the Mahmud II mausoleum.
- Tiryal Hanim (1810–1883). Third Ikbal. Perhaps the mother of a child, she loved Abdülaziz I as if he were her son. He considered her a second mother, to the extent that during his reign, he ensured she received the same treatment as his own mother, allowing her to reside in the Beylerbeyi Palace and bestow upon her wealth and prestige. Everyone considered Tiryal the second Valide Sultan. Tiriyal donated her villa in Çamlıca to Şehzade Yusuf Izzeddin, Abdülaziz's eldest son, whom she considered her grandson. He built a glass pavilion and fountain in Çamlıca and a second fountain in Üsküdar. She took care of the education of Dilpesend Kadın, who became the consort of Abdülhamid II, grandson of Mahmud II through his son Abdülmecid I. She was buried in the Yeni Cami, in front of the fountain built in her name.
- Lebrizfelek Hanim (1810 – 9 February 1865). Fourth Ikbal. She died in the Dolmabahçe Palace and was buried in the courtyard of the Yeni Cami.
- Verdicenan Hanım.

=== Sons ===
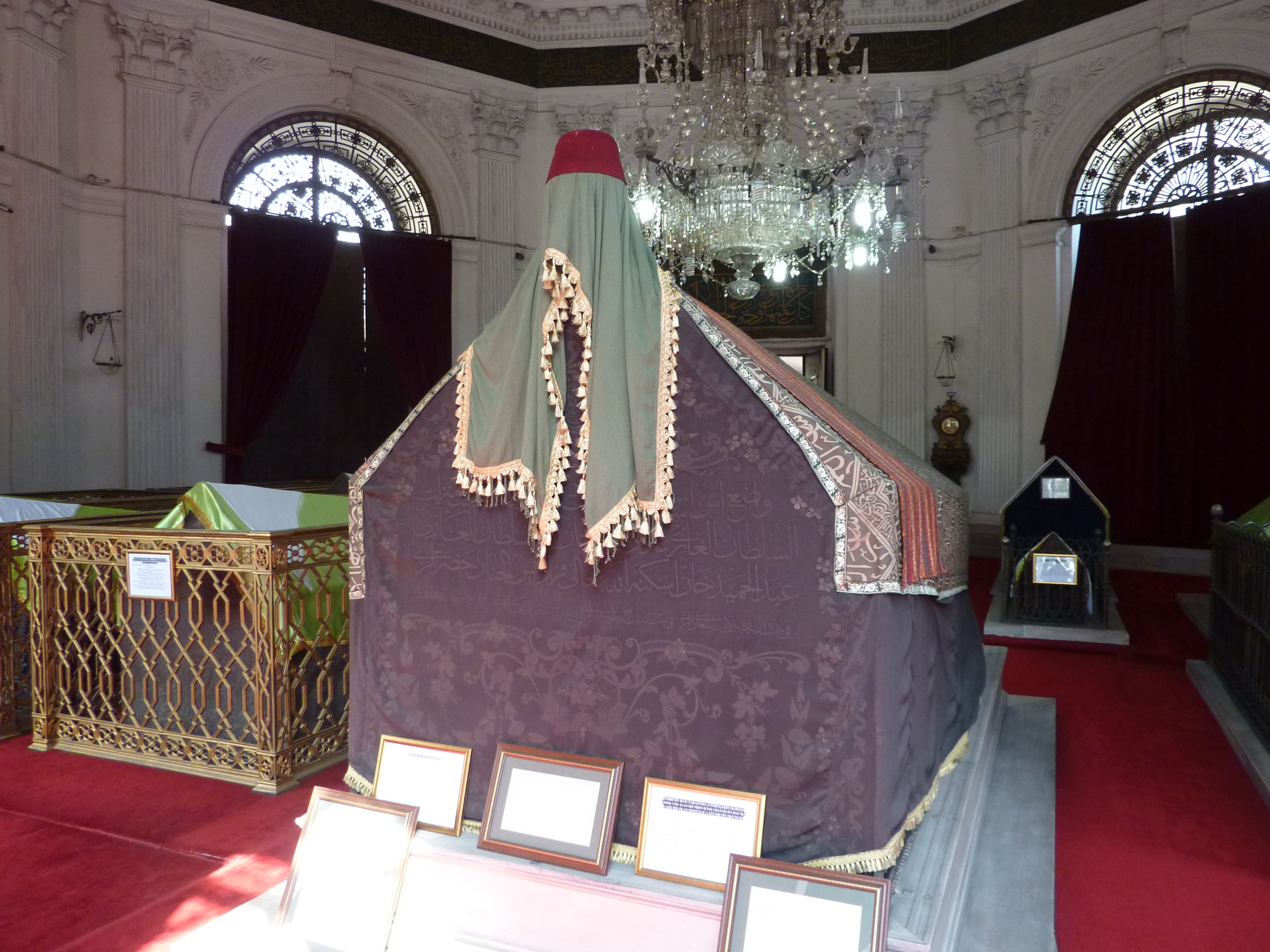
The sarcophagus of Sultan Mahmud II in his burial place

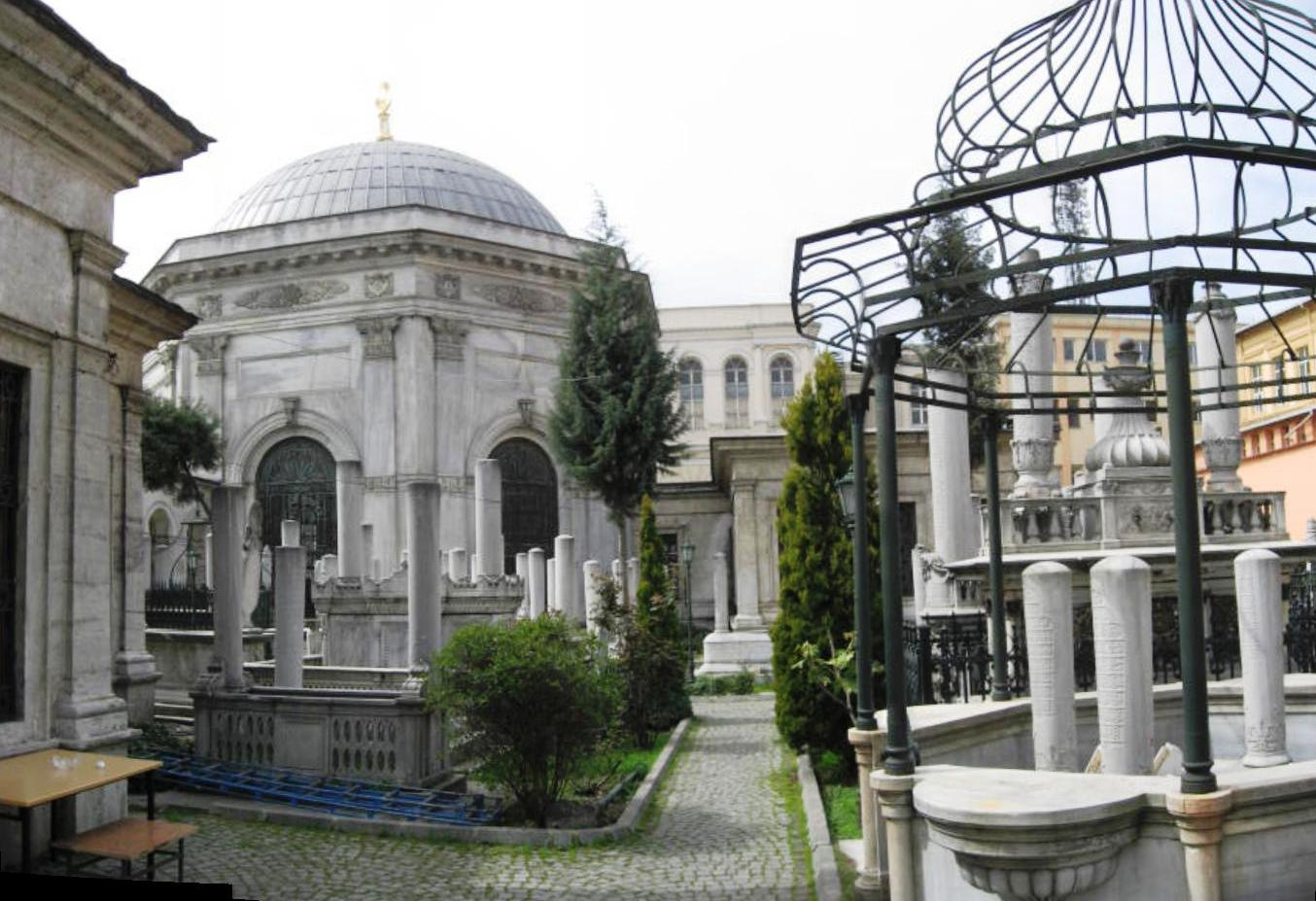
Exterior view of the türbe of Sultan Mahmud II

Mahmud had at least eighteen sons, of which only two lived to adulthood:

- Şehzade Murad (25 December 1811 – 14 July 1812). Buried in the Hamidiye mausoleum.
- Şehzade Bayezid (23 March 1812 – 25 June 1812) – with Dilseza Kadin. Buried in the Hamidiye mausoleum.
- Şehzade Abdülhamid (6 March 1813 – 20 April 1825) – with Alicenab Kadın. Buried in the mausoleum Nakşidil Sultan.
- Şehzade Osman (12 June 1813 – 10 April 1814) – with Nevfidan Kadin. Twin of Emine Sultan. Buried in the Nurosmaniye Mosque.
- Şehzade Ahmed (25 July 1814 – 16 July 1815). Buried in the Nurosmaniye mosque.
- Şehzade Mehmed (26 August 1814 – November 1814) – with Dilseza Kadin. Buried in the Nurosmaniye mosque.
- Şehzade Mehmed (4 August 1816 – August 1816). Buried in the Nurosmaniye mosque.
- Şehzade Süleyman (29 August 1817 – 14 December 1819). Buried in the Nurosmaniye mosque.
- Şehzade Ahmed (13 October 1819 – December 1819). Buried in the Nurosmaniye mosque.
- Şehzade Ahmed (25 December 1819 – January 1820). Buried in the Nurosmaniye mosque.
- Şehzade Abdüllah (1820 – 1820). Buried in the Nurosmaniye mosque.
- Şehzade Mehmed (12 February 1822 – 23 October 1822). Buried in the Nurosmaniye mosque.
- Şehzade Ahmed (6 July 1822 – 9 April 1823). Buried in the Nurosmaniye mosque.
- Abdülmecid I (25 April 1823 – 25 June 1861) – with Bezmialem Kadın. 31st Sultan of the Ottoman Empire. He was the last sultan to be born on Topkapi Palace, after the imperial palace became the Beşiktaş Palace.
- Şehzade Ahmed (5 December 1823 – 1824).
- Şehzade Abdülhamid (18 February 1827 – 1829). Buried in the Nakşidil Sultan mausoleum.
- Abdulaziz (18 February 1830 – 4 June 1876) – with Pertevniyal Kadin. 32nd Sultan of the Ottoman Empire.
- Şehzade Nizameddin (29 December 1833 – March 1838) – with Pertevniyal Kadin or Tiriyal Hanim.

=== Daughters ===
Mahmud II had at least nineteen daughters, but only six survived infancy and only four reached the age of marriage:

- Fatma Sultan (4 February 1809 – 5 August 1809) – with Nevfidan Kadin. Her birth, the first in the imperial dynasty after 19 years and just six months after her father's accession to the throne, caused scandal, as it meant she must have been conceived when Mahmud was still Şehzade and confined to Kafes, which was forbidden at the time. She died of smallpox and was buried in the Nurosmaniye Mosque.
- Ayşe Sultan (5 July 1809 – February 1810) – with Aşubcan Kadin. Buried in the Nurosmaniye mosque.
- Fatma Sultan (30 April 1810 – 7 May 1825) – with Nevfidan Kadin. She died of smallpox and was buried in the mausoleum Nakşidil Sultan.
- Saliha Sultan (16 June 1811 – 5 February 1843) – with Aşubcan Kadin. She married once and had two sons and a daughter.
- Şah Sultan (22 May 1812 – September 1814) – with Aşubcan Kadin. Buried in the Nurosmaniye mosque.
- Mihrimah Sultan (10 June 1812 – 3 July 1838) – with Hoşyar Kadın. She married once and had a son.
- Emine Sultan (12 June 1813 – July 1814) – with Nevfidan Kadin. Twin sister of Şehzade Osman. Buried in the Nurosmaniye mosque.
- Atiye Sultan (2 January 1824 – 11 August 1850) – with Pervizfelek Kadın. She married once and had two daughters.
- Şah Sultan (14 October 1814 – 13 April 1817) – her mother was the Fourth Kadın. Buried in the Nurosmaniye mosque.
- Emine Sultan (7 January 1815 – 24 September 1816) – with Nevfidan Kadin. She died in Beylerbeyi Palace in a fire. She was buried in the Yahya Efendi mausoleum.
- Zeynep Sultan (18 April 1815 – February 1816) – with Hoşyar Kadın. Buried in the Nurosmaniye mosque.
- Hamide Sultan (14 July 1817 – July 1817).
- Cemile Sultan (1818 – 1818).
- Hamide Sultan (4 July 1818 – 15 February 1819). Buried in the Nurosmaniye mosque.
- Münire Sultan (16 October 1824 – 23 May 1825). She died of smallpox and was buried in the Nakşidil Sultan mausoleum.
- Hatice Sultan (6 September 1825 – 19 December 1842) – Pervizfelek Kadın. She died in the Beşiktaş Palace.
- Adile Sultan (23 May 1826 – 12 February 1899) – with Zernigar Kadın. After being orphaned on 1830, she was raised by Navfidan Kadın. She married once and had a son and three daughters.
- Fatma Sultan (20 July 1828 – 2 February 1839) – with Pervizfelek Kadın. Buried in the Nakşidil Sultan mausoleum.
- Hayriye Sultan (22 March 1831 – 15 February 1833). She was buried in the Nakşidil Sultan mausoleum.

== In fiction ==
The 2006 historical detective novel The Janissary Tree, by Jason Goodwin, is set in 1836 Constantinople, with Mahmud II's modernising reforms (and conservative opposition to them) forming the background of the plot. The Sultan himself and his mother appear in several scenes.

The 1989 film Intimate Power, also known as The Favorite, is adapted from a historical fiction novel by Prince Michael of Greece. It portrays a legend about Aimée du Buc de Rivéry as a young captured French girl who, after spending years in an Ottoman harem, outlives two Sultans and protects Mahmud as his surrogate mother. Mahmud is a minor role in the film but is portrayed as both an adult and a child. The film concludes with a variation of his dramatic succession.

== See also ==
- Atçalı Kel Mehmet Efe
- Sened-i İttifak
- Tomb of Mahmud II

== Bibliography ==
- Allen, William Edward David; Muratoff, Paul (2010). Caucasian Battlefields: A History of the Wars on the Turco-Caucasian Border, 1828–1921. Cambridge University Press. ISBN 978-1108013352.
- Coene, Frederik (2010). The Caucasus – An Introduction. Routledge. ISBN 978-0415666831.
- Uluçay, Mustafa Çağatay (2011). Padişahların kadınları ve kızları. Ankara: Ötüken. ISBN 978-9-754-37840-5.
- Kaya, Bayram Ali; Küçük, Sezai (2011). Defter-i Dervişan (Yenikapı Mevlevihanesi Günlükleri). Zeytinburnu Belediyesi. ISBN 978-9-757-32133-0.

Mahmud II House of Osman Born: 20 July 1785 Died: 1 July 1839
Regnal titles
Preceded by Mustafa IV	Sultan of the Ottoman Empire; 15 November 1808 – 1 July 1839	Succeeded by Abdulmejid I
Sunni Islam titles
Preceded by Mustafa IV	Caliph of the Ottoman Caliphate; 15 November 1808 – 1 July 1839	Succeeded by Abdülmecid I
