= Şehzade Mehmed Şerafeddin =

Ottoman prince (1904–1966)

- Born: 19 May 1904; Feriye Palace, Constantinople, Ottoman Empire (now Istanbul, Turkey)
- Died: c. 1966 (aged 61–62); Beirut, Lebanon
- Burial: Cemetery of the Sulaymaniyya Takiyya, Damascus, Syria
- Spouse: Şükriye Sultan (m. 1923; div. 1927) Semahat Hanım (m. 1928; div. 1956)
- Issue: Bezmiâlem Mübeccel Sultan
Names
- Turkish: Şehzade Mehmed Şerafeddin; Ottoman Turkish: شهزاده محمد شرف الدین
- Dynasty: Ottoman
- Father: Şehzade Selim Süleyman
- Mother: Ayşe Tarzıter Hanım
- Religion: Sunni Islam
- Military career
- Allegiance: Ottoman Empire
- Branch: Ottoman Army
- Service years: c. 1918–1922 (active service)
- Rank: See list

Şehzade Mehmed Şerafeddin Efendi (Ottoman Turkish: شهزادہ محمد شرف الدین; 19 May 1904 – c. 1966) was an Ottoman prince, the son of Şehzade Selim Süleyman and grandson of Sultan Abdulmejid I.

== Early life ==
Şehzade Mehmed Şerafeddin was born on 19 May 1904 in the Feriye Palace. His father was Şehzade Selim Süleyman, son of Sultan Abdulmejid I and Serfiraz Hanım, and his mother was Ayşe Tarzıter Hanım, an Abkhazian from the Barğan-Ipa family. He had one full sister, Emine Naciye Sultan, seven years older than him, and an elder half-brother, Şehzade Mehmed Abdülhalim.

== Education and career ==
Şerafeddin began his education in the Ihlamur Pavilion. His brother-in-law, Enver Pasha decided that the young princes should receive a military education, and for this purpose he had allocated the Ihlamur Pavilion as the Princes' School. It became compulsory for all princes below the age of fifteen to attend this school. Besides their military training, they were taught literature, history, religion, mathematics, and geometry.

In1715, Şerafeddin attended, along with Şehzade Ömer Faruk, son of Abdulmejid II, the Theresian Military Academy, a school created by the Empress Maria Theresa in Vienna. Enver Pasha thought they should not be trained in the land of the waltz as "ballroom officers," but instead should proceed to Potsdam, where they would receive a Prussian education and become strong, reliable officers. So they were transferred from Vienna to Potsdam Military Academy in Prussia.

By 1918, he was serving in the Ottoman Army as a second lieutenant in the infantry.

== Personal life ==
Şerafeddin married twice and had one daughter. His first wife was Şükriye Sultan, daughter of the crown prince Şehzade Yusuf Izzeddin and Leman Hanım. She was born on 24 February 1906 in her father's villa in Çamlıca. They married on 14 November 1923 in the Nişantaşı Villa. They divorced in 1927. She then married twice, and died on 1 April 1972.

His second wife was Semahet Hanım. She was born on 8 October 1911 in Beirut, Lebanon. They married in 1928. She gave birth to the couple's only daughter Bezmiâlem Mübeccel Sultan on 10 May 1929. They divorced in 1956. She died in 1973.

== Exile and death ==
At the exile of the imperial family in March 1924, Şerafeddin and his family settled firstly in Paris, France, until December 1924. They then went to Cairo, Egypt and finally settled in Beirut, Lebanon, where he died in 1966. He was buried in the cemetery of the Sulaymaniyya Takiyya, Damascus, Syria.

== Honours ==
Styles of Şehzade Mehmed Nizameddin
- Reference style: His Imperial Highness
- Spoken style: Your Imperial Highness

- Order of Osmanieh, 1st Class
- Order of Medjidie, 1st Class
- Liakat War Medal in Silver

=== Military appointments ===
==== Military ranks and appointments ====
- c. 1918: Second Lieutenant in the Infantry, Ottoman Army

== Issue ==
Şehzade Mehmed Şerafeddin had an only daughter:

- Bezmiâlem Mübeccel Sultan (Beirut, 10 May 1929 - Istanbul, 1 July 1993) - with Semahet Hanım. Buried in Zincirlikuyu cemetery. She married Ihlan Baransel (1924 - 24 April 1997) in Istanbul in December 1954 and had a son:
  - Sultanzade Cengiz Baransel (b. 1965). He married Shenay Küçük and has a son:
    - Kaan Baransel (b. 1994)

== Sources ==
- Milanlıoğlu, Neval (2011). Emine Naciye Sultan'ın Hayatı (1896-1957) (Postgraguate Thesis) (in Turkish). Marmara University Institute of Social Sciences.
