= Şehzade Selim Süleyman =

Ottoman prince, son of Abdulmejid I

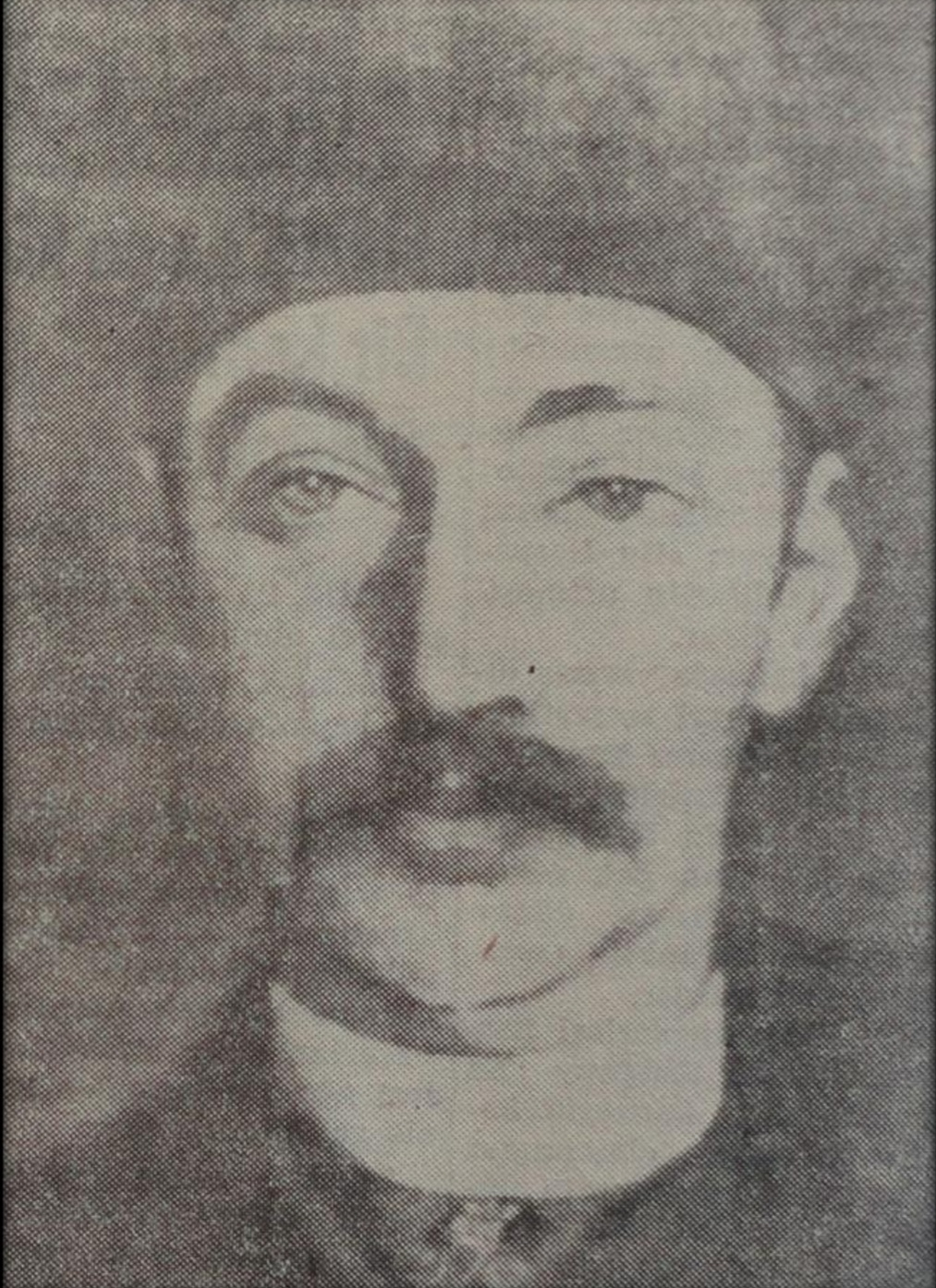
- Born: 25 July 1860; Dolmabahçe Palace, Istanbul, Ottoman Empire (now Istanbul, Turkey)
- Died: 16 July 1909 (aged 48); Bebek Palace, Bebek, Beşiktaş, Istanbul, Ottoman Empire
- Burial: Şehzade Ahmed Kemaleddin Mausoleum, Yahya Efendi Cemetery, Istanbul
- Spouse: Filişan Hanım (m. 1885) Cavidan Hanım (m. 1886, divorced) Fatma İkbal Hanım (m. 1893) Tarzıter Hanım (m. 1895) Zatimelek Hanım (m. 1899)
- Issue: Şehzade Mehmed Abdülhalim; Naciye Sultan; Şehzade Mehmed Şerafeddin
Names
- Turkish: Şehzade Selim Süleyman; Ottoman Turkish: شهزاده سلیم سلیمان
- Dynasty: Ottoman
- Father: Abdülmecid I
- Mother: Serfiraz Hanım
- Religion: Sunni Islam

Şehzade Selim Süleyman (Ottoman Turkish: شهزاده سلیم سلیمان; 25 July 1860 – 16 July 1909) was an Ottoman prince, the son of Sultan Abdulmejid I, and one of his consorts Serfiraz Hanım.

== Early life ==
Şehzade Selim Süleyman was born on 25 July 1860 in the Dolmabahçe Palace. His father was Sultan Abdulmejid I, and his mother was Serfiraz Hanım, daughter of Lah Osman Bey. He was the third child of his mother. He had a brother, Şehzade Osman Seyfeddin, eight years elder than him, and a sister Bedihe Sultan (or Bedia Sultan), two years elder than him, both of his siblings died when they were young. When he was eleven months old his father died.

Süleyman was circumcised in 1870. Other princes who were circumcised along with him included, his half-brother, Şehzade Mehmed Vahideddin, his nephew Şehzade Mehmed Selaheddin, Şehzade Yusuf Izzeddin, Şehzade Mahmud Celaleddin, sons of Sultan Abdulaziz, and Sultanzade Alaeddin Bey, son of Münire Sultan, daughter of Abdulmejid.

== Ali Suavi incident ==
After the deposition of Sultan Murad V on 30 August 1876, their half-brother, Sultan Abdul Hamid II ascended the throne, and Murad and his family were then confined to the Çırağan Palace. On 20 May 1878, an attempt was made to liberate Murad from the Çırağan Palace, and restore him to the throne. Süleyman and his elder half-brother Şehzade Ahmed Kemaleddin, and elder half-sisters, Fatma Sultan and Seniha Sultan, and her husband Mahmud Celaleddin Pasha were all involved in the plot, as were Şevkefza Sultan, Murad's mother, and Servetseza Kadin, Abdülmejid's first consort. They all wanted to see the rightful Sultan on the throne. During the incident Ali Suavi, the radical political opponent of Abdul Hamid's authoritarian regime stormed the palace with a band of armed refugees from the recent Russo-Turkish War (1877–1878). Ali Suavi's men were unable to overcome the fierce resistance of the Beşiktaş police prefect, Hacı Hasan Pasha. The plot failed, and Ali Suavi and most of his men were killed. In the aftermath, security at the Çırağan Palace was tightened. Servetseza died a few months later; according to many, he was poisoned by Abdülhamid II.

== Personal life ==
Süleyman was allocated apartments in the Feriye Palace. He and his family used to spend their summers at Nisbettiye Mansion at Bosporus and the winters at Feriye Palace. He also owned a farmhouse in Balmumcu.

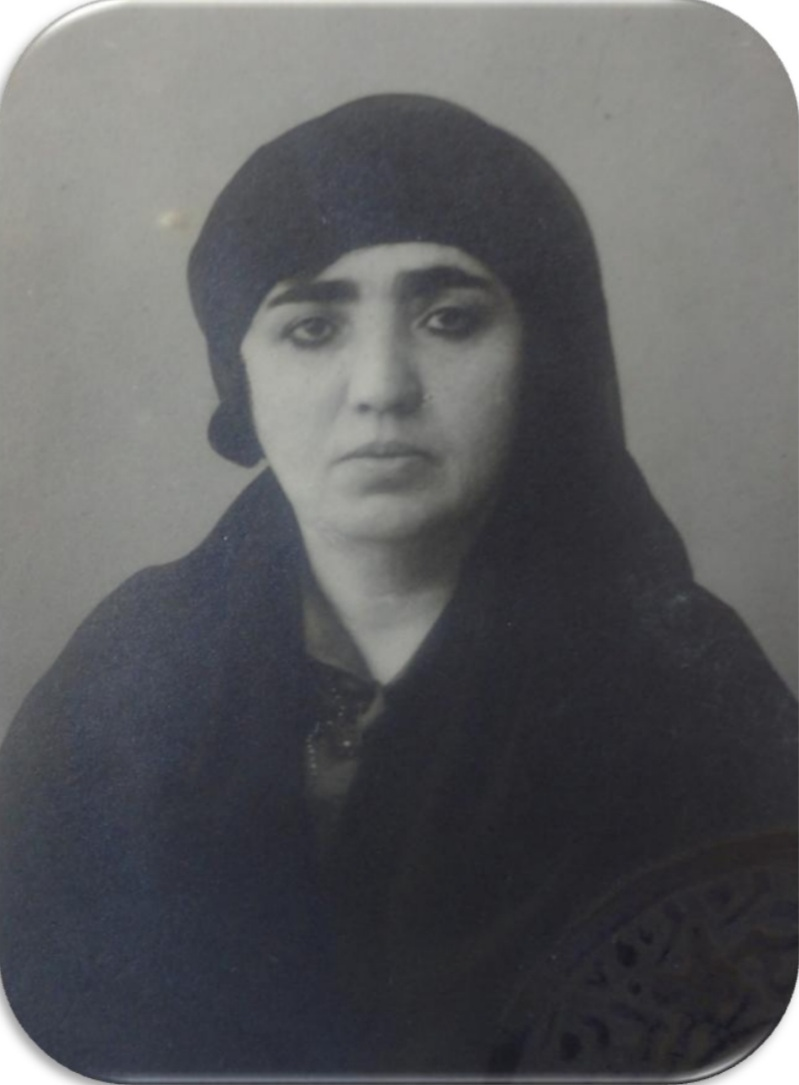
Süleyman's second wife, Emine Cavidan Hanım

His first wife was Filişan Hanım. She was born on 17 July 1869 in Batumi, Georgia, Caucasus Viceroyalty, Russian Empire. They married on 10 October 1885. She remained childless. A benevolent person, she looked after Naciye Sultan, and helped her in her lessons, and playing piano. She also looked after Naciye's eldest daughter, Mahpeyker Hanımsultan. She died in 1947 in Bebek, Istanbul.

His second wife was Emine Cavidan Hanım. She was the daughter of Bezmiara Kadın, who was the former wife of Sultan Abdulmejid, whom she had divorced marrying Tevfik Pasha. Cavidan was born on 28 October 1862, and was raised by the Egyptian Princess Zeynep Hanım, daughter of Muhammad Ali of Egypt. They married in 1886, with Zeynep Hanım's consent. She remained childless. However, the marriage didn't last long. After Abdul Hamid told Süleyman that she wasn't suitable for him, he divorced her. Abdul Hamid then married her to Prince Hüseyin Bey of Egypt.

His third wife was Fatma İkbal Hanım. She was born on 19 September 1871, in Adapazarı, Sakarya Province. They married in 1893. She was the mother of Şehzade Mehmed Abdülhalim, born on 28 September 1894. She died on 20 November 1932 and the age of sixty-one in Beşiktaş, Istanbul.

His fourth wife was Ayşe Tarziter Hanım. She was born on 4 February 1880 in Ganja, Azerbaijan, Caucasus Viceroyalty, Russian Empire. She was a member of Abkhazian family Bargan-Ipa. They married in 1895. She was the mother of Emine Naciye Sultan born on 25 October 1896, and Şehzade Mehmed Şerefeddin born on 19 May 1904. At the exile of the imperial family in March 1924, Tarziter and her son settled in Beirut, Lebanon.

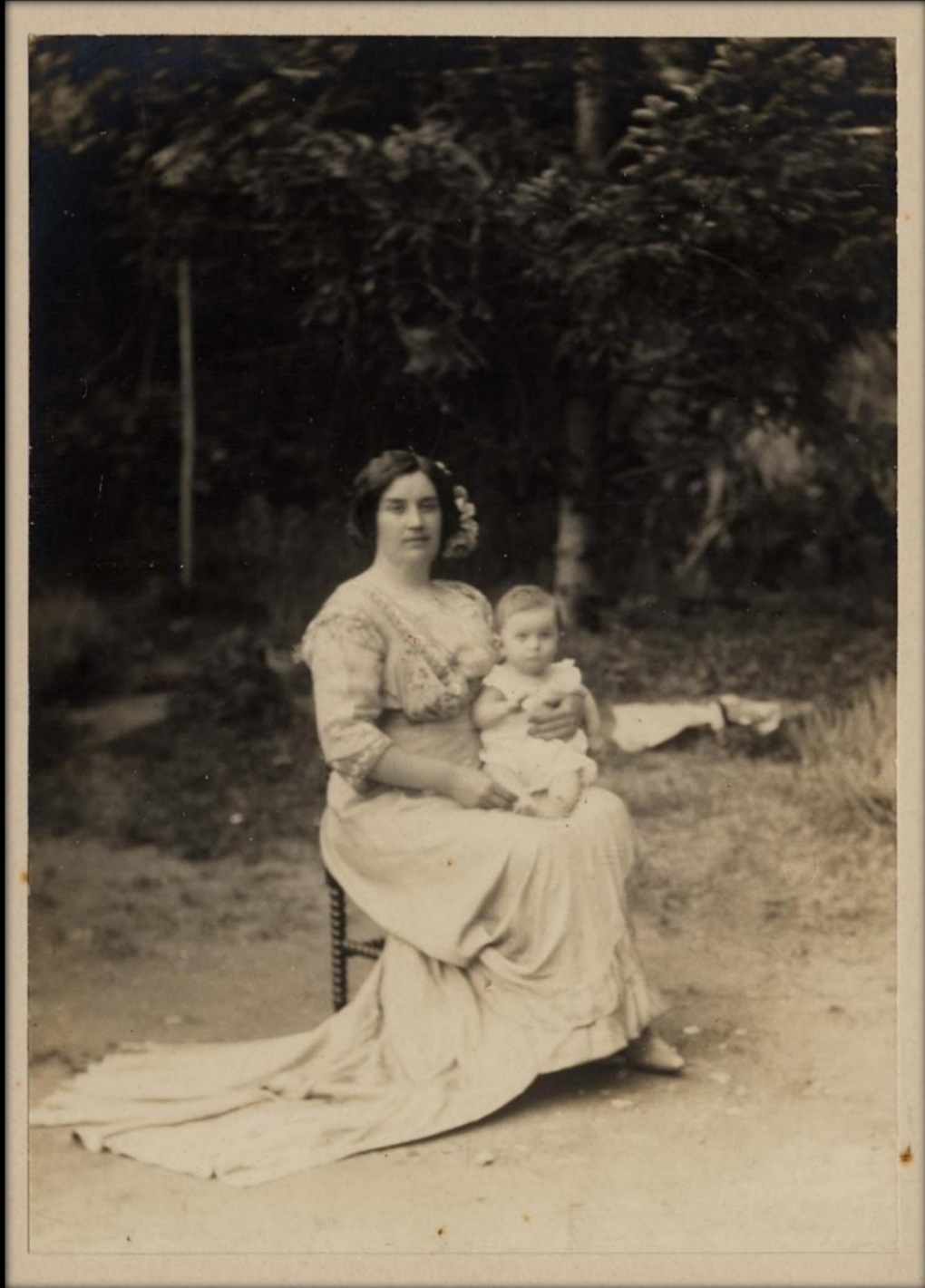
Süleyman's fourth wife Ayşe Tarziter Hanim, and her son Şehzade Şerafeddin sitting in her lap

His fifth and last wife was Ayşe Zatimelek Hanım. She was born in Uzuncaorman village, Hendek. She was the daughter of Prince Nuri Bey Tapş-Ipa and Princess Nazife Hanım Achba. She had a brother, Prince Rıza Bey Tapş-Ipa. She had been in the entourage of Sultan Abdulmejid's wife Verdicenan Kadın. Sometime later, she was sent to Dolmabahçe Palace, where she married Süleyman in 1899. After Süleyman's death in 1909, she moved to a mansion in Ortaköy. She started her work, devoted herself to charity and transformed the ground floor of her mansion into a tailor shop. She started to send items such as quilts, blankets and clothes that she sewed here with the help of a few people to the families of the soldiers working on the front. After the proclamation of republic in 1922, she moved in with her brother. In 1934, in accordance to the Surname Law, she took the surname "Tapşın". She died in Amasya in 1941, where her brother served as the deputy governor.

== Death ==
Şehzade Selim Süleyman died on 16 July 1909 at the age of forty eight, and was buried in the mausoleum of Şehzade Ahmed Kemaleddin, located in Yahya Efendi Cemetery, Istanbul.

== Personality ==
Süleyman was fluent in Arabic and Persian. He used to read Persian and Arabic literature. He loved to spend time in his farmhouse in Balmumcu. Of romantic nature, he loved music and nature. His adornment for Western music likely passed onto him from his mother. He was also a sportsman by avocation and had a penchant for horse riding.

== Issue ==
Name	Birth	Death	Notes
By Fatma İkbal Hanım (married 1893; 19 September 1871 – 20 November 1932)
Şehzade Mehmed Abdülhalim	28 September 1894	26 May 1926	born in Feriye Palace; married with issue; died in exile in Paris, France, and buried in the cemetery of the Sulaymaniyya Takiyya, Damascus, Syria
By Ayşe Tarziter Hanım (married 1895; born 4 February 1880)
Emine Naciye Sultan	25 October 1896	4 December 1957	born in Feriye Palace; married twice, and had issue one son, and three daughters; died in Nişantaşı, Istanbul, Turkey, buried in Yahya Efendi Cemetery
Şehzade Mehmed Şerafeddin	19 May 1904	c. 1966	born in Feriye Palace; married and had issue; died in exile in Beirut, Lebanon, and buried in the cemetery of the Sulaymaniyya Takiyya, Damascus, Syria

== Sources ==
- Brookes, Douglas Scott (January 1, 2010). The Concubine, the Princess, and the Teacher: Voices from the Ottoman Harem. University of Texas Press. ISBN 978-0-292-78335-5.
- Milanlıoğlu, Neval (2011). Emine Naciye Sultan'ın Hayatı (1896-1957) (Postgraguate Thesis) (in Turkish). Marmara University Institute of Social Sciences.
- Uluçay, Mustafa Çağatay (2011). Padişahların kadınları ve kızları. Ankara: Ötüken. ISBN 978-9-754-37840-5.
