= Fatma Sultan (daughter of Abdulmejid I) =

Ottoman princess, daughter of Abdulmejid I and Gülcemal Kadın

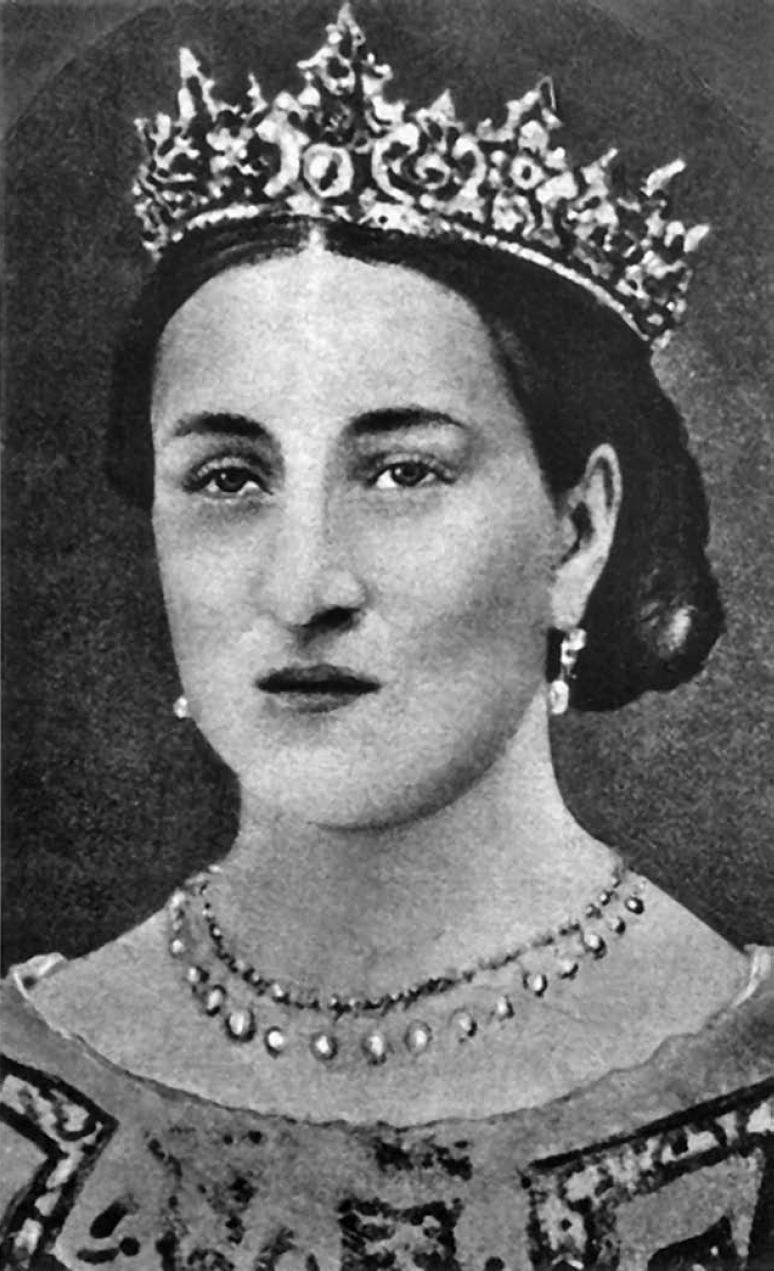
- Born: 1 November 1840; Beşiktaş Palace, Constantinople, Ottoman Empire
- Died: 26 August 1884 (aged 43); Baltalimanı Palace, Constantinople, Ottoman Empire
- Burial: New Mosque, Istanbul
- Spouse: Ali Galip Pasha (m. 1854; died 1858) Mehmed Nuri Pasha (m. 1859; died 1881)
- Issue: first marriage; Cemile Hanımsultan; second marriage; Sultanzade Mehmed Fuad Bey; Emine Lütfiye Hanımsultan
Names
- Fatma binti Abdulmejid Han
- Dynasty: Ottoman
- Father: Abdulmejid I
- Mother: Biological; Gülcemal Kadın; Adoptive; Servetseza Kadın
- Religion: Sunni Islam

Fatma Sultan (Ottoman Turkish: فاطمه سلطان; 1 November 1840 – 26 August 1884) was an Ottoman princess, the daughter of Sultan Abdulmejid I and one of his consort Gülcemal Kadın and a full sister of Sultan Mehmed V of the Ottoman Empire.

== Early life ==
Fatma Sultan was born on 1 November 1840 in the Beşiktaş Palace. Her father was Sultan Abdulmejid I, and her mother was Gülcemal Kadın, a Bosnian. She was the second child and eldest daughter born to her father, and the eldest daughter of her mother. She had two twins sisters Refia Sultan and Hatice Sultan (died as newborn), one year younger than her, a brother Mehmed V, four years younger than her, and a sister Rukiye Sultan, born and died in 1850. After her mother's death in 1851, she and her siblings were adopted by Abdulmejid's first consort, Servetseza Kadın, who had no children of her own.

Abdulmejid wanted all his sons and daughters to have a high-level of education, which included both traditional subjects, including religious studies, and Western ones. Fatma's education began in 1847. She attended the lessons with her brother Şehzade Mehmed Reşad, her half-brothers Abdul Hamid and Murad, her sister Refia Sultan and her half-sister Cemile Sultan. She also learnt French from Saffet Pasha. According to her brother Mehmed, she inherited her mother's looks.

== First marriage ==
=== Engagement ===
When Fatma came of age, the sons of some of the most exalted personages aspired to the hand of the young princess. Mustafa Reşid Pasha and more especially his wife Adile Hanım, who was excessively proud, were particularly anxious that their son, Ali Galib Pasha, should become the Sultan's son-in-law. The other ministers wished to please the Grand vizier, and tried to induce their master to give the hand of the princess to the son of their colleague. After much pressing, the Sultan consented to the proposed union.

=== Wedding ===
Abdulmejid first purchased Mustafa Reşid Pasha's palace and waterfront house in Baltalimanı at a cost of 250,000 gold liras. He then gave freehold possession of these estates to his daughter Fatma Sultan, leaving the Pasha with a vast fortune to pay for the wedding expenses. Ali Galip Bey was appointed to Pasha's rank and made a member of the Meclis-i Vâlâ (Supreme Court).

The marriage which coincided with the most fervent period of the Crimean War, took place on 7 August 1854 in the Çırağan Palace. The bridal procession of Fatma Sultan left this palace, and traveled with "pomp and circumstance" partly by land and partly by sea, conveying the bride to Baltalimanı Palace. The wedding lasted seven days, and was consummated on 10 August.

=== Issue ===
The next year she gave birth to a daughter, Cemile Hanımsultan, who died in infancy.

== Second marriage ==
After the death of Ali Galib Pasha, who had an accident and drowned in the Bosphorus, in 1858, she married Mehmed Nuri Pasha, son of Arif Pasha on 24 March 1859. They had two children, Sultanzade Mehmed Fuad Bey and Emine Lütfiye Hanımsultan. Both of them died young. Following the dubious conviction and exile to Arabia of her husband for complicity in the death of Sultan Abdulaziz in 1876, Fatma withdrew to her palace. In 1878, she and her siblings including her half-brothers Prince Ahmed Kemaleddin, and Prince Selim Süleyman, and half-sister Seniha Sultan and her husband Mahmud Celaleddin Pasha, were all involved in the Ali Suavi incident with the objective of restoring Murad V to the throne. The coup failed and Fatma was placed under house arrest until her death. She continued to correspond throughout her life with Murad V, to whom she was the closest sibling. Her adoptive mother Servetseza Kadın, also a supporter of Murad V, mysteriously died a few months later.

In 1880, her husband Nuri Pasha stood trial at the Yıldız Court, which had been convened to investigate the assassination of Sultan Abdulaziz. He was found guilty and sentenced to death, but by the decree of Abdul Hamid, his sentence was commuted to exile. Abdul Hamid also instructed her to divorce Nuri Pasha, but due to her strained relationship with him she refused.

He was exiled to Taif, where he had lost his sanity, and died there in 1883. Fatma Sultan was deeply distressed by his death and never recovered. Contrary to that, it is also said that Abdul Hamid had executed him, despite him forgiving him and abrogating his death sentence.

== Relationship with Murad V ==
Fatma Sultan was the closest half-sister of Murad V, son of Abdülmecid I and Şevkefza Kadın, who was sultan for only three months in 1876, before being deposed by Abdul Hamid II, also a son of Abdulmejid I and another consort Tirimüjgan Kadın, for supposed mental incapacity, and locked up with his family in the Çırağan Palace.

Fatma was the relative who visited him most times. On one occasion the palace guards sent to Çırağan from Yıldız Palace attempted to prevent her from seeing her brother. Fatma, furious, screamed and threatened the guards, reminding them that she was a princess and that no one could prevent her from entering, least of all ensign, and that if she wanted to see Murad she would see him, even if she had to stay there all night. It took the intervention of the Beşiktaş police to disperse the crowd that stopped to watch and secure the carriage of the princess. In a panic, the guards sent a message to Abdul Hamid II, who sent one of his men, Cevher Ağa, with orders to allow Fatma to enter and see Murad and to tell her that the guards were new and had misunderstood the Sultan's orders, who would never stop his family members from visiting each other. On another occasion, worried about Murad's health, she managed to have him examined by her personal doctor, sent secretly to his palace disguised as a Kalfa.

Fatma was part of a faction that considered Abdul Hamid II a usurper and believed that the throne should be returned to Murad V. For her, her personal dislike for Abdülhamid and her love for Murad were added to her political motives. In 1878, together with other allies including Şevkefza Sultan, mother of Murad, Servetseza Kadın, adoptive mother of Fatma, Şehzade Ahmed Kemaleddin and Şehzade Selim Süleyman, her and Murad's half brothers, Seniha Sultan, their half-sister, and Seniha's husband, Mahmud Celaleddin Pasha, plotted to restore Murad to the throne, but the coup, carried out by Ali Suavi on 20 May 1878, failed due to the prefect of Beşiktaş Police, Hacı Hasan Pasha. His men were killed and the conspirators belonging to the royal family, although not executed, were placed under house arrest or severe restrictions and controls. The imprisonment of Murad and his family was made even more rigid.

Though isolated, Fatma never ceased to write to Murad V and his family and to express her affection and support.

== Death ==
Fatma died on 26 August 1884 at the age of forty three and is buried in the mausoleum of Sultan Murad V at the New Mosque, Istanbul, despite having asked to be buried next to her father.

== Issue ==
Name	Birth	Death	Notes
By Ali Galib Pasha (married 7 August 1854; died 1858)
Cemile Hanımsultan	1855	1855	died in infancy
By Mehmed Nuri Pasha (married 24 March 1859; died 1883)
Sultanzade Mehmed Fuad Bey	1861	1864	died young
Emine Lutfiye Hanımsultan	February 1863	August 1865	died young

== See also ==
- List of Ottoman princesses

== Sources ==
- Brookes, Douglas Scott (2010). The Concubine, the Princess, and the Teacher: Voices from the Ottoman Harem. University of Texas Press. ISBN 978-0-292-78335-5.
- Sakaoğlu, Necdet (2008). Bu mülkün kadın sultanları: Vâlide sultanlar, hâtunlar, hasekiler, kadınefendiler, sultanefendiler. Oğlak Yayıncılık. ISBN 978-9-753-29623-6.
- Uluçay, Mustafa Çağatay (2011). Padişahların kadınları ve kızları. Ankara: Ötüken. ISBN 978-9-754-37840-5.
