= Şehzade Mehmed Abdülhalim =

Ottoman prince (1894–1926)

Şehzade Mehmed Abdulhalim
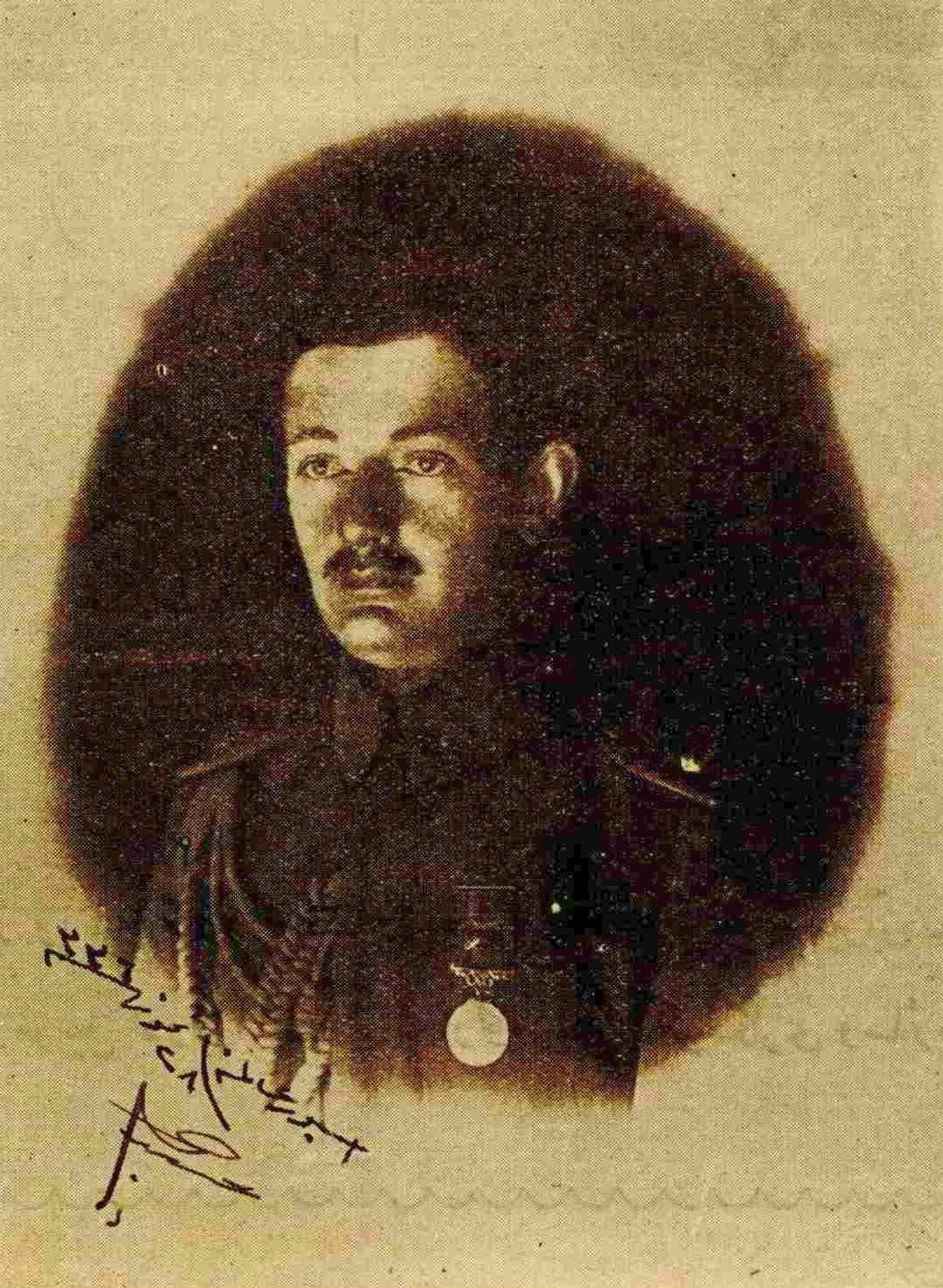
- Born: 28 September 1894; Feriye Palace, Istanbul, Ottoman Empire (present day Istanbul, Turkey)
- Died: 26 May 1926 (aged 31); Paris, France
- Spouse: Samiye Hanım (m. 1913)
- Issue: Fatma Samire Sultan; Şehzade Cengiz
Names
- Turkish: Şehzade Mehmed Abdülhalim; Ottoman Turkish: شهزاده محمد عبدالحلیم
- Dynasty: Ottoman
- Father: Şehzade Selim Süleyman
- Mother: Fatma İkbal Hanım
- Religion: Sunni Islam
- Military career
- Allegiance: Ottoman Empire; German Empire
- Branch: Ottoman Empire; Imperial German Army
- Service years: c. 1912–1922 (active service)
- Rank: See list

Şehzade Mehmed Abdülhalim Efendi (Ottoman Turkish: شهزادہ محمد عبدالحلیم; 28 September 1894 – 26 May 1926) was an Ottoman prince, the son of Şehzade Selim Süleyman, and the grandson of Sultan Abdulmejid I.

== Early life ==
Şehzade Mehmed Abdülhalim was born on 28 September 1894 in the Feriye Palace. His father was Şehzade Selim Süleyman, son of Sultan Abdulmejid I and Serfiraz Hanım and his mother was Fatma İkbal Hanım. In 1899, he was circumcised together with Şehzade Abdurrahim Hayri, son of Sultan Abdul Hamid II and Şehzade Mehmed Cemaleddin, son of Şehzade Mehmed Şevket.

== Education and career ==
In 1914, Abdülhalim along with other princes, Şehzade Abdurrahim Hayri, son of Sultan Abdul Hamid, Şehzade Osman Fuad, son of Şehzade Mehmed Selaheddin, were sent to the Potsdam Military Academy as the guests of Kaiser Wilhelm II, where Şehzade Ömer Faruk, the son of Abdulmejid II, later joined them. The Kaiser had admitted these four princes into the Imperial Guard of Hussars, the personal guard regiment of the Kaiser. After graduating from the Potsdam Military Academy he served as Captain at the Berlin royal court.

He participated in the Balkan Wars, that took place in the Balkan Peninsula in 1912 and 1913, and was injured in the war. During the First World War, he was given the command of the automobile detachments with the rank of colonel. Because of being the brother-in-law of the Minister of War, Enver Pasha, he was a popular prince. He supported the Ankara movement, and even helped many of his friends move to Anatolia. By 1918, he was serving as major in the infantry. He was also serving as honorary aide-de-camp to the Sultan.

== Personal life ==
In 1908, Sultan Abdul Hamid arranged his son Şehzade Abdurrahim's marriage to Abdülhalim's half-sister Naciye Sultan. However, Naciye and her family were not told of this decision. When they learned of it, Abdülhalim's father opposed it, as Naciye was only twelve years old at that time. However, his father couldn't oppose his brother, and was obliged to accept it, and so Naciye was engaged to Abdurrahim.

In 1909, after the engagement, Abdülhalim received a letter, which said that he will be killed if the engagement was not broken off. Abdülhalim's mother, İkbal Hanım, informed Sultan Mehmed V about this situation, after which the Sultan ordered the first secretary Halid Ziya Bey, to carry out an investigation. It turned out that Abdülhalim himself wrote this letter as he was against this engagement. After the incident, Sultan Mehmed broke off the engagement, and engaged Naciye to Enver Pasha.

Abdülhalim owned his father's villa in Bebek known as "Nisbettiye Mansion". His only wife was Samiye Hanım. She was born on 1 February 1896 in Üsküdar. They married on 10 August 1913 in the Nisbettiye Mansion. On 21 June 1920, she gave birth to Fatma Samire Sultan, followed three years later by Şehzade Cengiz, born on 23 December 1925. She died in 1947, and was buried in Bobigny cemetery.

== Exile and death ==
Upon the exile of the imperial family in March 1924, Abdülhalim and his family settled in Paris, France, where he died on 26 May 1926. He was buried in the cemetery of the Sulaymaniyya Takiyya, Damascus, Syria.

== Honours ==
Styles of Şehzade Mehmed Abdülhalim
- Reference style: His Imperial Highness
- Spoken style: Your Imperial Highness

- Order of the House of Osman
- Order of Glory, Jeweled
- Order of Distinction, Jeweled
- Order of Osmanieh, Jeweled
- Order of Medjidie, Jeweled
- Imtiyaz Medal in Silver
- Imtiyaz Medal in Gold
- Liakat War Medal
- Liakat Medal in Gold
- Turkish War Medal
- Imtiyaz War Medal in Gold
- Greek War Medal

=== Military appointments ===
==== Military ranks and army appointments ====
- c. 1912: Captain, German Army
- Colonel, Ottoman Army
- c. 1918: Major General of Infantry, Ottoman Army

==== Honorary appointments ====
- c. 1918: Aide-de-Camp to the Sultan

== Issue ==
Name	Birth	Death	Notes
Fatma Samire Sultan	21 June 1920	6 January 2000	Born in Nisbettiye Mansion; Married Hüseyin Shevki in 1947 in Cairo, Egypt, and had a daughter Necla Hanımsultan, born 1951 in Rio de Janeiro, Brazil; Died in New York City, and was buried in Washington Park Cemetery
Şehzade Cengiz	23 December 1925	10 October 1950	Born and died unmarried in Paris, France; Buried in Bobigny cemetery

== Sources ==
- Milanlıoğlu, Neval (2011). Emine Naciye Sultan'ın Hayatı (1896-1957) (Postgraguate Thesis) (in Turkish). Marmara University Institute of Social Sciences.
