= Refia Sultan (daughter of Abdulmejid I) =

Ottoman princess, daughter of Abdulmejid I

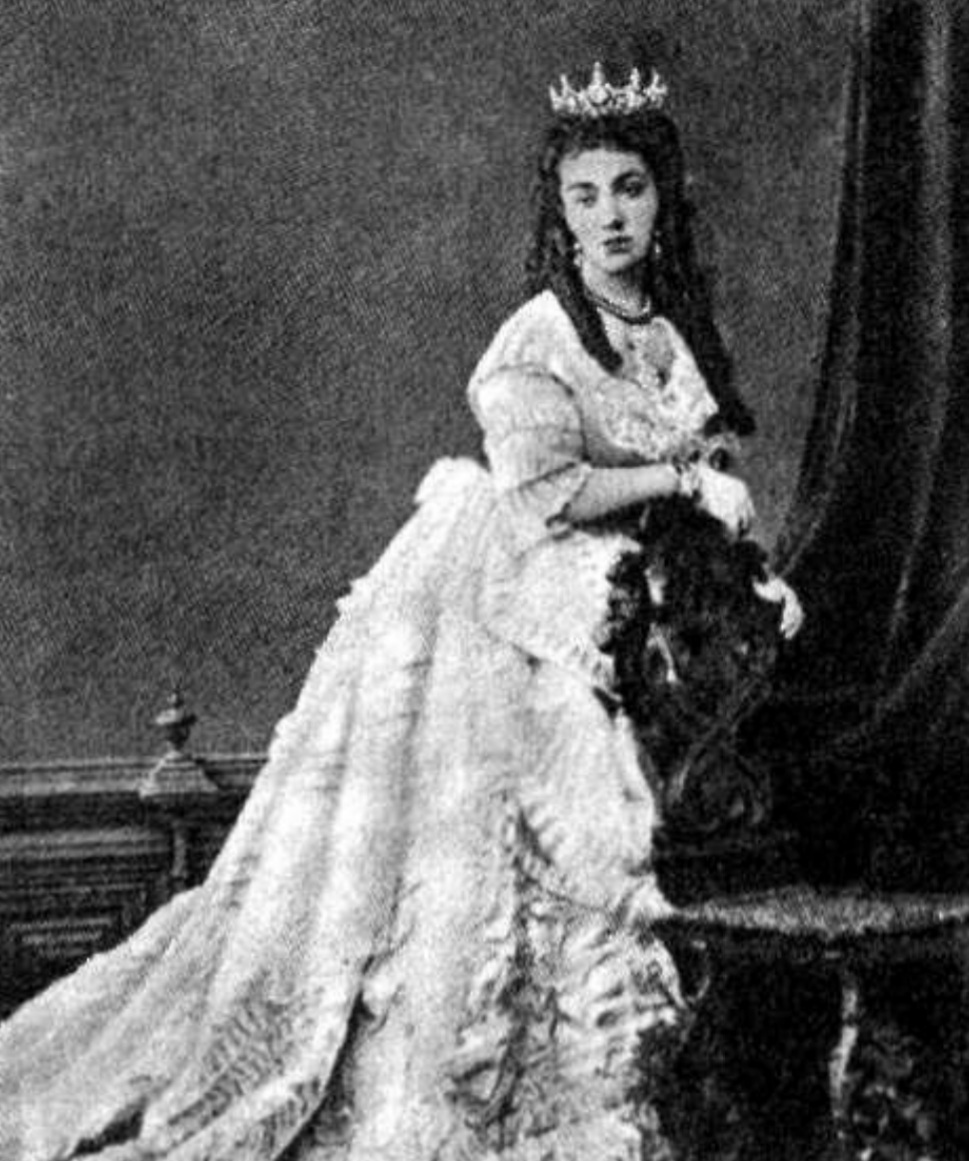
- Born: 7 February 1842; Beşiktaş Palace, Constantinople, Ottoman Empire
- Died: 4 January 1880 (aged 37); Defterdarburnu Palace, Constantinople, Ottoman Empire
- Burial: New Mosque, Istanbul
- Spouse: Mahmud Edhem Pasha (m. 1857)
- Dynasty: Ottoman
- Father: Abdulmejid I
- Mother: Biological; Gülcemal Kadın; Adoptive; Servetseza Kadın
- Religion: Sunni Islam

Refia Sultan (Ottoman Turkish: رفعیه سلطان; 7 February 1842 – 4 January 1880) was an Ottoman princess, daughter of Sultan Abdulmejid I and his consort Gülcemal Kadın. She was full sister of Sultan Mehmed V of the Ottoman Empire.

== Early life ==
Refia Sultan was born on 7 February 1842 in the Beşiktaş Palace. Her father was Sultan Abdulmejid I, and her mother was Gülcemal Kadın. She had an elder sister Fatma Sultan, one year elder then her, a twin sister Hatice Sultan, died as newborn, and a younger brother Mehmed V, two years younger than her, and a younger sister Rukiye Sultan, Born and died in 1850.

Upon the death of her mother in 1851, she and her siblings were adopted by Abdulmejid's first consort, Servetseza Kadın.

Abdulmejid wanted all his sons and daughters to have a high-level and as complete as possible education, which included both traditional subjects, including religious studies, and Western ones. Refia's education began in 1847. She attended the lessons with her brother Şehzade Mehmed Reşad, her half-brothers Abdul Hamid and Murad, her sister Fatma Sultan and her half-sister Cemile Sultan. Her education continued ever after marriage. She also learnt Arabic, Persian and French, and was refuted in both eastern and western music. She acquired her piano lessons from an Italian lady Therese Romano, which she took along with her half-sisters Münire Sultan and Behice Sultan. Moreover, she also learnt calligraphy.

== Marriage ==
On 22 February 1854, when Refia was twelve, Abdulmejid betrothed her to Mahmud Edhem Pasha, the son of Damat Mehmed Ali Pasha. Mehmed Ali Pasha had himself been married to Refia's aunt, Adile Sultan, with whom he had a son and three daughters, among them Hayriye Hanımsultan. Baronne Durand de Fontmagne, who lived in Istanbul for a year and a half in 1858–9 following the Crimean war, was shown the gifts about to be sent to Refia Sultan before her marriage. She noted that these included various preserves in 'not less than five hundred pots of very fine Dresden China'. The marriage took place on 21 July 1857, at the Topkapi Palace, and the couple were given a palace located at the Defterdarburnu as their residence. Among his ladies-in-waiting was Meyliservet Hanım, who would later become one of the consort of Refia's half-brother, Murad V.

The couple remained childless. The marriage turned out to be unhappy. It is understood from the letters that she wrote to her brothers that Edhem Pasha had a flirtatious behaviour. On the other hand, Edhem Pasha was not happy with this marriage because of the illness of Refia, who suffered from ovarian cysts, and other disagreements between the two of them. Refia, perhaps due to being ill herself, was very close to her half-sister Behice Sultan, who had contracted tuberculosis as a child and lived in isolation. Refia always sent Behice loving letters to cheer her up, even when she knew that her sister was on the verge of death.

== Character ==
Refia Sultan was particularly generous and compassionate. Especially during festivals, such as Eid-al-Adha, she gave rams and sheep to some relatives and her household staff. Her help and generosity attracted a great deal of attention from the general populace. As a matter of fact, due to her aid to the soldiers who were injured in the Russo-Turkish War (1877-78) and to the Muslim immigrants who had to leave their homes after the war, she was awarded the Order of Charity by her half-brother Sultan Abdul Hamid.

In addition to that, Refia also was equally grand with her lavishness. Spending more than the income of the palace women in the 19th century and especially during the reign of her father Abdulmejid became almost a tradition. She was also raised in this period and was influenced by the passion of shopping and fashion of other women in the palace. In fact, this was the result and necessity of a new lifestyle similar to that in the West. As a matter of fact, she ordered harnesses and carriages from Paris and her clothing and jewels needs.

The princess ordered goods and clothes from both Istanbul and France through her French teacher, Maria Tirard. Other foreign women, such as Tirard, who communicated with the palace, not only ensured the spread of western culture among the women of the palace but also provoked them to follow Western fashion. In addition, she paid high sums to support two official photographers, Abdullah Fréres and Vasilaki Kargopoulo, and to commission several renowned artists to paint paintings of various sizes and charcoal drawings.

== Death ==
Refia suffered throughout her life from ovarian cysts. The disease worsened starting in 1875. She died at the age of thirty seven on 4 January 1880, following several operations. She died a week after the last operation. She is buried alongside her mother in the mausoleum of the imperial ladies at the New Mosque, Istanbul.

== Philanthropy ==
Refia was described as compassionate, sensitive, gentle and generous. She frequently endowed various gifts to the tombs of prominent religious figures in Istanbul and other parts of the country; for instance, she sent a bolt of floral-patterned shawl fabric to the Tomb of Eyüp Sultan. She also gifted a clock to the Tomb of Cafer Baba, located at Zindankapısı.

Furthermore, she bestowed significant gifts upon nearly everyone who worked or served in her palace. She also presented her concubines with dowry sets of considerable material value. In addition, she had a water pump installed in Karacaahmet to meet the local population's need for water.

== Honours ==
Styles of Refia Sultan
- Reference style: Her Imperial Highness
- Spoken style: Your Imperial Highness

- Order of Charity, 1st class, 1877-78

== See also ==
- List of Ottoman princesses

== Sources ==
- Brookes, Douglas Scott (2010). The Concubine, the Princess, and the Teacher: Voices from the Ottoman Harem. University of Texas Press. ISBN 978-0-292-78335-5.
- Sakaoğlu, Necdet (2008). Bu mülkün kadın sultanları: Vâlide sultanlar, hâtunlar, hasekiler, kadınefendiler, sultanefendiler. Oğlak Yayıncılık. pp. 613–618. ISBN 978-9-753-29623-6.
- Kolay, Arif (2017). Osmanlı Saray Hayatından Bir Kesit: Ali Akyıldız ve Mümin ve Müsrif Bir Padişah Kızı Refia Sultan.
- Uluçay, Mustafa Çağatay (2011). Padişahların kadınları ve kızları. Ankara, Ötüken.
