= Gülcemal Kadın =

Consort of Ottoman Sultan Abdülmecid I

- Born: c. 1826; Sarajevo, Bosnia Eyalet
- Died: 29 November 1851 (aged 24–25); Constantinople, Ottoman Empire (present day Istanbul, Turkey)
- Burial: Imperial ladies Mausoleum, New Mosque, Istanbul
- Spouse: Abdulmejid I (m. 1840)
- Issue: Fatma Sultan; Refia Sultan; Hatice Sultan; Mehmed V; Rukiye Sultan
Names
- Turkish: Gülcemal Kadın; Ottoman Turkish: کل جمال قادین
- House: Ottoman (by marriage)
- Religion: Sunni Islam

Gülcemal Kadın (Ottoman Turkish: گل جمال قادین, lit. 'face of rose'; c. 1826 – 29 November 1851) was a consort of Sultan Abdulmejid I, and the mother of Sultan Mehmed V of the Ottoman Empire.

== Early life ==
Of Bosnian origin, Gülcemal Kadın was born around 1826 at Sarajevo. She had one sister, Bimisal Hanım. She was also related to Sabit Bey, who became Master of Robes to her son Sultan Mehmed, and his sister, the Sultan's Sixth Hazinedar, Nevfer Kalfa. She was blonde, known for her extraordinary beauty, but of delicate health.

== Marriage ==
Gülcemal married Abdulmejid in 1840, and was given the title of "Third Ikbal". She was one of the most beloved consorts.

On 1 November 1840, she gave birth to her first child, a daughter, Fatma Sultan, in the Old Beşiktaş Palace.

In 1842, she was elevated to the title of "Second Ikbal". On 3 February 1842, she gave birth to two twins daughters, Refia Sultan and Hatice Sultan (who died as newborn) in the Old Beşiktaş Palace.

In 1843 she was elevated to the title of "Fifth Kadın". On 2 November 1844, she gave birth to her fourth child, a son, Şehzade Mehmed Reşad (future Mehmed V) in the Old Çırağan Palace. In 1845, she was elevated to the title of "Fourth Kadın".

In 1850, she gave birth her last child, a daughter, Rukiye Sultan, who died the same year.

== Death ==
She died of tuberculosis on 29 November 1851 in Istanbul. She was never Valide sultan to her son, because she died before Mehmed Reşad's accession to the Ottoman throne. She is buried in the mausoleum of the imperial ladies at the New Mosque Istanbul.

All the three of her alive children were adopted by Servetseza Kadın, first consort of Abdulmejid.

Really beloved by Abdülmecid, he did everything to save her life. To her doctor, İsmail Paşah, he declared: ”… I have had the most genuine conversations with this woman. Since I was a youth, I have loved her with my all heart..“.

== Legacy ==
The ocean liner SS Germanic (1874) was renamed Gul Djemal when she entered the Ottoman service in 1911, in memory of Gülcemal Kadın. When the ship was sold yet again, this time to Turkiye Seyrisefain Idaresi, it was renamed Gulcemal.

== Issue ==
Name	Birth	Death	Notes
Fatma Sultan	1 November 1840	26 August 1884	married twice, and had issue, one son and two daughters
Refia Sultan	7 February 1842	4 January 1880	Twin sister of Hatice Sultan, she married once, had a daughter
Hatice Sultan	7 February 1842	1842	Twin sister of Refia Sultan
Mehmed V Reşad	2 November 1844	3 July 1918	35th Sultan of the Ottoman Empire
Rukiye Sultan	1850	1850	

== In literature ==
- Gülcemal is a character in Hıfzı Topuz's historical novel Abdülmecit: İmparatorluk Çökerken Sarayda 22 Yıl: Roman (2009).

== See also ==
- Kadın (title)
- Ottoman Imperial Harem
- List of consorts of the Ottoman sultans
- List of mothers of the Ottoman sultans

== Sources ==
- Sakaoğlu, Necdet (2008). Bu Mülkün Kadın Sultanları: Vâlide Sultanlar, Hâtunlar, Hasekiler, Kandınefendiler, Sultanefendiler. Oğlak Yayıncılık. ISBN 978-6-051-71079-2.
- Uluçay, M. Çağatay (2011). Padişahların kadınları ve kızları. Ötüken. ISBN 978-9-754-37840-5.
- Brookes, Douglas Scott (2010). The Concubine, the Princess, and the Teacher: Voices from the Ottoman Harem. University of Texas Press. ISBN 978-0-292-78335-5.
- Paşa, Ahmed Cevdet (1960). Tezâkir. [2]. 13 - 20, Volume 2. Türk Tarih Kurumu Basımevi.
