= Mahmud Celâleddin =

Mahmud Celâleddin may refer to:

- Mahmud Celaleddin Efendi (d. 1829), Ottoman calligrapher
- Damat Mahmud Celâleddin Pasha (1836-1884), Ottoman politician and damat
- Mahmud Celaleddin Pasha (1839 – 1899), Ottoman statesman and composer
- Damat Mahmud Celaleddin Pasha (1853–1903), Ottoman statesman, poet and writer
- Mahmud Celâleddin "Celâl" Bayar (1883 – 1986), Third president of Turkey
