= Great Fire of 1660 =

Fire in Istanbul in 1660

Two-thirds of Constantinople (now Istanbul) was destroyed in the Great Fire of 1660. The chronicler Abdi Paşa estimated that the fire destroyed 280,000 houses and burned for approximately forty-nine hours.

During the reconstruction of the city, the Ottomans enacted unprecedented policies concerning Christian and Jewish houses of worship. In previous periods, the Ottomans had usually allowed the rebuilding of churches and synagogues. However, in this period they did not.

== Background ==
On July 24, 1660, a great fire broke out in Constantinople, destroying two-thirds of the city. Contemporary sources report that thousands of homes were engulfed in the blaze. The fire began west of Eminönü and consumed densely populated neighborhoods filled with old-fashioned wooden houses. Abdi Paşa described the fire as having "marched across the city like an invading army." Contemporary sources estimate that 280,000 homes were destroyed and 40,000 lives were lost in the conflagration. The fire also destroyed seven synagogues and at least 25 churches.

== Aftermath ==
Marc David Baer has written that imperial mosques in the Ottoman Empire marked the boundaries of Ottoman territory and supported political and hegemonic interests.

The Yeni Valide Mosque or New Mosque project had started while Mehmed III's mother, Safiye Sultan, was Valide Sultan of the Ottoman Empire, but the project was abandoned for several decades after her death. Construction of the site's foundation had initially started on land that had been taken from the non-Muslims in the area of Eminönü in Constantinople, but they had started to return to nearby areas. The imperial family remained uninterested in completing the New Mosque project until the fire destroyed the entire area between Unkapanı and Eminönü in 1660, after which the non-Muslim population was once again deprived of their properties. When the government began to rebuild the city a ban was issued forbidding the reconstruction of churches and synagogues.

The young Grand Vizier Köprülü Fazıl Ahmed invited the Kadizadeli preacher Vani Mehmet Efendi to Constantinople. Upon Vani's advice, the sultan forbade consumption of tobacco, coffee and alcohol and insisted on strict enforcement of Islamic law. He destroyed Sufi tombs and either exiled or executed Sufi leaders.

Vani claimed that the disproportionate destruction of Jewish property in the Great Fire was a sign of divine displeasure. He supported legislation barring them from returning to the area. Köprülü Fazıl Ahmed confiscated all the lands where synagogues had stood and auctioned them. Non-Muslims were forbidden from bidding on the properties. Turhan Sultan sponsored the construction of the New Mosque. It opened in 1665 and Vani Mehmet Efendi became its first preacher.

After a time, Christians were allowed to buy back the land where churches had stood and rebuild them. The rebuilt churches were officially listed as residential buildings.

== Sources ==
- Baer, Marc David (2004). "The great fire of 1660 and the Islamization of Christian and Jewish space in Istanbul". International Journal of Middle East Studies. 36 (2): 159–181. doi:10.1017/S002074380436201X. JSTOR 3880030. S2CID 161640738.
- Baer, Marc David (2008). Honored by the Glory of Islam: Conversion and Conquest in Ottoman Empire. New York: Oxford University Press. ISBN 978-0-19-533175-2.
- Thys-Senocak, Lucienne (1998). "The Yeni Valide Mosque Complex at Eminonu". Muqarnas. 15: 58–70. doi:10.2307/1523277. JSTOR 1523277.
- Parker, Geoffrey (2013). Global Crisis: War, Climate Change and Catastrophe in the Seventeenth Century. New Haven, CT: Yale University Press. ISBN 978-0-300-15323-1.
- Zdanowski, Jerzy (2014). Middle Eastern Societies in the 20th Century. Newcastle upon Tyne, UK: Cambridge Scholars Publishing. ISBN 978-1-4438-6606-4.
