= Servetseza Kadın =

Consort of Ottoman Sultan Abdulmejid I (1823–1878)

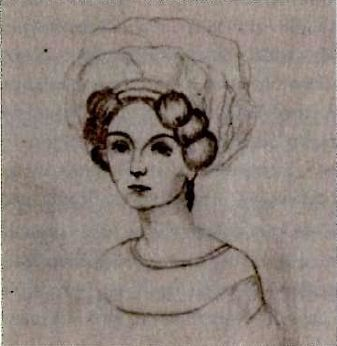

Baş Kadın of the Ottoman Empire (Chief Consort)
- Tenure: 2 July 1839 - 25 June 1861
- Predecessor: Nevfidan Kadın
- Successor: Dürrinev Kadın
- Born: 1823; Maykop, Adyghe
- Died: 24 September 1878 (aged 54–55); Kabataş Palace, Kabataş, Istanbul, Ottoman Empire
- Burial: Yavuz Selim Mosque, Istanbul
- Consort: Abdulmejid I (m. 1839; died 1861)
- Issue: Adopted: Fatma Sultan; Refia Sultan; Mehmed V
Names
- Turkish: Servetseza Kadın; Ottoman Turkish: ثروت سزا قادین
- House: Ottoman (by marriage); Temruko (by birth)
- Father: Prince Mansur Bey Temruko
- Mother: Dadeşkeliani princess
- Religion: Sunni Islam

Servetseza Kadın (Ottoman Turkish: ثروت سزا قادين; 1823 – 24 September 1878; meaning "Worthy of riches" in Persian) was the first and chief consort (BaşKadin) of Sultan Abdulmejid I of the Ottoman Empire.

== Early life ==
Of Circassian and Georgian origin, Servetseza Kadın belonged to the Temruko princely family. She was daughter of Prince Mansur Bey Temruko and one of his consorts, a Georgian princess of Dadeşkeliani family. Servetseza's birth name is unknown. She was born on 1823 in Maykop, Adyghe Republic's capital. She had been educated as part of the household of Esma Sultan, daughter of Sultan Abdul Hamid I, who gave her the name Servetseza.

== Marriage ==
When Abdulmejid ascended the throne, after the death of his father on 2 July 1839, Bezmiâlem Sultan, selected her as a consort for her son, the new Sultan, because Servetseza was half Georgian as Valide Sultan herself. The marriage took place in 1839, and Servetseza became his principal consort with the title of "BaşKadin" directly after the wedding, a position at which she remained throughout his reign.

Leyla Achba, writes in her memoirs that she was an intelligent and well cultured woman. Charles White, who visited Istanbul in 1843, said the following about her:

The Buyuk Kadin...is described by those ladies who knew her previously to her removal to the palace as an interesting and accomplished woman, but not extraordinary for extra charms.

One of her ladies-in-waiting was Dürrinev Hanim, who later became BaşKadin of Sultan Abdülaziz.

Servetseza remained childless, because Abdülmejid wasn't attracted to her, but she never complained and Abdülmecid respected her. After Gülcemal Kadın's death in 1851, her children, Fatma Sultan, Refia Sultan and Şehzade Mehmed Reşad (future Mehmed V) were entrusted to her care. She had asked Abdulmejid to take the motherless children under her wing, and raise as her own, and carried out the duties of a mother who cares for her children with compassion and concern. She loved as her own son the future Murad V, also.

When Bezmiâlem Sultan died in 1853, Servetseza was placed incharge of Abdulmejid's harem. Upon this occasion, Şevkefza Kadın took courage of Servetseza Kadın's affection for heir Şehzade Mehmed Murad (future Sultan Murad V) and Abdulmejid's wish to see his son as the next Sultan, and rose in opposition to Pertevniyal Sultan and her son Şehzade Abdulaziz (the future Sultan Abdulaziz).

== Widowhood, death and aftermath ==
Servetseza favored Murad V one of Abdülmecid's sons, whom she loved as hers, and on Abdülmecid's death tried to put him on the throne in place of his uncle Abdülaziz, who was the rightful heir, with the help of Murad's mother, Şevkefza Kadın, and a handmaid, Nakşifend Kalfa, as had been the will of the late sultan, but failed and Servetseza was hated along with her allies by Pertevniyal Sultan, Abdülaziz's mother.

After Abdulmejid's death on 25 June 1861, and the accession of his younger brother, Sultan Abdulaziz, Servetseza settled in the Kabataş Palace. In 1872, she commissioned a fountain in the courtyard of Özbekler Tekke in Üsküdar. She was apparently very fond of Murad, and after his deposition in 1876, she indiscreetly told many people that Abdul Hamid II had usurped the throne from him. She never recognized Abdül Hamid II as sultan and always referred to him as the "regent".

Servetseza died on 24 September 1878 at the age of fifty five, and was buried near the mausoleum of her husband at the Yavuz Selim Mosque, Istanbul. It is believed by some that she was murdered. One night in Ramadan she is said to have gone to Abdul Hamid and warned him. She ordered him to give the throne back to it to its rightful owner. After pretending to heed her warning, he arranged that she be served with a poisoned drink. She died upon her return to her palace. She was buried in the Sultan Selim Mosque.

Ali Fuad Türkgeldi Bey, Ottoman historian, described the event:

“Servetseza considered Abdülhamid II only a regent and thought that her beloved Murad V, now recovered, should be reinstated as sultan. To her adoptive son, Şehzade Reşad Efendi, she said that she would go visit Abdülhamid II (whom she did not recognise as sultan, as she called him “Hamid Efendi”) to warn him to give the throne back to Murad V. Reşad Efendi said: Mother, do not do such a thing! It will only bring shame on you and our brother Murad Efendi.” Nevertheless, Servetseza went to see the sultan that evening. To him, she said: “My lion, do you know why I’m here tonight? You’ve been acting as your brother’s regent for two years. Now it is time to give him back what is his right. Let him reign.” According to Ali Fuad, Abdülhamid agreed with her: “Well, you’re right, mother. I was already thinking about this. Let’s talk again after the fast-breaking meal”. When they met again, Abdülhamid served Servetseza a poisoned sherbet, which she drank. Taken back to Kabataş Palace, she died the following day.

Servetseza had been greatly benefited from her husband, Abdulmejid, and so the possessions she bequeathed amounted to a great sum in value, especially her jewels. For this reason, Abdul Hamid didn't surrender them to Reşad, and had her jewels brought to the Yıldız Palace for safekeeping along with two large trunks of her things. However, after Abdul Hamid was deposed in 1909, all the jewels and trunks were returned to the newly enthroned Sultan Mehmed Reşad.

== Issue ==
Servetseza had no children of her own, but she adopted her husband's three children with his consort Gülcemal Kadin when their mother died in 1851:

- Fatma Sultan (1 November 1840 - 26 August 1884). She married twice and had a son and two daughters.
- Refia Sultan (7 February 1842 - 4 January 1880). She had a twin sister, Hatice Sultan, who died newborn. She married once and had a daughter.
- Mehmed V Reşad (2 November 1844 - 3 July 1918). 35th Sultan of the Ottoman Empire.

== In literature ==
- Servetseza is a character in Hıfzı Topuz's historical novel Abdülmecit: İmparatorluk Çökerken Sarayda 22 Yıl: Roman (2009).

== See also ==
- Kadın (title)
- Ottoman Imperial Harem
- List of consorts of the Ottoman sultans

== Sources ==
- Açba, Leyla; Açba, Harun (2004). Bir Çerkes prensesinin harem hatıraları. L & M. ISBN 978-9-756-49131-7.
- Bey, Mehmet Süreyya (1969). Osmanlı devletinde kim kimdi, Volume 1. Küğ Yayını.
- Brookes, Douglas S. (February 4, 2020). On the Sultan's Service: Halid Ziya Uşaklıgil's Memoir of the Ottoman Palace, 1909–1912. Indiana University Press. ISBN 978-0-253-04553-9.
- Davis, Fanny (1986). The Ottoman Lady: A Social History from 1718 to 1918. Greenwood Publishing Group. ISBN 978-0-313-24811-5.
- Kurumu, Türk Tarih (1951). Türk Tarih Kurumu yayınları. Türk Tarih Kurumu Basımevı.
- Sakaoğlu, Necdet (2007). Famous Ottoman women. Avea.
- Sakaoğlu, Necdet (2008). Bu Mülkün Kadın Sultanları. Beyoğlu, İstanbul : Oğlak Yayıncılık ve Reklamcılık. ISBN 978-9-753-29299-3.
- Tuğlacı, Pars (1985a). Osmanlı Saray Kadınları. Cem Yayınevi.
- Tuğlacı, Pars (1985b). Türkiyeʼde kadın, Volume 3. Cem Yayınevi.
- Uluçay, Mustafa Çağatay (2011). Padişahların kadınları ve kızları. Ankara: Ötüken. ISBN 978-9-754-37840-5.
- White, Charles (1846). Three years in Constantinople; or, Domestic manners of the Turks in 1844. London, H. Colburn.
