= Serfiraz Hanım =

Consort of Ottoman Sultan Abdulmejid I

- Born: Ayşe Lah c. 1837; Tokat, Turkey, Ottoman Empire (ex)
- Died: 9 June 1905 (aged 67–68); Bebek Palace, Bebek, Beşiktaş, Istanbul, Ottoman Empire
- Burial: Şehzade Ahmed Kemaleddin Mausoleum, Yahya Efendi Cemetery, Istanbul
- Spouse: Abdulmejid I (m. 1851; died 1861)
- Issue: Sehzade Osman Seyfeddin; Bedihe Sultan; Şehzade Selim Süleyman
Names
- Turkish: Ayşe Serfiraz Hanım; Ottoman Turkish: سرفراز خانم
- House: Lah (by birth); Ottoman (by marriage)
- Father: Lah Osman Bey
- Mother: Zeliha Hanım
- Religion: Sunni Islam

Serfiraz Hanım (Turkish pronunciation: [sɛɾfiɾaz hanɯm]; Ottoman Turkish: سرفراز خانم; "triumphant" or "proud"; born Ayşe Lah; c. 1837 – 9 June 1905) was a consort of Sultan Abdulmejid I of the Ottoman Empire.

== Early life ==
Born in 1837 as Ayşe, Serfiraz Hanım was a member of the Abkhazian family, Lah, which had settled in Tokat. Her father was Lah Osman Bey and her mother his consort Zeliha Hanım, who came from the Tapsin family. She had one sister, Rana Hanım.

== Marriage ==
Serfiraz married Abdulmejid in 1851, and was granted the title of "Sixth Ikbal". On 12 June 1852, a year after the marriage, she gave birth to her first child, a son, Şehzade Osman Seyfeddin in the Çırağan Palace, who died at the age of three. In 1853, she was elevated to "Fourth Ikbal", in 1854 to "Third Ikbal", and in 1856 to "Second Ikbal". On 30 September 1857, she gave birth to her second child, a daughter, Bedihe Sultan (called also Bedia Sultan), who died a month old. Two years later, on 25 July 1860, she gave birth to her third child, a son, Şehzade Selim Süleyman.

=== As Abdulmejid's favourite wife ===
Serfiraz was known as the woman whom the sultan loved the most, and spoiled. He had presented her the Yıldız Mansion. At times she left her suite in Dolmabahçe Palace and moved to Yıldız Mansion, where she used to stay for a long time. She adored western music. She would spend huge money on Western musical instruments and musicians who knew how to play them. Her granddaughter claimed that her father, Şehzade Selim Süleyman, inherited his passion for music from her.

According to contemporary historian Ahmed Cevdet Pasha, Abdulmejid was charmed by her, and was therefore incapable of punishing her for anything. Due to her influence over Abdulmejid, nobody was able to say anything to her, and she was granted full freedom of movement and freed from the restriction of seclusion and gender segregation. Other women in the palace became jealous of her, because she did not allow the sultan to see any woman besides her and she limited his contact with his children, to prevent him or his consorts from using visits to them to meet their mothers, and they also began travelling through public spaces and Beyoğlu. Furthermore, their daughters also imitated them. Since this freedom was regarded to violate the prestige of the sultanate in the eyes of conservatives, the Sultan reportedly felt distressed but was unable to prevent it.

An anecdote reported by Cevdet reveals the nature of the relationship between Abdulmejid and Serfiraz. Once, the Sultan went to Serfiraz's room in the Imperial Harem, but she did not open the door. The Sultan demanded that she open the door and asked why she was not opening it, to which she replied, "a man like Rıza Pasha has been assigned to teach us good manners, which means that we are indecent. If I am indecent, then I can misbehave like this." Upon hearing this the sultan apologized to her and said, "I had to do this, but you should ignore him for a while." Abdülmejid had to break down the door to enter. Another time she left the Dolmabahçe Palace to go to Yıldız without permission and when the sultan ordered her to go back she refused, forcing him to go and get her in person.

=== Affair with Küçük Fesli ===
In 1855–1856, she developed a relationship with an Armenian man named Küçük Fesli. She spent a lot of money on him. The scandal was such that the boy was shot by Sultan's order. According to Zülfitab Hanım, her lady-in-waiting, Serfiraz was innocent and the scandal had been mounted and magnified by her enemies, including Şevkefza Kadın, Abdülmejid's Second Consort. After this scandal, Serfiraz's influence and power began to wane.

Therefore, his family sent petitions to the French and Russian embassies saying that Serfiraz was in love with him. However their son used to hide from the Halberdier troops she sent to call him, or gave them money to tell her they could not find him. However, the embassies omitted these passages in the petitions they gave to the Sublime Porte.

=== Expenses and debts ===
Cevdet also claims that she was the main reason for all "prodigality and debauchery". He described her as "enticing", and writes that she did as much harm as possible. According to him, not only the private treasury of the Sultan but the whole treasuries of the world would not be enough for her expenses. She wandered around in the bazaars and got into debt. In 1855, Abdulmejid's sisters, daughters and wives are said to have incurred a debt of 288,000 purses, approximately 1.15 million pounds sterling, of which, Serfiraz alone was responsible for 125,000 purses, approximately 500,000 pounds sterling.

Abdulmejid, on the other hand, was not able to say anything to her. He even obtained, with difficulty, 15,000 purses of gold for the palace employees and gave 5000 purses of it to Serfiraz. Cevdet further claims, referring to Serfiraz, “the state was showing signs of collapse due to the eagerness of a woman."

In 1858, Stamatello Volgo, a businessman, and Nicholas Pisani, a merchant, lent Osman Efendi, in his capacity as a representative and kahvecibaşi (chief coffee preparer) of Serfiraz, two large sums of money. Both loans amounted to 2,982,770 piasters and were paid to Osman in March 1858.

The two took their case to the Commercial Court in 1858. However, the court couldn't do anything for them, after which they appeared in front of the commission for the settlement of debts. The court ruled in their favor, and in May 1859, they received the equivalent of the first loan given to Osman by receiving thirty-three pieces of jewelry, which acted as collateral for the loan that was made in piasters. Though pleased with the payment, complications arose after Osman claimed that through that payment, the total amount of both loans was paid in full. Displeased with Osman's actions, the case was directed to the court of commerce.

This commission ruled in the two claimants' favour in April 1860, and Osman was ordered to pay them a total of 3,968,373 piasters and a monthly interest rate and commission payment of 2.5% until the total amount owed was paid. However, the two were still dissatisfied with the ruling, because nowhere in it had Serfiraz's name been recorded, after which they turned to their embassies to exercise their option.

The French Embassy requested that the Sublime Porte recall the judges who made the initial ruling, and have them rewrite it to include Serfiraz's name, after which the court of commerce directed a prosecution against her, a judgement to which she didn't protest. According to the new ruling, they had to return the jewelry that they previously received from Osman, but the saga didn't end there. Though this round of arbitration came to a close in 1860, for the next ten years both claimants sought restitution and repayment of the rest of the loan from Serfiraz and Osman. They claimed that the debt was the responsibility of the Ottoman government, and that it should thus be repaid by them.

The Russian ambassador, commenting on Serviraz's expenses, observed that: "A single woman is bringing down the Ottoman Empire".

== Fall and widowhood ==
Eventually the scandals, excessive spending and her haughtiness, combined with the pressure exerted on Abdülmejid by her enemies, resulted in the fall of Serfiraz from grace, who was denied access to Dolmabahçe Palace.

After losing the sultan's favor, Serfiraz and her one-year-old son, Şehzade Süleyman, settled in a mansion located in Ortaköy.

In March 1898, Serfiraz attended the wedding of Naime Sultan, the daughter of Sultan Abdul Hamid II, and Kemaleddin Pasha, the son of Gazi Osman Pasha.

Ayşe Sultan, daughter of Abdul Hamid II, notes in her memoirs that during her father's reign, Serfiraz would attend Ramadan celebrations, and would always sit next to Perestu Kadın.

== Death ==
Serfiraz Hanım settled with her son in his Bebek Palace, where she died on 9 June 1905. She was buried in the mausoleum of Şehzade Ahmed Kemaleddin in Yahya Efendi Cemetery, Istanbul.

== Issue ==
| Name | Birth | Death | Notes |
|---|---|---|---|
| Şehzade Osman Seyfeddin | 9 June 1852 | 2 July 1855 | born in Çırağan Palace; buried in Yavuz Selim Mosque |
| Bedihe Sultan | 30 September 1857 | 12 July 1858 | Called also Bedia Sultan, buried in Tomb of Gülistü Kadın |
| Şehzade Selim Süleyman | 25 July 1860 | 16 July 1909 | married five times, and had issue, two sons and one daughter |

== In literature ==
- Serfiraz is a character in Hıfzı Topuz's historical novel Abdülmecit: İmparatorluk Çökerken Sarayda 22 Yıl: Roman (2009).

== See also ==
- Ikbal (title)
- Ottoman Imperial Harem
- List of consorts of the Ottoman sultans

== Sources ==
- Brookes, Douglas Scott (2010). The Concubine, the Princess, and the Teacher: Voices from the Ottoman Harem. University of Texas Press. ISBN 978-0-292-78335-5.
- Castiglione, Frank (2016). Family of Empires: The Pisanis in the Ottoman and British Empires.
- Milanlıoğlu, Neval (2011). Emine Naciye Sultan'ın Hayatı (1896-1957).
- Paşa, Ahmed Cevdet (1960). Tezâkir. [2]. 13 - 20, Volume 2. Türk Tarih Kurumu Basımevi.
- Sakaoğlu, Necdet (2008). Bu Mülkün Kadın Sultanları: Vâlide Sultanlar, Hâtunlar, Hasekiler, Kandınefendiler, Sultanefendiler. Oğlak Yayıncılık. ISBN 978-6-051-71079-2.
- Sancak, Betül (2019). A Critical Approach Toward Cevdet Pasha's Understanding of Reform: Granviziers, Sultans, and Society in the Context of Tezakir and Maruzat.
- Uluçay, M. Çağatay (2011). Padişahların kadınları ve kızları. Ötüken. ISBN 978-9-754-37840-5.
