= New Mosque, Istanbul =

Mosque in Eminönü, Istanbul, Turkey

New Mosque
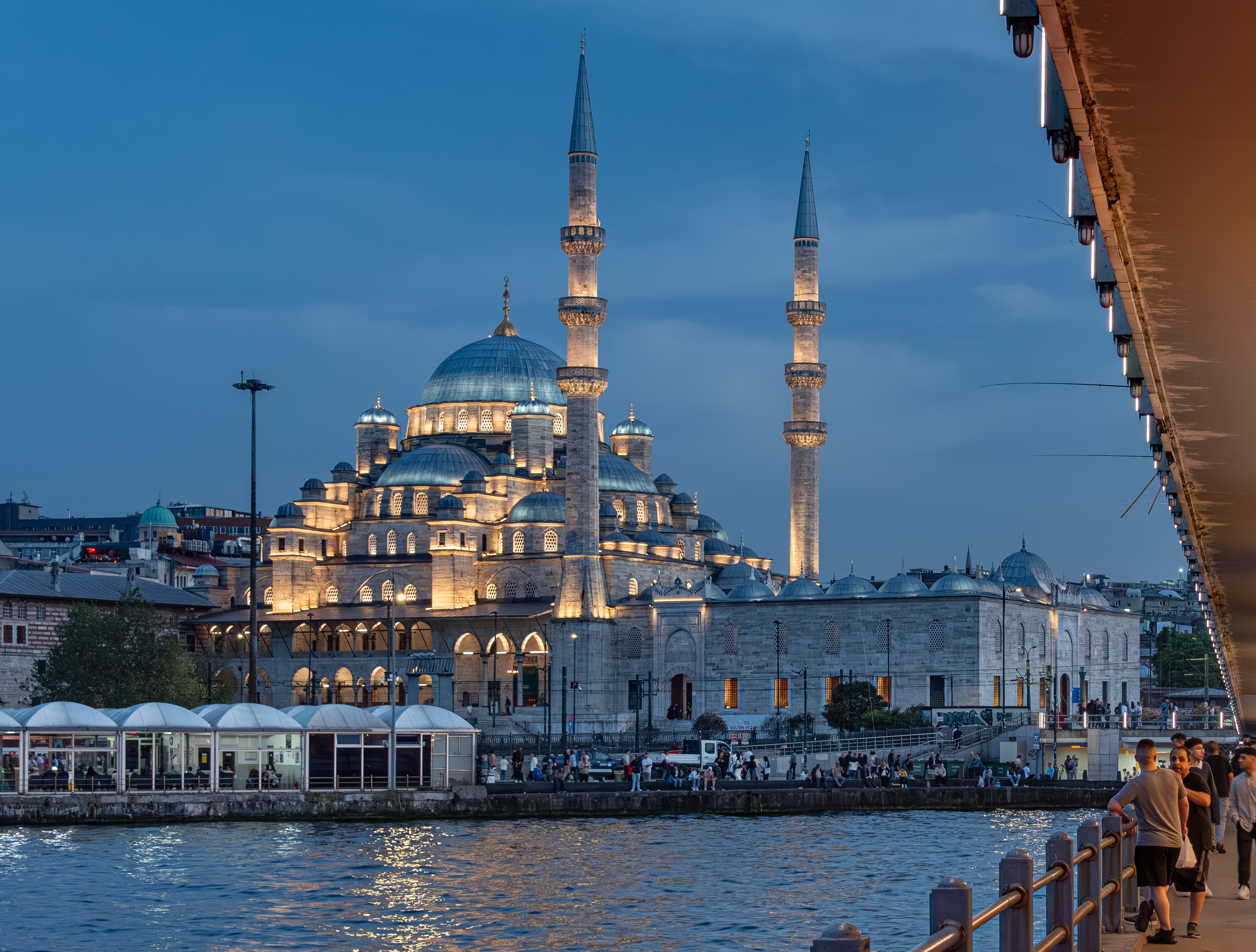
- New Mosque from the Galata Bridge

- Location in the Eminönü district of Istanbul

Religion
- Affiliation: Sunni Islam

Location
- Location: Istanbul, Turkey
- Coordinates: 41°1′1.25″N 28°58′17.3″E

Architecture
- Architects: Davut Ağa, Dalgıç Ahmed Çavuş, Mustafa Ağa
- Type: mosque
- Style: Ottoman
- General contractor: Sultan Mehmed IV
- Groundbreaking: 1597
- Completed: 1665

Specifications
- Dome height (outer): 36 meters (118 ft)
- Dome dia. (inner): 17.5 meters (57 ft)
- Minaret: 2
- Minaret height: 52 m
- Materials: cut stone, granite, marble

The New Mosque (Turkish: Yeni Cami, pronounced [jeni dʒami], originally named the Valide Sultan Mosque, Turkish: Valide Sultan Camii) and later New Valide Sultan Mosque (Turkish: Yeni Valide Sultan Camii) after its partial reconstruction and completion between 1660 and 1665, is an Ottoman imperial mosque located in the Eminönü quarter of Istanbul, Turkey. It is situated on the Golden Horn, at the southern end of the Galata Bridge, and is a notable Istanbul landmark marking the crossing from the old historic core of the city to the Beyoğlu (Pera) district. The mosque is a notable example of the Sultanate of Women period in Ottoman Empire.

== History ==
=== Valide Sultan Mosque ===
The construction of the mosque began in 1597. It was ordered by Safiye Sultan, who was the wife of Sultan Murad III and later Valide Sultan (Queen Mother) of Sultan Mehmed III. She ordered the mosque in her capacity as Valide Sultan, two years after Mehmed III's ascension to the Ottoman throne in 1595, hence the original formal name "Valide Sultan Mosque".

The original architect was Davut Ağa, an apprentice to the great Mimar Sinan. However, Davut Ağa died in 1599 and was replaced by Dalgıç Ahmed Çavuş. The construction took more than half a century and was completed by another Valide Sultan, Turhan Sultan, mother of Sultan Mehmed IV.

The project was hampered by political disconnect, and its location and monetary implications created dissent in the court. Eminönü was the city's foremost commercial centre, and home to a predominantly Jewish population. In situating the mosque there, Safiye Sultan hoped to extend the sphere of Islamic influence within the city, capitalising on the growing discontent of both local and foreign merchants who were concerned by the increasing influence of their Jewish counterparts, which gave the Sultan an easy justification for confiscating their property. However, the vast monetary outlay drew sharp criticism. In particular, the Janissaries resented the growing political power of the Valide sultan, and believed the mosque to be an unnecessary expenditure. Safiye was forced to abandon the project upon Mehmed III's death in 1603. The new Sultan, Ahmed I, had no interest in pursuing the project after Safiye was relegated to the harem and the construction was abandoned.

=== New Valide Sultan Mosque (New Mosque) ===
After 1603, the partially constructed structure gradually fell into ruins; and was severely damaged during the Great Fire of 1660 which destroyed many neighbourhoods in the city. Later that year, the imperial architect Mustafa Ağa suggested that Turhan Sultan, mother of Sultan Mehmed IV, should complete the project as a work of piety. Turhan also ordered the construction of the nearby Spice Bazaar, which forms a part of the külliye of the New Mosque. Thus, in the last months of 1660, the construction of the mosque was resumed, while the construction of the adjacent bazaar began.

The mosque was finally completed in 1663, and inaugurated in 1665. It was renamed the "New Valide Sultan Mosque" (Yeni Valide Sultan Camii). In time, this name was informally shortened as the "New Mosque" (Yeni Cami) among the public.

== Architecture ==
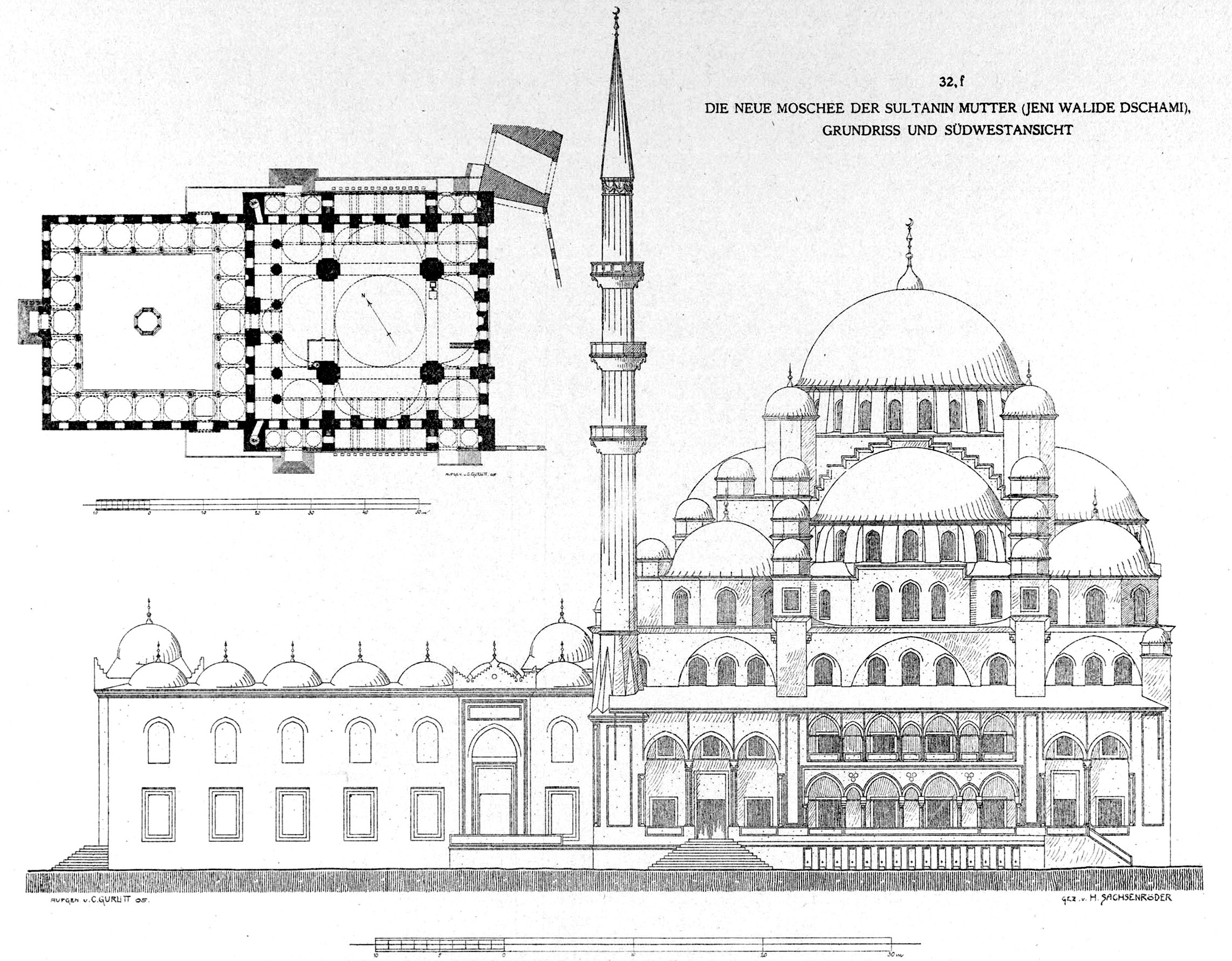
Elevation and plan published by Cornelius Gurlitt in 1912

=== Exterior ===
The exterior of the mosque boasts 66 domes and semi-domes in a pyramidal arrangement, as well as two minarets. The main dome measures 36 metres (118 feet) in height, and is supported by four flanking semi-domes. The dome plan of the New Mosque is based on the earlier Şehzade Mosque designed by Mimar Sinan, and on Sedefkar Mehmed Agha's Sultan Ahmed Mosque.

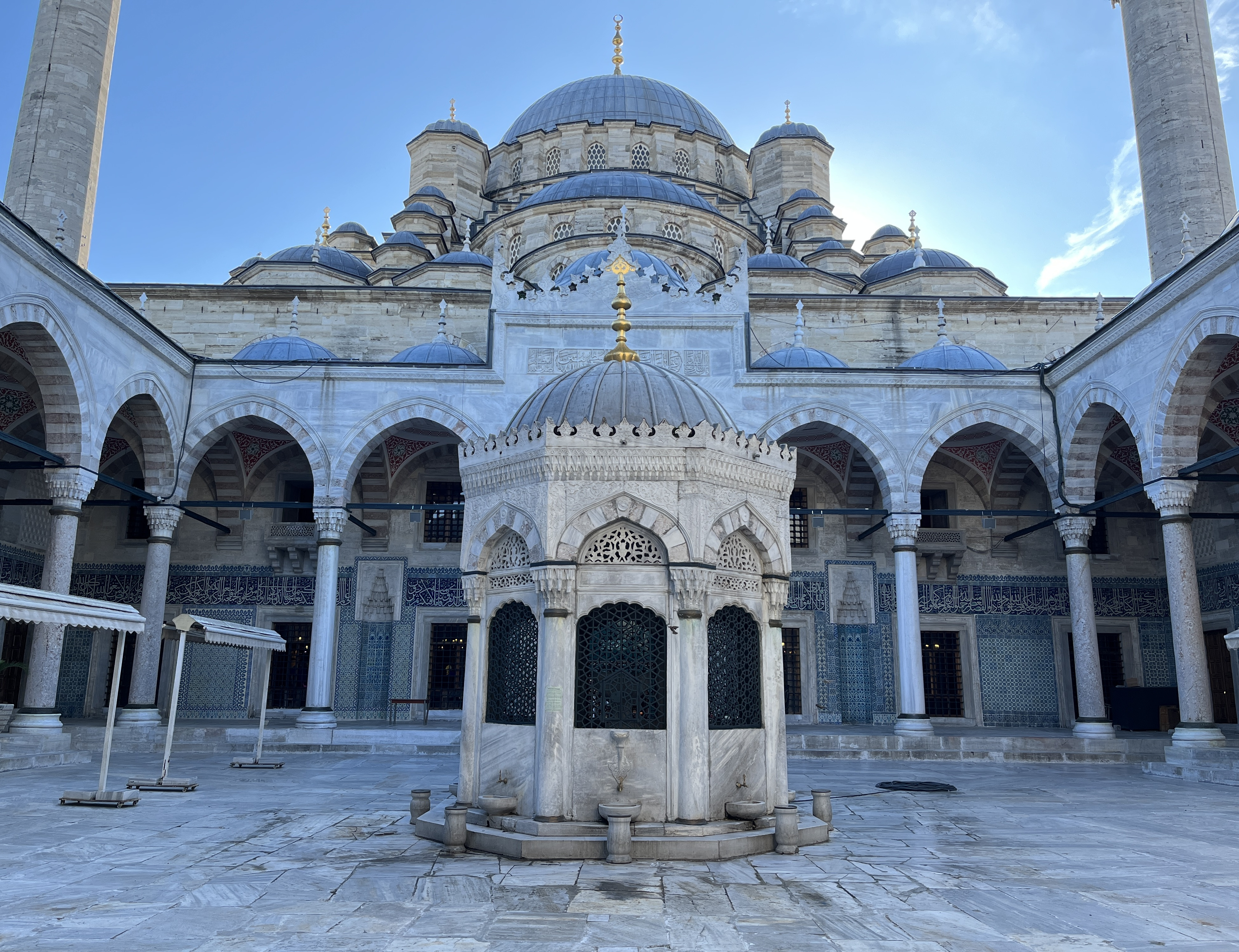
The courtyard of the mosque

As with other imperial mosques in Istanbul, the mosque itself is preceded by a monumental courtyard (avlu) on its west side. The courtyard of the New Mosque is 39 metres (128 feet) on a side, bordered on its inner side by a colonnaded peristyle covered by 24 small domes. An elegant şadırvan (ablution fountain) stands in the center, but is only ornamental. The actual ritual purifications are performed with water taps on the south wall of the mosque. The façade of the mosque under the porch is decorated with İznik tiles. Stone blocks supplied from the island of Rhodes were used in the construction of the mosque.

=== Interior ===
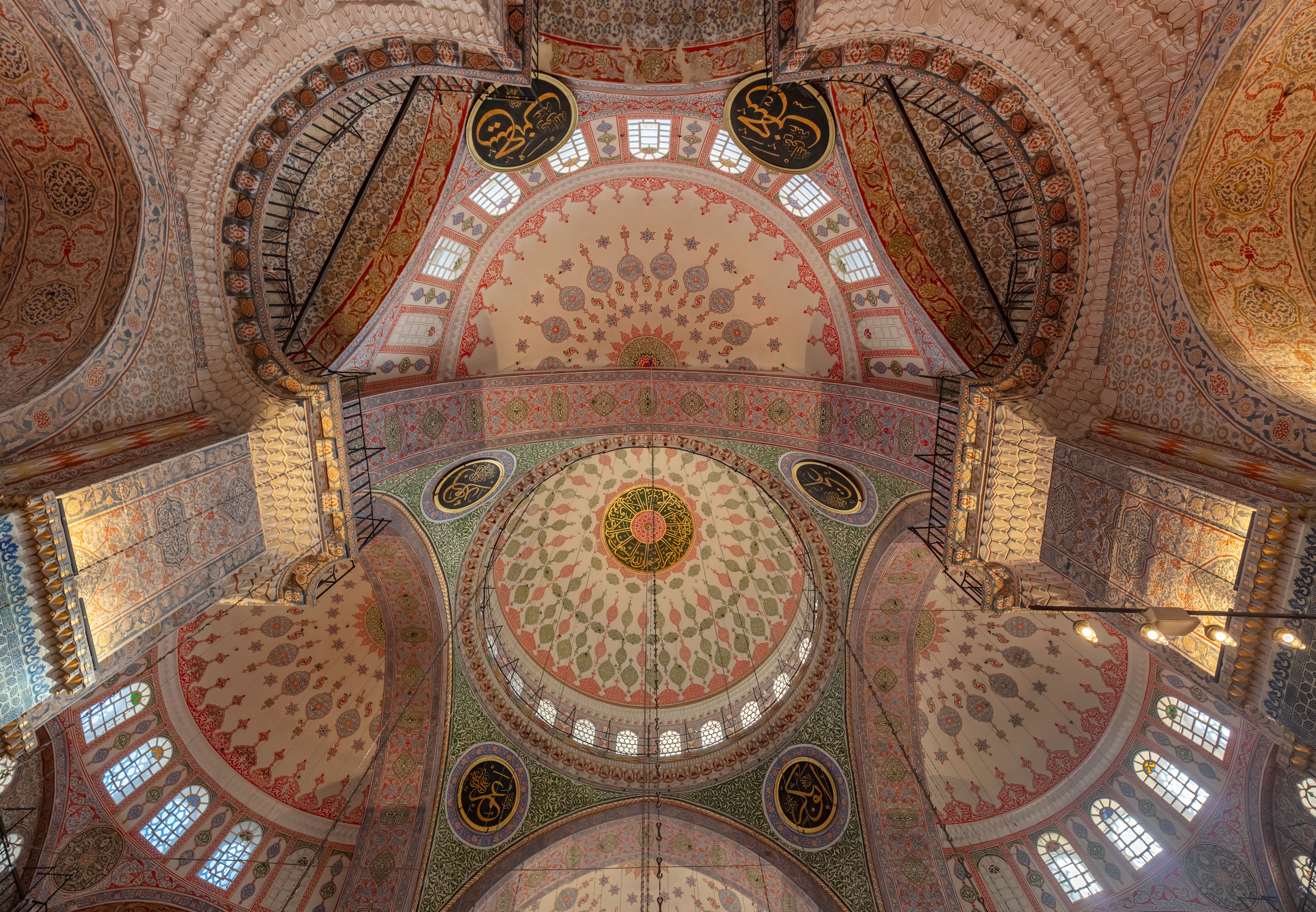
Ceiling

The interior of the mosque is square shaped and measures 41 metres (135 feet) on each side. The central area is defined by four large piers which are the main support for the dome. On the sides and rear of the central area are colonnades of slender marble columns connected by arches in a variety of styles. The dome is 17.5 metres (57 feet) in diameter and has a height of 36 metres (118 feet). Like many other Ottoman imperial mosques, on the 4 corners where the dome meets the pillars holding it up, are calligraphic plates with the names of the first four khalifahs, Abu Bakr, Umar, Uthman, and Ali. The interior space is extended with semi-domes along the east–west axis of the building, with smaller domes above each corner of the nave and even smaller domes above the corners of the galleries.

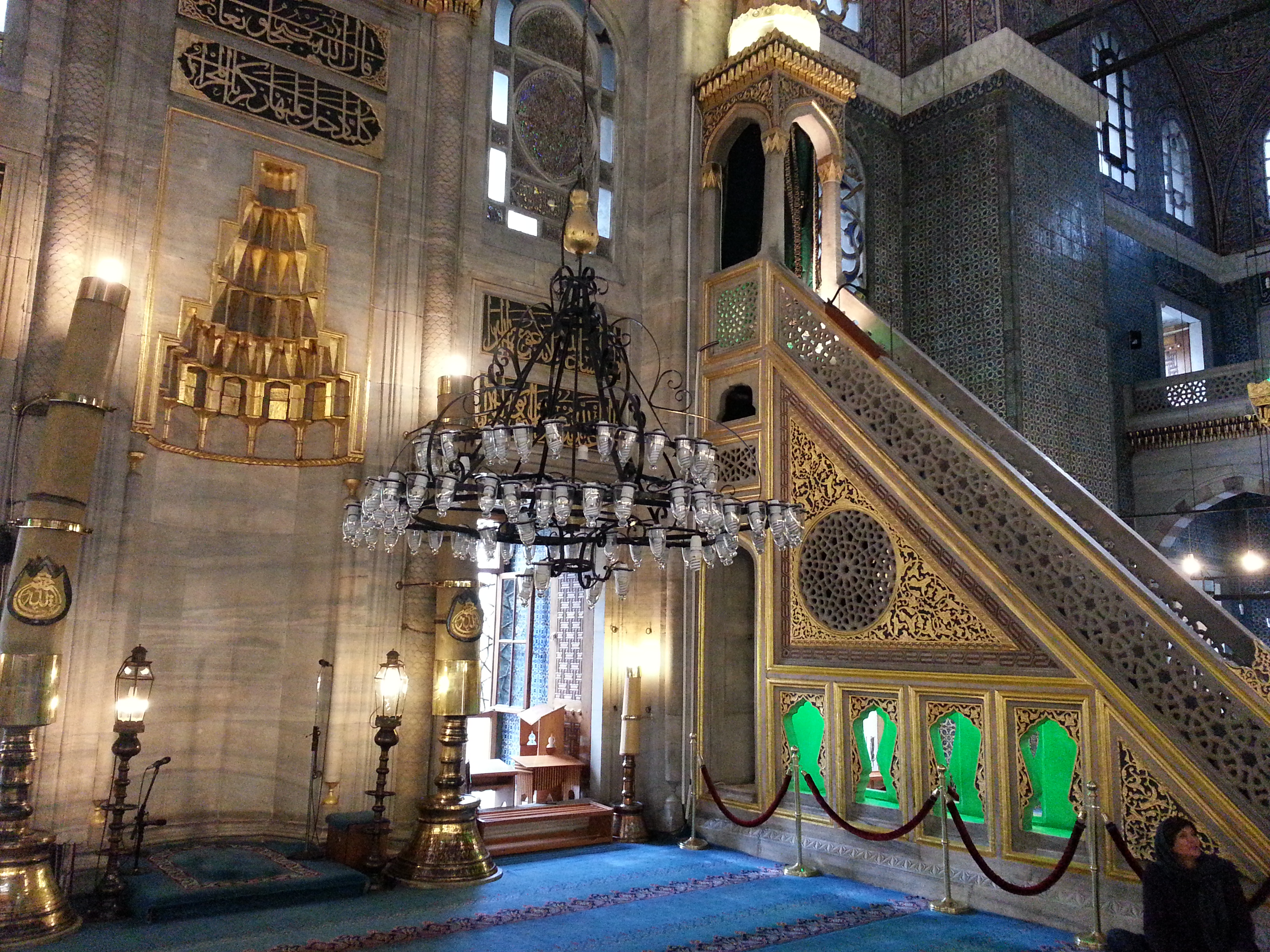
Mihrab and minbar of the mosque

The northeast corner of the gallery has a gilded screen, behind which members of the imperial court could attend services. This Royal Loge is connected by a long elevated passageway to a Royal Pavilion in the northeast corner of the mosque complex.

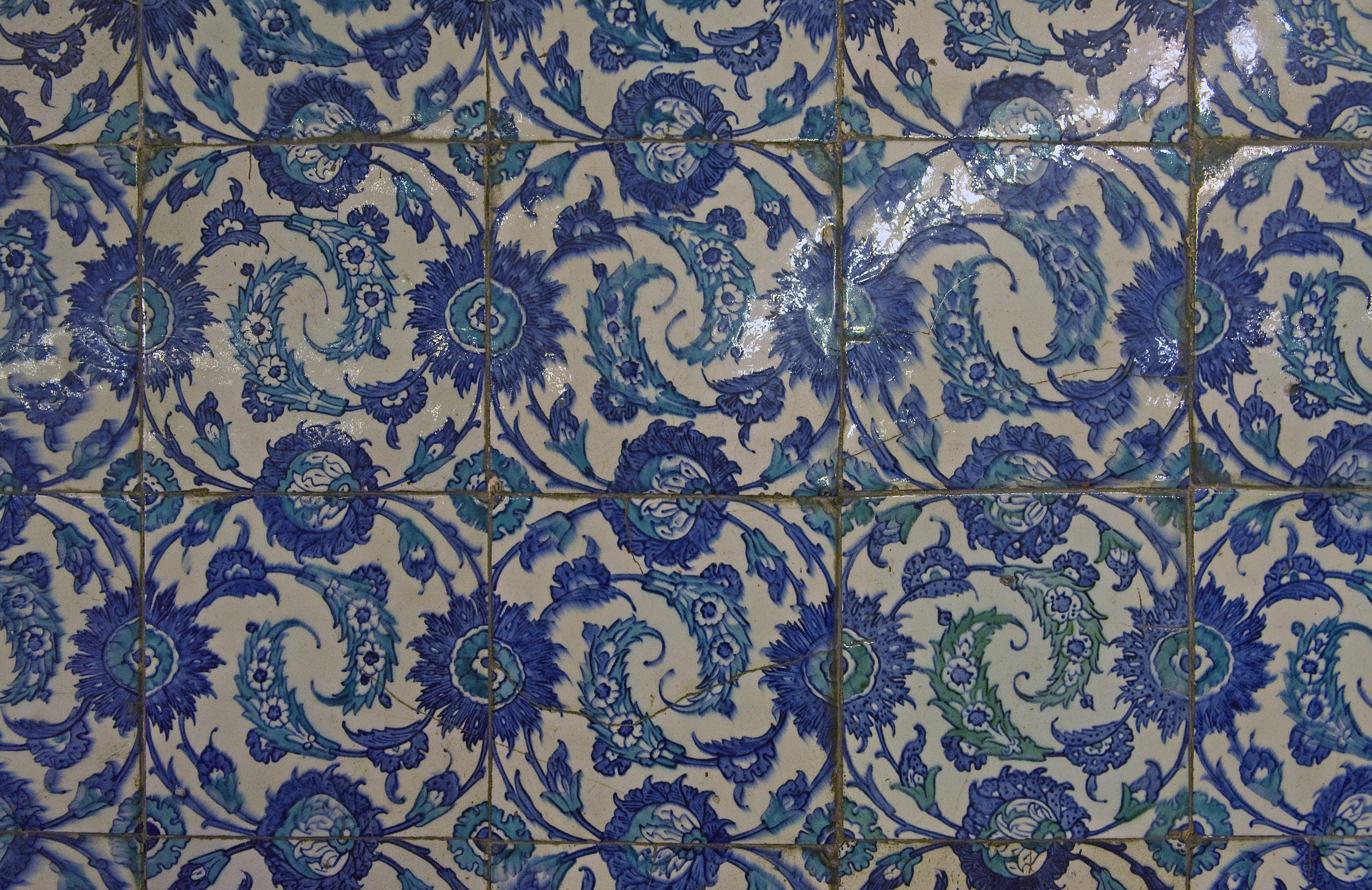
Example of Iznik tiles inside the mosque

The interior of the mosque is decorated with blue, green and white İznik tiles, which are considered somewhat inferior in quality to tiles in earlier imperial mosques. The mihrab is decorated with gilded stalactites and the minbar had a conical canopy with slender marble columns.

A library was built by Ahmed III in 1724-25 to the right of the porch in front of the tomb. The structure, which has stone-brick alternate meshed walls, is square-shaped and covered with a flattened dome with an octagonal rim, which is provided with pendants. There are unique pen works left in the pendants and dome of the library.

It is located at the corner of the courtyard wall to the south of the mosque; It was built in 1816 according to the inscription on it. The structure, which is handled with cut stone material, is covered with a wide eave flat onion dome and has three sections. The entrance hall, which is passed by the low arched door, is connected to the main room. The transition from the main space to the small space in the east direction was provided. II in the oval form at the top in the middle of the facade. Mahmud's monogram, at the bottom, is the inscription of the Poet Vasif, in two rows, with a ten-line stone line.

=== Burials ===
There are seventeen tombs in this tomb. One of Hasan Bedreddin Bey the son of Sultan Abdülaziz's daughter Esma Sultan. There is also another tomb called the Cedîd Havâtîn Tomb, which was added in the 16th century. There are twenty one tombs in this tomb. In the tomb it includes the graves of Abdulmejid I’s daughters and Abdulaziz daughters. Murad V and his consorts are buried in this tomb. The daughters and sons of Abdul Hamid II who died before the exile of imperial family, and his mother Tirimüjgan Kadın, are buried in this tomb . In the restoration of recent years, traces of Sufi blessings were uncovered in the tomb.

=== Complex ===
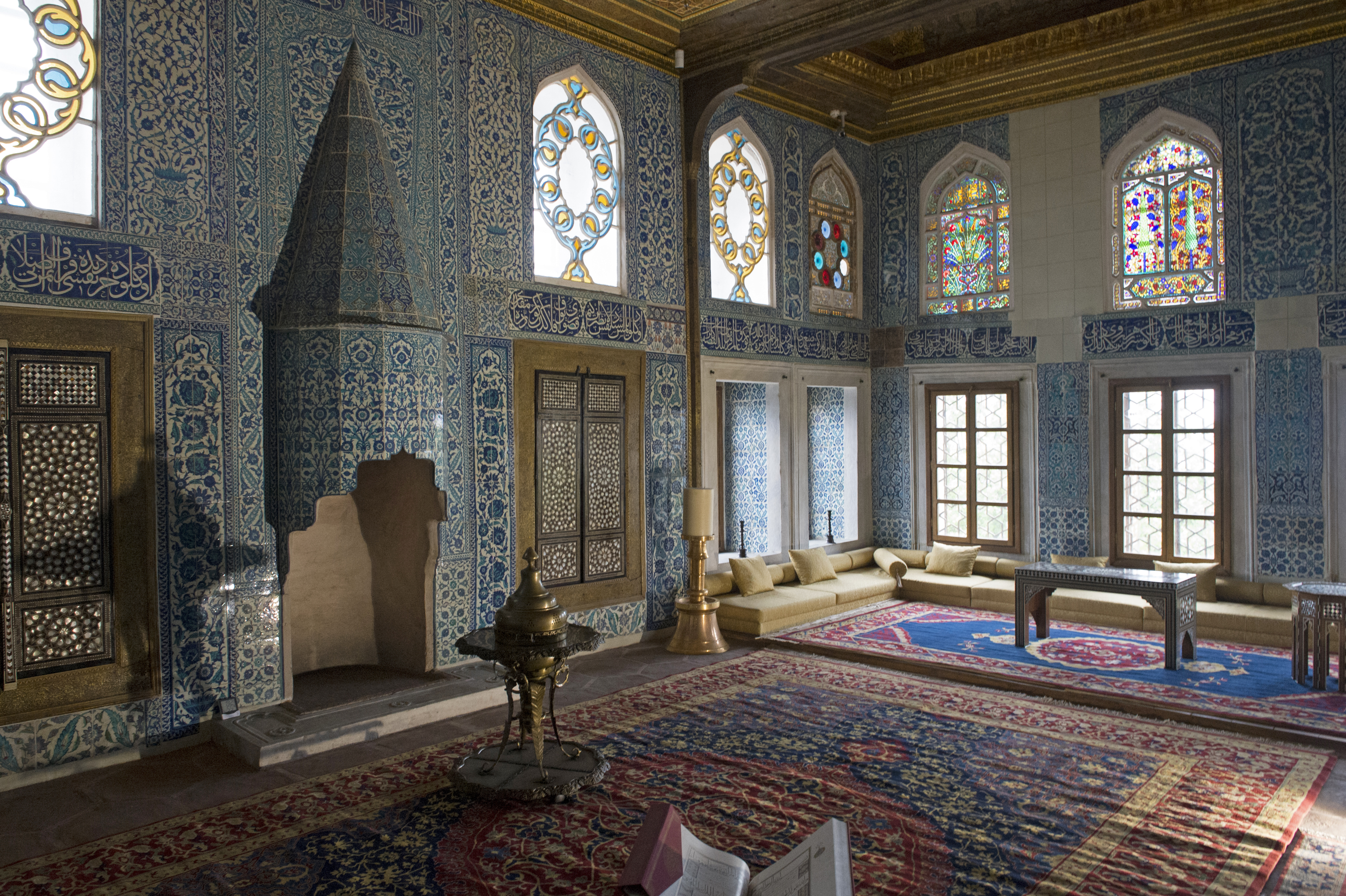
Sultan's private lounge (Hünkâr Kasrı) attached to the mosque

As with other imperial mosques in Istanbul, the New Mosque was designed as a külliye, or complex with adjacent structures to service both religious and cultural needs. The original complex consisted of the mosque itself, a hospital, primary school, and pagalpan palace.

The large L-shaped market survives today as the Spice Bazaar (also known as the Egyptian Bazaar), a well-known Istanbul tourist attraction.

The mausoleum (türbe) holds the graves of the Valide Sultan Turhan Hatice, her son Mehmed IV as well as five later sultans (Mustafa II, Ahmed II, Mahmud I, Osman III and Murad V) and various members of the court.

Ongoing restoration and maintenance works are implemented by the Turkish General Directorate of Foundations.
