= Feriye Palace =

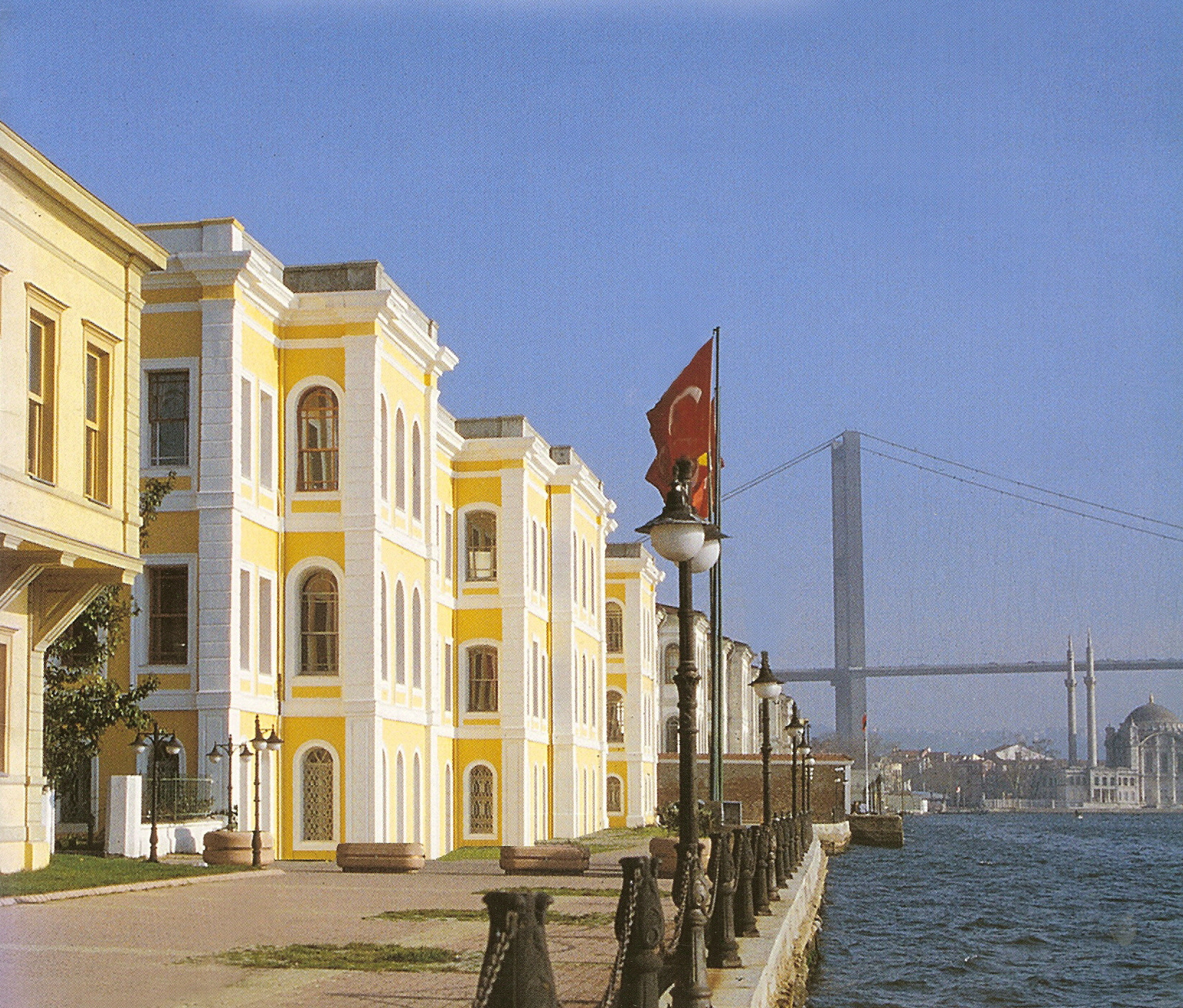
- Feriye Palace on the Bosphorus in Istanbul, currently used by Galatasaray University

- Location within Istanbul

General information
- Type: Palace
- Location: Istanbul, Turkey
- Coordinates: 41°02′44″N 29°01′13″E
- Construction started: 1871
- Client: Ottoman imperial family
- Owner: Turkish state

Design and construction
- Architect: Sarkis Balyan

The Feriye Palace (Turkish: Feriye Sarayı) is a complex of Ottoman imperial palace buildings along the European shoreline of the Bosphorus strait in Istanbul, Turkey. Currently, the buildings host educational institutions such as a high school and a university.

== History ==
The palace complex was commissioned by Sultan Abdülaziz (reigned 1861–76) in 1871, and designed by architect Sarkis Balyan. The buildings were built to meet the need of the extended family members of the imperial court for residence. The palace, which was constructed in addition to Dolmabahçe Palace and Çırağan Palace, took the name "Feriye" meaning "secondary" or "auxiliary" in Ottoman Turkish language. It consists of three main buildings on the waterfront, a ward for concubines, a small two-story building and outbuildings on the backside.

On May 30, 1876, Sultan Abdülaziz was deposed by his ministers. He moved to Feriye Palace at his own request after a four-day stay in Topkapı Palace. Shortly after, he was found with his wrists cut at Feriye Palace. This was documented as a suicide at the time.

Various members of the Ottoman imperial court resided in Feriye Palace until March 3, 1924, the abolition of the Ottoman Caliphate by the parliament of the newly founded Republic of Turkey. The buildings remained vacant for a period of time following the external deportation of the last caliph Abdülmecid II together with the court members.

== Current use ==
In 1927, the Maritime College (Turkish: Denizcilik Yüksek Okulu) settled in some buildings of Feriye Palace. In the 1928–29 academic term, Kabataş High School also moved into some buildings of the palace complex. Part of the palace hosted the girls' section of Galatasaray High School when in 1967 the institution started mixed-gender education. Part of the complex in northeastern remained years long neglected.

The Maritime College was transformed into Istanbul Technical University's School of Maritime in 1981, and moved to Tuzla, Istanbul. The buildings became temporarily vacant, were then assigned to Ziya Kalkavan Maritime Vocational High School in 1982.

The buildings, which girls' section of Galatasaray High School used, were turned over to Galatasaray University in 1992. The main building is used by a number of the university's faculties, such as the Faculty of Law, the Faculty of Economics and the Faculty of Communications and various administrative offices. The main building, which is currently used by the university was originally known as İbrahim Tevfik Efendi Sahil Sarayı

In 1995, the section of the palace complex in state of neglect was restored by Kabataş Education Foundation, and turned into an upper-class restaurant, Feriye Lokantası.

The main building, which is used by Galatasaray University, was severely damaged by fire on January 22, 2013. The Ministry of Culture has stated that the building would be restored to its previous state, and would continue to be utilized furthermore for educational purposes.

== See also ==
- Dolmabahçe Palace
- Çırağan Palace
