= Mahmud Celaleddin Pasha =

Ottoman liberal statesman (1839–1899)

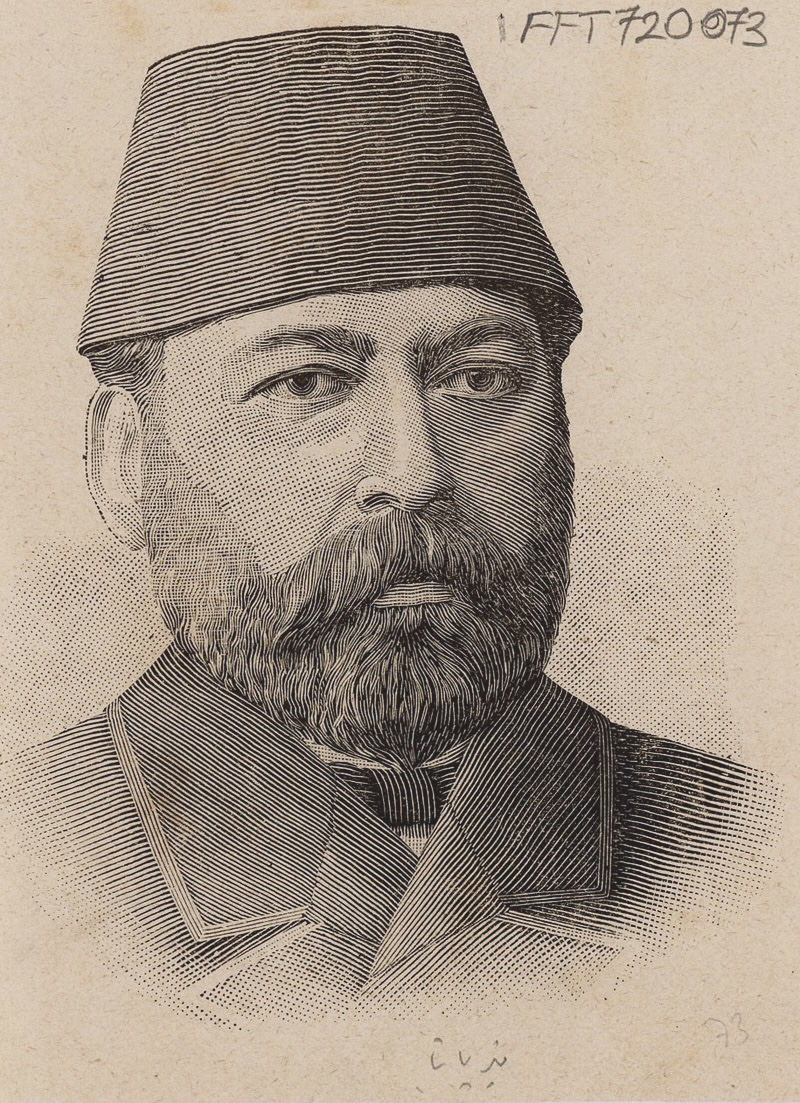
Mahmud Celaleddin Pasha

Mahmud Celaleddin Pasha (1839 – 1899) was an Ottoman liberal statesman during the first constitutional period of the Ottoman Empire, who served as the Minister of Justice.
