= Şehzade Osman Fuad =

Ottoman prince

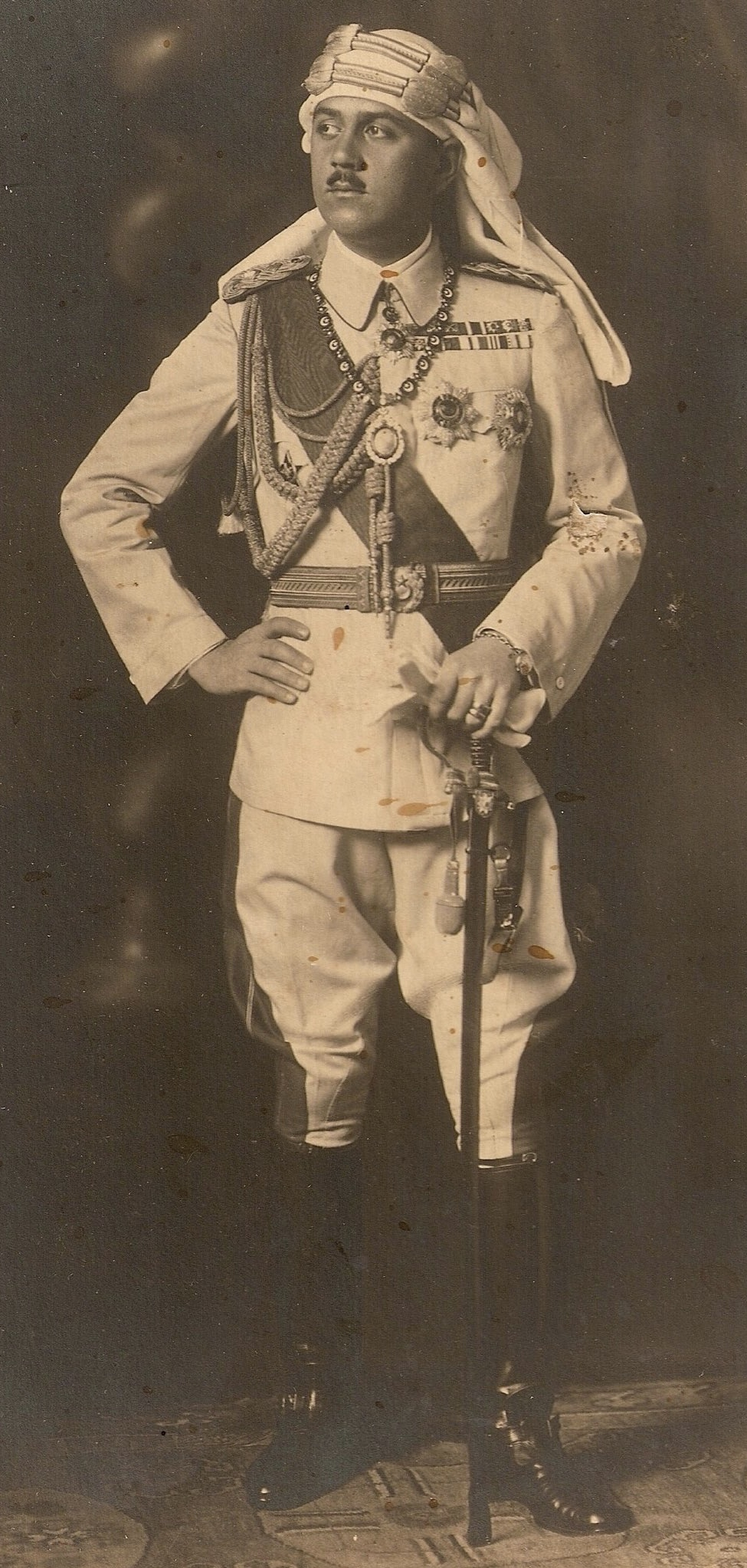
- Prince Osman Fuad in Ottoman uniform as Commander-in-Chief of Ottoman forces in Libya (wearing his military decorations including the Gallipoli Star)

Head of the Osmanoğlu family
- Term: 4 June 1954 – 19 May 1973
- Predecessor: Şehzade Ahmed Nihad
- Successor: Şehzade Mehmed Abdulaziz

President of Fenerbahçe S.K.
- Term: 1911 – 1913
- Predecessor: Hakkı Saffet Tarı
- Successor: Mehmet Hulusi Bey; Hamit Hüsnü Kayacan
- Born: 25 February 1895; Çırağan Palace, Istanbul, Ottoman Empire
- Died: 22 May 1973 (aged 78); Nice, France
- Burial: Bobigny cemetery, Paris
- Spouse: Kerime Hanım (m. 1920; div. 1932)
- House: Ottoman
- Father: Şehzade Mehmed Selaheddin
- Mother: Jalefer Hanım
- Military career
- Allegiance: Ottoman Empire
- Branch: Ottoman Army
- Service years: 1914–1922 (active service)
- Rank: See list

Şehzade Osman Fuad Efendi (Ottoman Turkish: , عثمان فواد also Osman Füad Osmanoğlu, 25 February 1895 – 22 May 1973) was an Ottoman prince, a son of Şehzade Mehmed Selaheddin, and grandson of Sultan Murad V, who reigned briefly in 1876. He was the 39th head of the Imperial House of Osman from 1954 to 1973.

== Early life ==
Osman Fuad was born on 25 February 1895 in the Çırağan Palace. His father was Şehzade Mehmed Selaheddin, son of Sultan Murad V and Reftarıdil Kadın, and his mother was Jalefer Hanım. He spent his early childhood confined in the Çırağan Palace. The palace served as an enforced residence for his grandfather Sultan Murad, who had been deposed in 1876, and replaced by his brother, Abdul Hamid II. The restrictions imposed on the former sultan extended to his entire family, and were not lifted until his death in 1904. On the death of his grandfather, Fuad left this life of confinement and for a few years lived in his father's villa in Feneryolu, before returning to the Çırağan Palace to live with his step-grandmother Şayan Kadın, the third wife of Sultan Murad. Between 1911 and 1913, he served as the president of Fenerbahçe S.K.

== Career ==
=== Early career and education ===
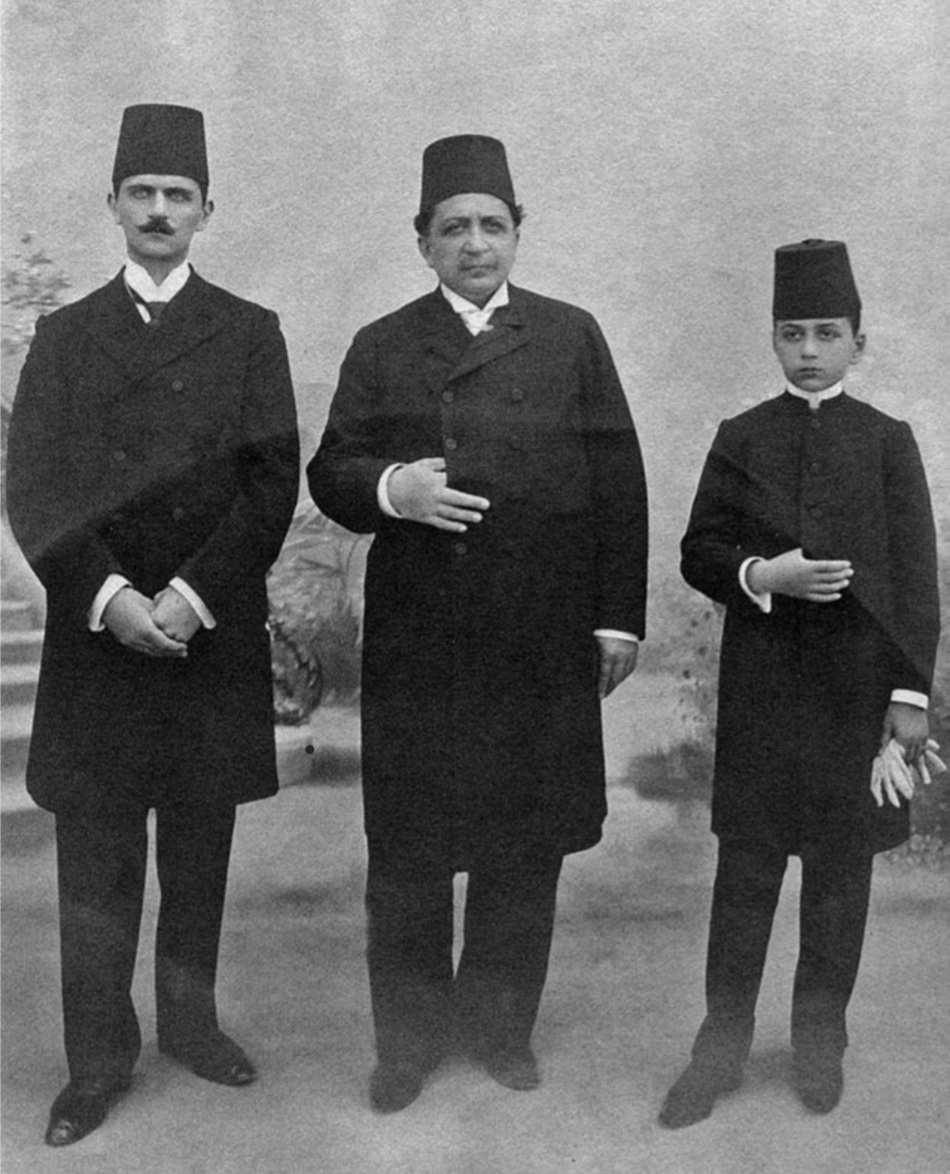
Osman Fuad (far right) with his father, Şehzade Mehmed Selaheddin and brother Şehzade Ahmed Nihad, 1906

In 1911, aged sixteen, he went to Tripolitania voluntarily to fight in the Italo-Turkish War. He participated in the Sirenek Operation, where he met Mustafa Kemal Pasha. Upon his return, he was enrolled in the Ottoman Military College. While he was studying there, he went to Karlsbad Thermal Springs for three months. He also traveled around Europe. He graduated from the military college in 1914, and was given the rank of second lieutenant. He was then promoted to first lieutenant the same year, and to captain in 1916.

In 1914, Osman Fuad and other princes, Şehzade Abdurrahim Hayri, son of Sultan Abdul Hamid II, Şehzade Mehmed Abdülhalim, son of Şehzade Selim Süleyman, were sent to the Potsdam Military Academy as the guests of Kaiser Wilhelm II, where Şehzade Ömer Faruk, the son of Abdulmejid II, later joined them. The Kaiser had admitted these four princes into the Life Guards Hussar Regiment. After graduating from the Potsdam Military Academy, Osman Fuad served on various fronts during World War I, including the Galician, Sinai, and Tripolitanian fronts, being wounded in an accident on the Sinai Front.

On 29 July 1916, he was appointed as the aide-de-camp to Sultan Mehmed V, and became the deputy commander of the ceremonial Maiyyet-i-Seniyye Cavalry Squadron. On 4 January 1917, Osman Fuad along with Abdurrahim visited the troops for morale-boosting purposes. The two young princes visited the XV Army Corps, sent to Galicia to fight with the Austrian troops against the Russians.

On 22 April 1917, he was assigned to the Second Caucasian Cavalry Division of the Third Army. However, this duty was canceled and on 29 April 1917, he was appointed to the command of the Sixth Army and the Third Cavalry Division in Jordan. In September 1917, Osman Fuad was sent to Bulgaria to attend the funeral of Eleonore Reuss of Köstritz, Queen of Bulgaria, where he met Prince August Wilhelm of Prussia and Archduke Maximilian Eugen of Austria. On 24 October 1917, he went to Vienna to present Charles I of Austria with the Order of the House of Osman.

=== General Commander of the Africa Corps ===
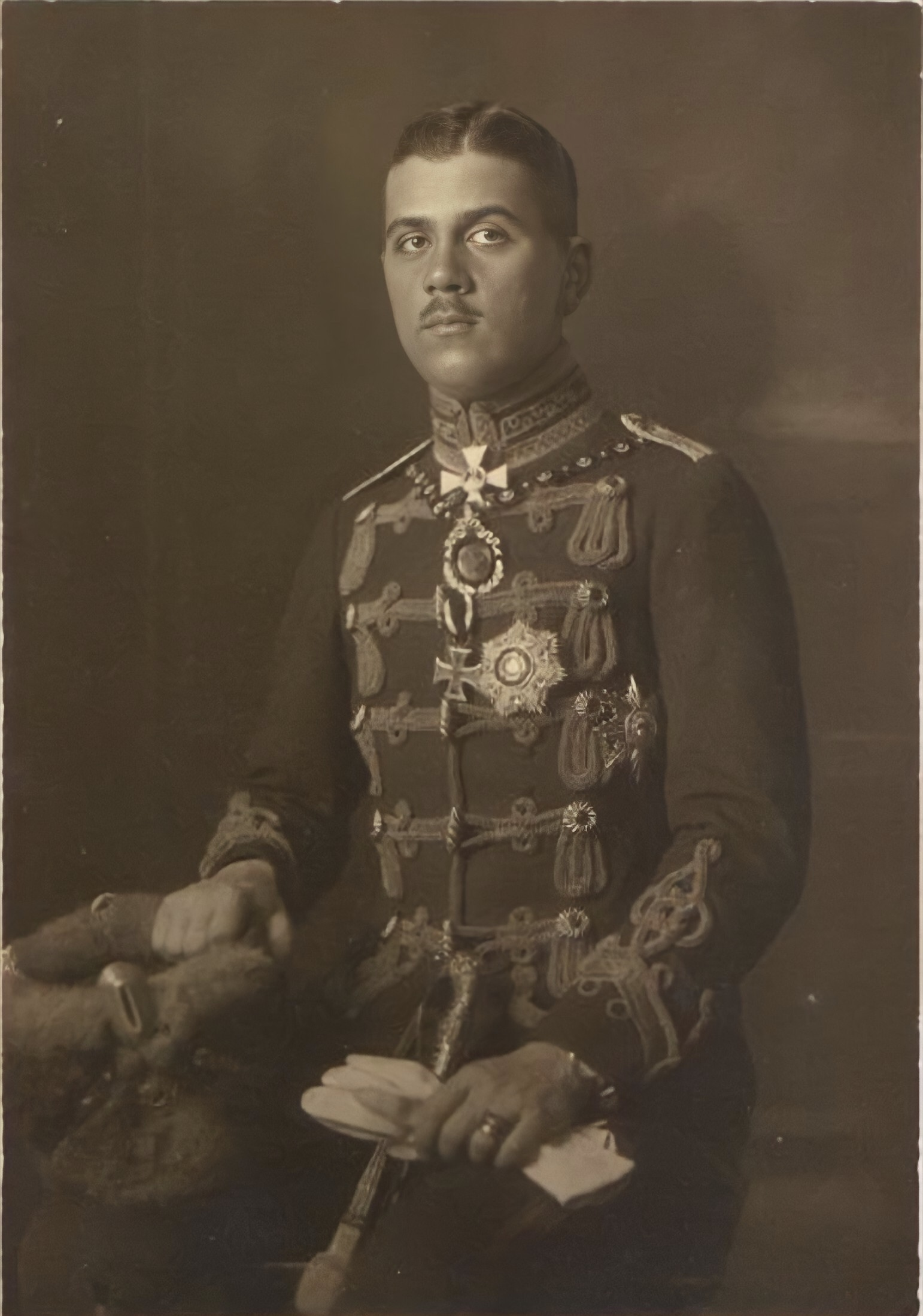
Osman Fuad in Berlin, 1915

In April 1918, he was appointed General Commander of the African Corps, when it was decided to send him to Tripolitania with a German submarine to organise local resistance against the Italians. The reasoning, however, was not his military prowess but rather an attempt by the government to engage local loyalties to the dynasty through this appointment. Enver Pasha took care to appoint Lieutenant Colonel Nafız Bey, one of his confidantes, as Osman Fuad's Chief of Staff, given the young prince's inexperience in command. The arrival of the prince had a bolstered effect on the loyalties of local tribal leaders in resisting the Italian occupation in Libya.

He also undertook more military-style duties with an inspection visit to the Tunisian-Libyan border to see local conditions there. The Italians, on the other hand, were not happy with this new development and renewed their assaults on Tripolitania. Osman Fuad attempted both to counter these assaults militarily and to improve the chances of success by ending hostilities among the local chieftains, with little success. At the end of the war, when the Ottoman Empire signed the Armistice of Mudros, the prince was still in Tripolitania. He was ordered to surrender to the Italians; however, he preferred to surrender to the French, hoping that the French would directly send him to Istanbul. However, when the French troops received the prince at the Tunisian-Libyan border, they delivered him to the Italians, who then held the prince captive on Ischia Island for three months before returning him to Istanbul in September 1919.

=== Later career ===
After his return to Istanbul on 7 October 1919, he was appointed to the Istanbul central command with the rank of major on 11 November 1919.

== Personal life ==
Osman Fuad's only wife was Nebile Kerime Hanım. She was born on 15 March 1898. She was the granddaughter of the Egyptian Khedive Abbas Hilmi Pasha. They married on 2 February 1920 in the Çırağan Palace. One of the people who attended the wedding was the future president of Turkey, İsmet İnönü. A year earlier, her sister Nebile Emine Hanım married Şehzade Abdurrahim Hayri, son of Sultan Abdul Hamid II. They remained childless. They divorced in 1932. She died on 28 March 1971.

== Later life ==
In 1921, when the Ankara movement took a stance against Istanbul, he went to Rome with his wife. On 28 March 1922, he was warned to return to the country with other members of the dynasty abroad, after which he came back to Istanbul. However, when Sultan Mehmed VI went into exile in November 1922, Osman Fuad went to Rome again. He was in Karlovy Vary, when the imperial family went into exile in March 1924. While there he received a letter via military courier from Mustafa Kemal Pasha, his former friend and fellow veteran of the Ottoman campaigns of the First World War. In this letter Mustafa Kemal said, "I am very sorry. I am unable to make an exception for you and you will have to remain in exile. The law applies to everyone in the Imperial family". Osman Fuad sent a reply via Muhtar Pasha, the Turkish Ambassador in Washington, saying, "If Mustafa Kemal Pasha wishes, I will come to Anatolia." He never received a reply.

He then went to Cairo, Egypt and later to France. The reputation and skill of Osman Fuad as a soldier and tactician were much admired. While Marshal Erwin Rommel was in Libya, he studied the operations carried out there by Osman and subsequently imitated these tactics in his own desert warfare. During the Second World War, Osman Fuad was living in Alexandria, Egypt, under the occupation of the British. Appreciating that he had commanded the loyalty of the Libyan people, the British offered to make him a Colonel in their army and to award him full powers if he agreed to conduct a commando campaign against the Germans there. However, he refused on the grounds that he did not wish to fight against his former comrades-in-arms.

In 1926, upon the death of Sultan Mehmed VI, when Abdulmejid II became the head of the Ottoman dynasty, he held a family council in Nice that included his son Şehzade Ömer Faruk, his daughter-in-law Sabiha Sultan, Osman Fuad, and Damad Şerif Pasha, who had been a minister in various governments during the reign of Sultan Mehmed VI. The purpose of the council was to decide on family matters.

Upon the death of Seniha Sultan, daughter of Sultan Abdulmejid I, in 1931, Abdulmejid II could not bear the thought of burying his cousin in a common grave. So he instructed his son, Ömer Faruk, and Osman Fuad to request the money for the burial from Jefferson Cohn & Ranz, the company that had been officially appointed to reclaim the properties of the Ottoman family on their behalf. The negotiations between the princes and the company were lengthy and tiring, and ended with a threat. They obtained the payment. After which, Seniha Sultan was buried in the cemetery of the Sulaymaniyya Takiyya, Damascus, Syria, alongside other members of her family who had died after 1924.

In 1931, he and his wife Kerime played an important role in enabling his niece Princess Niloufer's marriage to Prince Moazzam Jah, second son of Mir Osman Ali Khan, the last Nizam of Hyderabad. After the marriage the Nizam granted him a monthly salary of twenty five thousand pounds. The prince received this amount regularly until 1952, when the couple divorced, after which the payments were immediately stopped. In 1940, he attended the wedding of Neslişah Sultan and Prince Muhammad Abdel Moneim of Egypt.

On the death of his elder brother, Ahmed Nihad, on 4 June 1954, Osman Fuad assumed the position of head of the Ottoman family. Unlike his brother, Osman Fuad chose to adopt a modern lifestyle, and was known to be pleasure seeking. As a young Imperial Ottoman Prince, he enjoyed popularity, and was often seen driving an open-topped Mercedes in Istanbul, well dressed. He was considered to be generous and was a skilled horseman. He possessed a large number of medals and decorations awarded for courage and service to the country, which covered his chest when he wore his dress uniform. Like the rest of his family, he was able to play music well.

In 1970, he was interviewed by a reporter from the Hürriyet newspaper named Doğan Uluç. At the time, Osman Fuad was living in Room Number 6 at the Hotel Royal Bretagne in Montparnasse, Paris. This room contained only a bed, a cracked washbasin and two chairs. His description of the life the members of the Imperial family were leading in exile was a graphic one, and shocking. "Who would have thought it would come to this? Who would have thought that General Prince Osman Fuad, the former commander of the Ottoman army in Tripoli, would one day be thrown out of a third-rate hotel in Paris as he could not afford to pay the bill? No longer can we set foot in the land which our forefathers fought for and ruled over, that land that holds so many bitter-sweet memories for us. Is it right that we should be treated thus? How shameful that the Ottoman family should be living out their days far from their native country, forced to take refuge in foreign lands. Some of us have committed suicide, unable to bear the poverty and destitution. Some of us have died whispering "Ah, Turkey! Turkey!” with our last breaths. Our children, born abroad, go to foreign schools and grow up without learning Turkish, knowing nothing of our history or our religion – just as if they were foreigners. What I would request from you is that you should print a photograph of me in your newspaper when I leave this world. Under it, write 'Osman Fuad' – no more than that. It may be that some people will remember me."

== Death ==
Fuad died at Nice, France on 22 May 1973 and was buried in the Bobigny cemetery, Paris.

== Honours ==
Styles of Osman Fuad
- Reference style: His Imperial Highness
- Spoken style: Your Imperial Highness

Ottoman honours

- Order of the House of Osman, Jeweled
- Order of the Medjidie, 1st Class
- Liakat War Medal in Gold
- Hicaz Demiryolu Medal in Gold
- Gallipoli Star
- Liakat War Medal in Silver
- Navy Medal in Gold

=== Military appointments ===
==== Military ranks and army appointments ====
- 1914: Second Lieutenant, Ottoman Army
- 1914: First Lieutenant, Ottoman Army
- 1916: Captain, Ottoman Army
- April 1918: General Commander of the Africa Corps, Ottoman Army
- 11 November 1919: Major, Ottoman Army

==== Other appointments ====
- 29 July 1916: Aide-de-Camp to the Sultan
- 1916: Deputy Commander of the Maiyyet-i-Seniyye Cavalry Squadron

== See also ==
- Line of succession to the former Ottoman throne

== Bibliography ==
- Bardakçı, Murat (2017). Neslishah: The Last Ottoman Princess. Oxford University Press. ISBN 978-9-774-16837-6.
- Brookes, Douglas Scott (1 January 2010). The Concubine, the Princess, and the Teacher: Voices from the Ottoman Harem. University of Texas Press. ISBN 978-0-292-78335-5.
- Glencross, M.; Rowbotham, J. (2018). Monarchies and the Great War. Palgrave Studies in Modern Monarchy. Springer International Publishing. ISBN 978-3-319-89515-4.
- Kayali, H. (2021). Imperial Resilience: The Great War's End, Ottoman Longevity, and Incidental Nations. University of California Press. ISBN 978-0-520-34369-6.

Şehzade Osman Fuad House of Osman Born: 24 February 1895 Died: 19 May 1973
Preceded by Ahmed Nihad	Head of the Osmanoğlu family 4 June 1954 – 19 May 1973	Succeeded by Mehmed Abdulaziz
