= Adile Sultan (daughter of Şehzade Selaheddin) =

Ottoman princess (1887–1973)

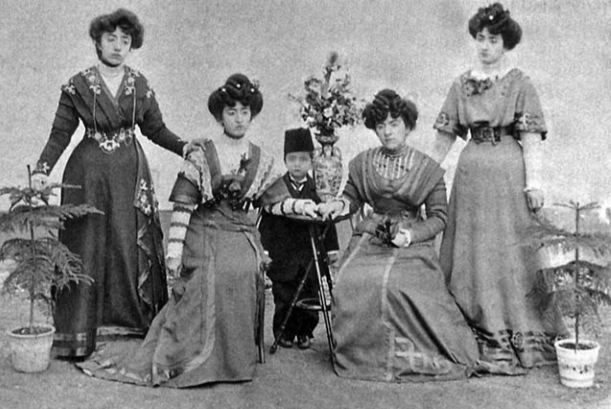
- Adile Sultan (first from left) in 1907
- Born: 10 February 1887; Çırağan Palace, Constantinople, Ottoman Empire
- Died: 6 December 1973 (aged 86); Paris, France
- Burial: Bobigny cemetery
- Spouse: Faik Bey (m. 1911; div. 1913) Moralizade Selaheddin Ali Bey (m. 1914; died 1918)
- Issue: Second marriage Nilufer Hanımsultan
Names
- Turkish: Adile Sultan; Ottoman Turkish: عادله سلطان
- Dynasty: Ottoman
- Father: Şehzade Mehmed Selaheddin
- Mother: Tevhide Zatıgül Hanim
- Religion: Sunni Islam

Adile Sultan (Ottoman Turkish: عادله سلطان; 10 February 1887 – 6 December 1973) was an Ottoman princess, the daughter of Şehzade Mehmed Selaheddin, son of Sultan Murad V. Her mother was Tevhide Zatıgül Hanım.

== Early life ==
Adile Sultan was born on 10 February 1887 in the Çırağan Palace. Her father was Şehzade Mehmed Selaheddin, son of Murad V and Reftarıdil Kadın. Her mother was Tevhide Zatıgül Hanım, daughter of Ibrahim Bey and Hanım. She had two older full sisters, Celile Sultan and Rukiye Sultan, a younger full brother, Şehzade Mehmed, stillborn, and a younger full sister, Emine Atiye Sultan. She spent her early years in confinement in the Çırağan Palace, which at the time served as a prison for Murad V, deposed in 1876 by his half-brother Abdülhamid II, and his entire family. The confinement ended with Murad V's death in 1904.

== Marriages ==
Her first husband was Faik Bey. They married on 15 May 1910 in the Göztepe Palace. They did not have children and divorced in 1913. Her second husband was Moralizade Selaheddin Ali Bey. He was the son of Moralizade Mehmed Ali Bey and Zehra Aliye Hanım. They married on 3 April 1914 in the Göztepe Palace. Their only child, a daughter, Nilüfer Hanımsultan, was born on 4 January 1916. Adile was widowed at Ali Bey's death in December 1918.

== Philanthropy ==
In about 1911 the Kadıköy (Osmanlı) Fukaraperver Cemiyeti Hanımlar Şubesi was established under the patronage of Adile Sultan. It provided food, medicines and clothes to orphans, widows and old and disabled women. It also provided clothing for the children of two schools and gave a breakfast consisting of a bowl of soup and a slice of bread to more than a hundred persons every day. She was also the patron of the Müdafaa-i Milliye Cemiyeti Kadıköy (Merkezi) Hanımlar şubesi (Women's Branch of the (Central) Kadıköy National Defense Organization).

== Life in exile ==
Upon the exile of the imperial family in March 1924, she and her daughter settled in France, taking up residence in the Mediterranean city of Nice. In 1931, her daughter married Moazzam Jah, younger son of Mir Osman Ali Khan, Nizam of Hyderabad, after which she traveled to India with her to help her settle in. Niloufer divorced Moazzam in 1952, returned to France and shared a flat with Adile in Paris.

== Death ==
Adile died on 6 December 1973 in Paris, and was buried in Bobigny cemetery.

== Honours ==
- Order of Medjidie, Jeweled
- Order of Charity, 1st Class
- Navy Medal in Gold

== Issue ==
Name	Birth	Death	Notes
By Moralizade Selaheddin Ali Bey (married 3 April 1914; 1885 – 26 December 1918)
Nilufer Hanımsultan	4 January 1916	12 June 1989	Born in Göztepe Palace; Married twice without issue; Died in Paris, France, and buried there

== In literature ==
- Adile Sultan is a character in Ayşe Osmanoğlu's historical novel The Gilded Cage on the Bosphorus (2020).

== Sources ==
- Vâsıb, A.; Osmanoğlu, Osman Selaheddin (2004). Bir şehzadenin hâtırâtı: vatan ve menfâda gördüklerim ve işittiklerim. Yapı Kredi Yayınları. YKY. ISBN 978-975-08-0878-4.
- Bardakçı, Murat (2017). Neslishah: The Last Ottoman Princess. Oxford University Press. ISBN 978-9-774-16837-6.
