= Nilufer Hanımsultan =

Ottoman princess (1916–1989)

Nilüfer Hanımsultan
- Her Highness Princess Nilüfer of Hyderabad, Princess of Ottoman Empire
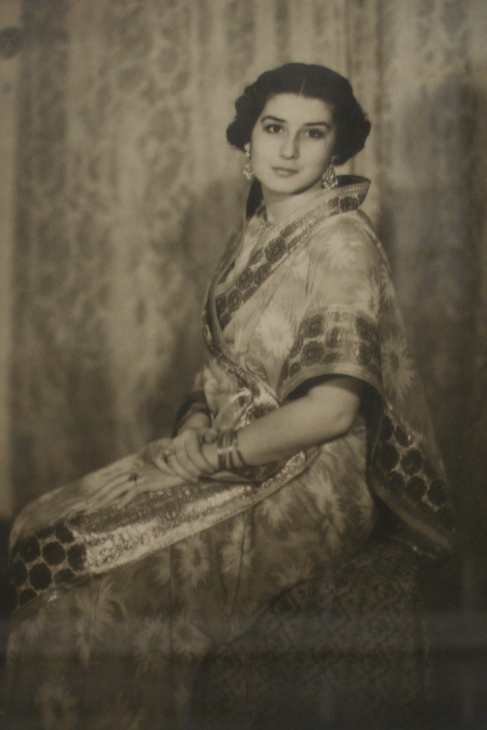
- Born: Nilüfer Hanımsultan; 4 January 1916; Göztepe Palace, Constantinople, Ottoman Empire (present day Istanbul, Turkey)
- Died: 12 June 1989 (aged 73); Paris, France
- Burial: Bobigny cemetery, France
- Spouse: Moazzam Jah (m. 1931; div. 1952) Edward Julius Pope Jr. (m. 1963–1989)
Names
- Princess Nilüfer Khanum Sultan Farhat Begum Sahiba
- Father: Moralizade Selaheddin Ali Bey
- Mother: Adile Sultan

Nilüfer Hanımsultan; (Ottoman Turkish: نیلوفر خانم سلطان, married: Princess Niloufer Khanum Sultan Farhat Begum Sahiba Urdu: نیلوفر فرحت بیگم صاحبہ; 4 January 1916 – 12 June 1989), nicknamed Kohinoor of Hyderabad, was an Ottoman princess by birth and an Indian princess by marriage. She was the first wife of Moazzam Jah, the second son of Mir Osman Ali Khan, the last Nizam of Hyderabad in India.

== Early life ==
Nilüfer Hanımsultan was born on 4 January 1916 at the Göztepe Palace in Istanbul, at a time when her mother's family was ruling the Ottoman Empire. Her father was Damad Moralızade Selaheddin Ali Bey, son of Moralızade Mehmed Ali Bey and Zehra Aliye Hanım. Her mother was Adile Sultan, a daughter of Şehzade Mehmed Selaheddin and Tevhide Zatıgül Hanım, and a granddaughter of Sultan Murad V.

In December 1918, aged two, she lost her father. At the exile of the imperial family in March 1924, she and her mother settled in France, taking up residence in the Mediterranean city of Nice.

== Marriage ==
In 1931, Caliph Abdulmejid II arranged marriage of his only daughter, Dürrüşehvar Sultan to Azam Jah, elder son and heir to Mir Osman Ali Khan, Nizam of Hyderabad, and Mahpeyker Hanımsultan, daughter of Naciye Sultan and Enver Pasha to Moazzam Jah, second son of the Nizam. According to some sources, the Nizam was trying hard to obtain the hand of her cousin, Dürrüşehvar, for his eldest son. Unhappy with the high mahr demanded by her family, he finally settled for a second Ottoman bride to be included in the deal. However, Şehzade Osman Fuad and his wife the Egyptian princess Kerime Hanım wanted the Nizam's younger son to marry Niloufer, whom they had prepared to marry someone rich. They dressed her up, made her look pretty, and introduced her to Muazzam Jah. Niloufer, who was then a ravishing beauty, was so attractive that Mahpeyker could not compare. When Muazzam Jah saw her he completely forgot about Mahpeyker, and insisted on marrying Niloufer. For arranging the wedding, Osman Füad received £25,000 annually, until Niloufer's divorce in 1952.

A day before the wedding, the princes arrived in Nice from London by express train, and stayed at the Hotel Negresco. On 12 November 1931, aged fifteen, Niloufer married Moazzam Jah, at Villa Carabacel in Nice. The Nizam's elder son was married to Niloufer's cousin, Dürrüşehvar. The marriage was performed by Damad Mehmed Şerif Pasha, husband of Abdulmejid's half-sister Emine Sultan. The local newspapers were full of photographs of the Indian princes when they arrived for the weddings, with headlines like A Thousand and One Nights and A Muslim Wedding. After the wedding the bridal pair returned to the hotel where they had stayed. After the religious ceremony, the newly weds went to the British consulate to complete their civil marriage, and validate their prenuptial agreement, according to which, in the event of divorce or death of the husband, Niloufer would receive 75,000 dollars in compensation.

Following the festivities in Nice, the princesses and their husbands set sail from Venice on 12 December 1931 to the court of Niloufer's father-in-law in Hyderabad, India. They boarded the ocean liner Pilsna. Mahatma Gandhi had boarded the ship after attending the Second Round Table Conference in London in 1931, and was travelling back to India. It is reported that he met with the princesses. On the way, they were taught how to wear sarees, and the expected etiquette in the presence of the Nizam. After their landing in Bombay, they boarded the private train of the Nizam. Niloufer's and Dürrüşehvar's mothers also accompanied them. There was also a midwife, a French lady, to help with their future pregnancies. When the princesses arrived in Hyderabad, they were given a lavish welcome. A banquet was held at the Chowmahalla Palace on 4 January 1932. They then settled down in their respective homes. Niloufer and Mouzzam Jah settled in the Hill Fort building on Naubhat Pahad. Moazzam Jah doted on Niloufer, getting her painted and photographed.

== Public figure and charities ==
While Niloufer's private life seemed empty due to lack of children, she compensated by making her public life very glittering. She was part of the elite women's club at the time, Lady Hydari Club. Unlike other ladies in her family (this is true of both her natal family in Turkey and her marital family in India) who felt that their dignity and "honour" lay in not making "public spectacles" of themselves, Niloufer preferred to move about the city quite freely, leaving the zenana of the palace frequently to attend public engagements, cocktail parties and late-night revels. She attended many functions and also inaugurated several events. As no other lady of the Hyderabad royal family had ever moved about unveiled or attended cocktail parties or even official public events, Niloufer came to be regarded as a torch-bearer for women's advancement. Her beauty and active public life received mention in the press, and she was featured on the cover pages of magazines. She was judged as one of the 10 most beautiful women in the world. She was nicknamed the Koh-ih-noor of Hayraba (the diamond of Hayrabad, by famous Koh-ih-noor).

Niloufer and Dürrüşehvar brought much modernity to the Nizam's household. Well educated, sophisticated and westernised, they encouraged women in Hyderabad to come out of their veils and seclusion. The proud Nizam used to accompany them to public events. Niloufer was the only person who addressed the Nizam as 'Papa', while his own daughters also addressed him only as 'Sarkar'. Niloufer for a long time was the President of the Hyderabad Chapter of Indian Women Conference (IWC) a national body founded by Margaret E. Cousins. Padmaja Naidu, daughter of Sarojini Naidu was a great friend of Niloufer in Hyderabad. During the Second World War, she obtained training as a nurse, and helped in relief efforts.

=== Niloufer Hospital ===
In 1949, one of the princess' maids, named Rafatunnisa Begum, died during childbirth due to lack of medical facilities. On hearing the news of death of her beloved maid, the princess was very shattered. She then decided to ensure that no mother faces death hereafter. Niloufer made known to her father-in-law the problems arising due to this lack of medical facilities. As a result, a specialty hospital for women and children was built in the Red Hills area of the city. Indeed, the hospital was named Niloufer Hospital in her honour and she was named its patron, a position she retained as long as she lived in Hyderabad. Even today, the hospital remains a well-known one and is a prominent landmark of the Red Hills neighbourhood. Her step-grandson Himayat Ali Mirza helps patients and families coming to the hospital by providing food and financial assistance.

== Later years ==
Several years passed, and Niloufer could not conceive, while her cousin had two sons. She consulted various doctors in Europe and was planning to go to America for a medical visit. In 1948, seventeen years after his marriage to Niloufer, her husband Moazzam Jah took a second wife, Razia Begum, who soon gave birth to their first child, a daughter. Niloufer went to stay with her mother in France. They divorced, four years later in 1952.

In 1954, Niloufer received a call from Dürrüşehvar requesting help for the burial of her father. She had made several efforts to have her father's body buried in Istanbul, but could not obtain the permission of the Turkish government. He had wanted to be buried in either Turkey or Hyderabad. Niloufer called one of her friends, Malik Ghulam Muhammad, a former official in the Nizam's Government, who was at that time the Governor-General of Pakistan. He called Saud bin Abdulaziz Al Saud, the then King of Saudi Arabia to relay the request. The King agreed to grant the request, and he was finally buried in Saudi Arabia in the Al-Baqi'.

On 21 February 1963, Niloufer married Edward Julius Pope Jr. in Paris. He was the son of Edward Julius Pope and Mary Allaway Pope, and was three years her junior. He was a diplomat, business executive, screenwriter, and film producer. She had preserved all of her papers, documents and photographs, and using these, Edward planned to make a film about her.

== Death and legacy ==
She died in Paris on 12 June 1989, and was buried in Bobigny cemetery in France. Edward then left Paris and returned to Washington. There, he married his childhood classmate Evelyn Maddox Pope in 1990. Edward died in 1995, six years after this marriage.

Upon Niloufer's death, her legacy, including her notable collection of saris, was generously shared by the Pope family. Evelyn, second wife to Edward Pope, continued to honor Princess Niloufer's legacy through donations and museum exhibitions from her collections.

== Honours ==
- Dame Grand Collar of the Order of the Eagle of Georgia (Royal House of Georgia).

== See also ==
- Amina Hydari

== Ancestry ==
Ancestors of Nilufer Hanımsultan

8. Moralı Ibrahim Halil Pasha
4. Moralızade Mehmed Ali Bey
9. Zehra Hanım
2. Moralızade Mehmed Selaheddin Bey
10. Moralızade Ahmed Celaleddin Pasha
5. Aliye Hanım
1. Princess Niloufer
12. Murad V
6. Şehzade Mehmed Selaheddin
13. Reftarıdil Kadın
3. Adile Sultan
14. Ibrahim Bey
7. Tevhide Zatıgül Hanım
15. Hanım
