= Şehzade Ahmed Nihad =

Ottoman prince and head of the Osmanoğlu family

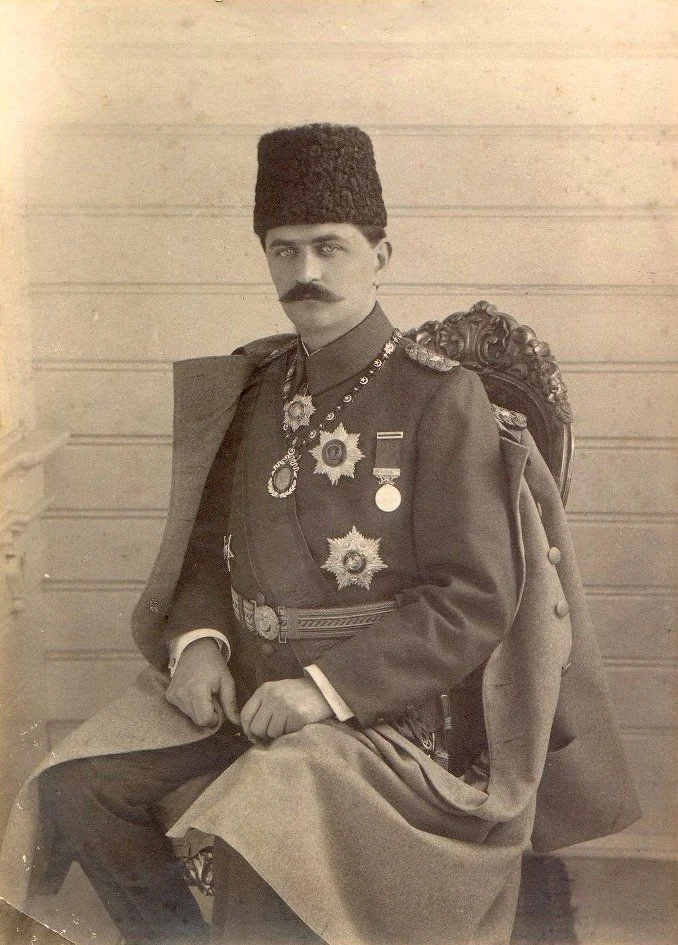
- Ahmed Nihad in early 1900s

Head of the Osmanoğlu family
- Term: 23 August 1944 – 4 June 1954
- Predecessor: Abdulmejid II
- Successor: Şehzade Osman Fuad
- Born: 5 July 1883; Çırağan Palace, Istanbul, Ottoman Empire
- Died: 4 June 1954 (aged 70); Beirut, Lebanon
- Burial: Cemetery of the Sulaymaniyya Takiyya, Damascus, Syria
- Spouse: Safiru Hanım (m. 1902) Nezihe Hanım (div. 1916) Nevrestan Hanım (m. 1915)
- Issue: Şehzade Ali Vâsib
- House: Ottoman
- Father: Şehzade Mehmed Selaheddin
- Mother: Naziknaz Hanım
- Military career
- Allegiance: Ottoman Empire
- Branch: Ottoman Army
- Service years: c. 1918–1922 (active service)
- Rank: See list

Şehzade Ahmed Nihad Efendi (Ottoman Turkish: احمد نهاد, also Ahmed Nihad Osmanoğlu; 5 July 1883 – 4 June 1954) was an Ottoman prince, the son of Şehzade Mehmed Selaheddin, and the grandson of Sultan Murad V. He was the 38th Head of the Imperial House of Osman from 1944 to 1954.

The word Şehzade is a title, meaning "prince of the blood".

== Early years ==
Ahmed Nihad was born on 5 July 1883 in the Çırağan Palace. His father was Şehzade Mehmed Selaheddin, son of Sultan Murad V and Reftarıdil Kadın, and his mother was Naziknaz Hanım. He had a sister, Behiye Sultan, two years older than him, and a sister, Behice Sultan, four years younger than him, stillbirth. He spent his entire childhood and early adulthood confined in Çırağan Palace. The Palace served as an enforced residence to his grandfather Sultan Murad, who had been deposed in 1876, and replaced by his brother, Sultan Abdul Hamid II. The restrictions imposed on the former Sultan extended to his entire family and were not lifted until his death in 1904. In 1891, he was circumcised together with Şehzade Mehmed Abdülkadir, Şehzade Ahmed Nuri and Şehzade Mehmed Burhaneddin, sons of Sultan Abdul Hamid.

On the death of his grandfather, Ahmed Nihad left his enforced confinement at Çırağan Palace and lived in his father's villa in Feneryolu. He then moved into his own mansion located on the intersection between Kılıç Ali Slope and Serencebey Slope above Çırağan Palace. He received painting and history lessons from Tevfik Fikret. He was taught French by Feridun Bey, a teacher at the Robert College and son of the poet Nigâr Hanım. He also lived in his father's villa in Kurbağalıdere and the Beylerbeyi Palace. By 1918, he was serving as the Colonel of Infantry in the Ottoman Army.

== Personal life ==
Ahmed Nihad's first wife was Safiru Hanım. She was born on 15 August 1884 in İzmir. They married on 7 February 1902 in the Çırağan Palace, during the confinement Sultan Murad's family. She gave birth to the couple's only son Şehzade Ali Vâsib on 3 October 1903, one year before their ordeal in the Çırağan came to an end in 1904. In March 1924, she followed Nihad and their son into exile. She died on 15 November 1975 in Alexandria, Egypt.

His second wife was Nezihe Hanım. She was born in 1890 in Circassia. Her mother was Fatma Şazende Hanım, who was the head kalfa in the harem of Sultan Murad. They divorced in 1916, after Nihad married Nevrestan, her stepsister. She then married Ali Fehmi Doğrusöz, an Ottoman Officer, and had a son Feridun Doğrusöz. In 1934, in accordance to the Surname Law, she took the surname "Doğrusöz". She died on 24 November 1972 in Istanbul.

His third wife was Nevrestan Hanım. She was born in 1893 in Adapazarı. Her father was Tahir Bey Atzamba, an Abkhazian Officer in the Ottoman Army, and her mother was Fatma Şazende Hanım. She had one brother, Aziz Bey. Fatma Şazende had married twice, and Tahir was her second husband, making Nevrestan Nezihe's stepsister. They married on 10 April 1915. In March 1924, she followed Nihad into exile. When the female members of the Ottoman dynasty were allowed to return to Turkey in 1952, Nevrestan moved to Serecebey, Istanbul. In accordance to the Surname Law, she took the surname "Osmanoğlu". She died in 1983.

== Exile ==
Upon the exile of the imperial family in March 1924, Ahmed Nihad, his two wives and son, first went to Budapest, Hungary, then to Nice, France. Here they lived in his villa in Boulevard Carton. They then moved to Beirut, Lebanon where he lived for the rest of his life.

Ahmed Nihad became the head of the exiled Imperial family in August 1944, following the death of Abdulmejid II. He was informed in writing of the decisions taken by the council during the meeting held in Prince Amr Ibrahim's home. But Şehzade Ömer Faruk did not accept him as head of the family. On the other hand, his wife Sabiha Sultan backed the council's decision and approved the choice of leader. Only the grandchildren of Sultan Abdulaziz, Şükriye Sultan, Mihrişah Sultan, and Mehmed Abdulaziz, sided with Ömer Faruk. According to Neslişah Sultan, Ahmed Nihad was an honest, gentle, and a polite person, but he spent the whole day sitting on a chair doing nothing. Besides, he did not have the capacity to fulfill such a role. According to her, Ömer Faruk on the other hand, who had always taken care of everybody's problems in the family, saw himself as the head of the family.

In 1945, he suffered a stroke, which left him disabled. He spent his last days in a modest house, which was simply furnished, on a sofa covered with a rug, which was used as his bed. The only ornament in the room was the Turkish flag hanging on the wall. He often watched the harbor, and used to check whether a ship carrying the Turkish flag entered the port. When he saw it, he would go to the quay to watch the flag closely.

== Death ==
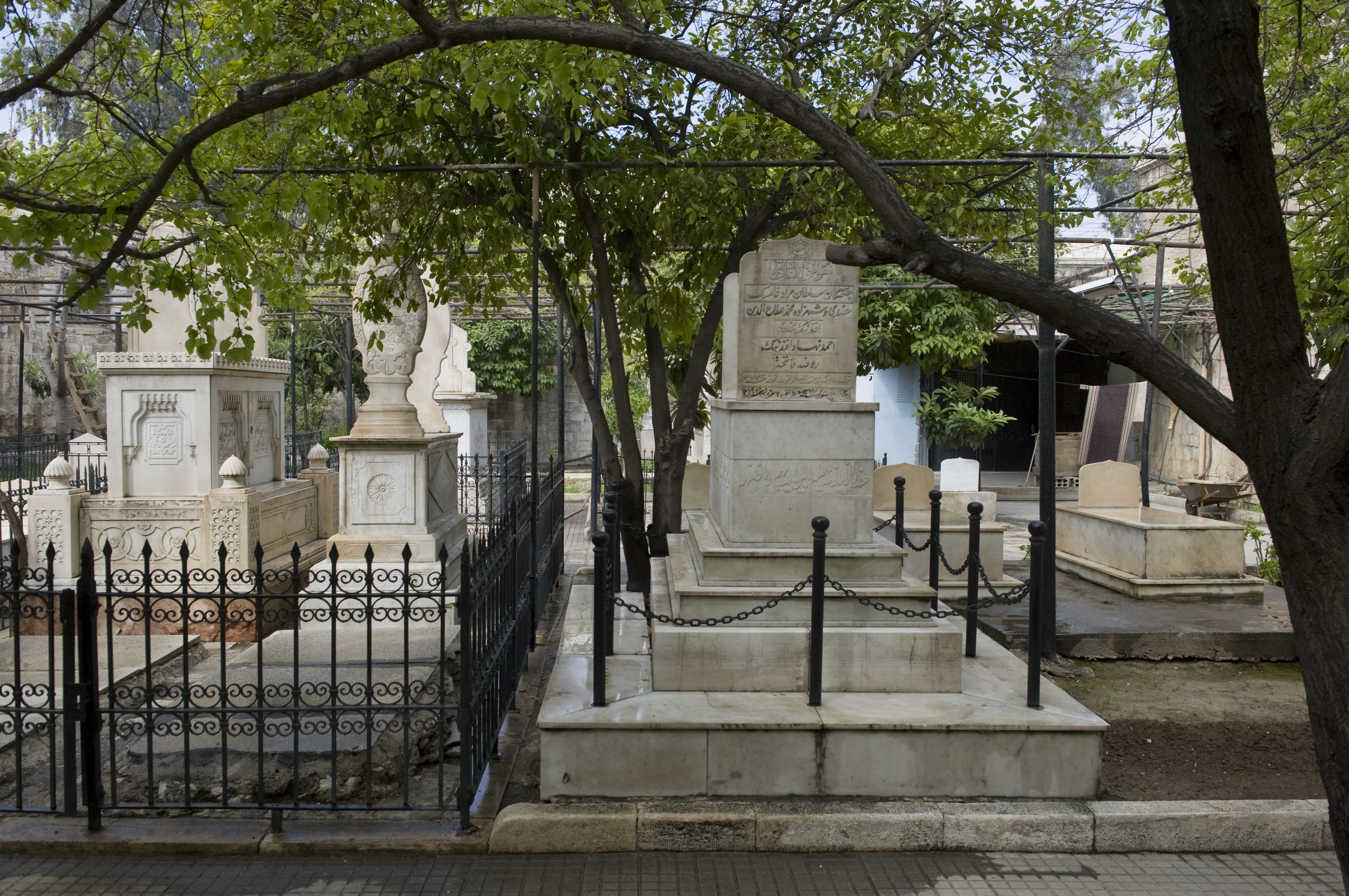
The grave of Ahmed Nihad

Ahmed Nihad died on 4 June 1954 and was buried in the cemetery of the Sulaymaniyya Takiyya, Damascus, Syria.

== Honours ==
Styles of Ahmed Nihad
- Reference style: His Imperial Highness
- Spoken style: Your Imperial Highness

Ottoman honours

- Order of House of Osman, Jeweled
- Order of Osmanieh, Jeweled
- Order of Medjidie, Jeweled
- Liakat War Medal in Gold
- Imtiyaz War Medal in Silver

Foreign honours

- Austria-Hungary: Grand-Cross of the Order of Leopold, 6 June 1918

=== Military appointments ===
==== Military ranks and army appointments ====
- c. 1918: Colonel of Infantry, Ottoman Army

== Issue ==
Name	Birth	Death	Notes
By Safiru Hanım (1884–1975)
Şehzade Ali Vâsib	13 October 1903	9 December 1983	born in Çırağan Palace; married Mukbile Sultan, daughter of Şehzade Ömer Hilmi and Gülnev Hanım; died in Alexandria, Egypt

== See also ==
- Line of succession to the former Ottoman throne

== Sources ==
- Brookes, Douglas Scott (2010). The Concubine, the Princess, and the Teacher: Voices from the Ottoman Harem. University of Texas Press. ISBN 978-0-292-78335-5.
- Uçan, Lâle (2019). Son Halife Abdülmecid Efendi'nin Hayatı - Şehzâlik, Veliahtlık ve Halifelik Yılları (PDF) (PhD Thesis). Istanbul University Institute of Social Sciences.

Şehzade Ahmed Nihad House of Osman Born: 6 July 1883 Died: 4 June 1954
Preceded by Abdulmejid II	Head of the Osmanoğlu family 23 August 1944 – 4 June 1954	Succeeded by Osman Fuad
