= Behiye Sultan =

Ottoman princess (1881-1948)

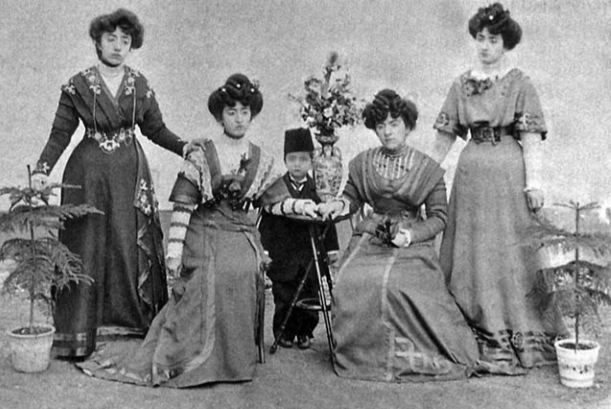
- Behiye Sultan (second from right) in 1907
- Born: 29 September 1881; Çırağan Palace, Constantinople, Ottoman Empire
- Died: 5 March 1948 (aged 66); Cairo, Egypt
- Burial: Abdul Halim Pasha Mausoleum, Cairo, Egypt
- Spouse: Hafız Hakkı Pasha (m. 1910; died 1915)
- House: Ottoman
- Father: Şehzade Mehmed Selaheddin
- Mother: Naziknaz Hanım
- Religion: Sunni Islam

Behiye Sultan (Ottoman Turkish: بهیه سلطان; 29 September 1881 – 5 March 1948) was the eldest surviving daughter of Şehzade Mehmed Selaheddin (1861–1915), who was the son of Ottoman Sultan Murad V (reigned 1876). Her mother was Naziknaz Hanım.

== Early years ==
Behiye Sultan was born on 29 September 1881 in the Çırağan Palace. Her father was Şehzade Mehmed Selaheddin, son of Murad V and Reftarıdil Kadın and her mother was Naziknaz Hanım. She had a brother, Şehzade Ahmed Nihad, two years younger than her, and a younger sister, Behice Sultan, stillbirth.

Behiye married Hafız Hakkı Pasha (1878-1915), a general in the imperial Ottoman army, in a double wedding with her sister Rukiye Sultan. The marriage contract was concluded at the Ortaköy Palace on 17 February 1910. The wedding took place on 12 January 1911 at the Vasıf Pasha Palace, and the couple was given one of the palaces of Ortaköy as their residence. She remained childless. She did not remarry after her husband's death in 1915.

== Exile ==
At the exile of imperial family in March 1924, she settled in Cairo. She lived in a tiny villa on Road 13. Her neighbors, the Wahid Raafat family, never saw anyone visit her. No one noticed when she moved out. All of a sudden she was replaced in the small house by astronomer Professor Khayri, director of the Helwan observatory. Sharing the same boisterous gardener 'Am Ibrahim,' the Raafats would send the princess home-baked kahk during Eid al-Fitr. A few years later, by mere coincidence Dr. Wahid Raafat found himself wrongly implicated in an alleged royalist plot concocted by members of the princess's extended family. He was subsequently imprisoned, without trial, for several weeks.

== Death ==
She died on 5 March 1948 in her home in Maadi, Cairo, Egypt, and was buried in the mausoleum of Abdul Halim Pasha.

== Honours ==
- Order of the Medjidie, Jeweled
- Order of Charity, 1st Class
- Navy Medal in Gold

== In literature ==
- Behiye Sultan is a character in Ayşe Osmanoğlu's historical novel The Gilded Cage on the Bosphorus (2020).

== Sources ==
- Brookes, Douglas Scott (2010). The Concubine, the Princess, and the Teacher: Voices from the Ottoman Harem. University of Texas Press. ISBN 978-0-292-78335-5.
- Vâsıb, Ali; Osmanoğlu, Osman Selaheddin (2004). Bir şehzadenin hâtırâtı: vatan ve menfâda gördüklerim ve işittiklerim. YKY. ISBN 978-9-750-80878-4.
