= Niloufer Hospital =

- Government of Telangana

Geography
- Location: Hyderabad, India

Organisation
- Affiliated university: Kaloji Narayana Rao University of Health Sciences

Services
- Emergency department: yes
- Beds: 1.200

Helipads
- Helipad: No

History
- Founded: 1953

Links
- Website: nilouferhospital.in

Niloufer Hospital is housed in a building in the heart of historic Hyderabad and has an interesting past. This reputed institution was founded in 1949 by the Ottoman Princess Niloufer. Princess Niloufer was the daughter of a princess of the former Ottoman Empire (Turkey) and was married to prince Moazzam Jah- son of 7th Nizam Mir Osman Ali Khan - (the last Asaf Jahi ruler) of Hyderabad Deccan in 1931. Just like Florence Nightingale, the princess had an inclination to serve the poor and also took to serving them as a nurse.

== History ==
In 1949, one of the princess' maids, Rafatunnisa Begum, died during childbirth due to lack of medical facilities. On hearing this news, the princess was very shattered. She then decided to ensure that no mother faces death hereafter. Princess Niloufer made known to her father-in-law the problems arising due to this lack of medical facilities.

During those times, childbirth took place mostly at home and even simple complications could prove fatal for mother or child. Mir Najaf Ali Khan, member of H.E.H. the Nizam's Charitable Trust states that the princess had quoted “No more Rafaths shall die” when she decided to build a hospital. As a result, a specialty hospital for women and children was built in the Red Hills, Hyderabad area of the city.

It was her philanthropy and sympathy for the Poor and the sick that took the form of this modern temple. The Institution of Niloufer Hospital was intended for critical cases especially of maternity department.

In 1953, what began as a 100-bed hospital to meet the health requirements of the mother & child, was destined to progress with no looking back. The hospital fleet enhanced its occupancy to 1.200 beds with advanced maternity, pediatric, pediatric surgery supported by diagnostic facilities. Current TRS Government since its inception in 2014 has taken steps much to discipline things within the hospital administration.

Currently, the hospital is headed by Himayat Ali Mirza, grandson of Moazzam Jah and his second wife.

Veena and Vani, born in 2003, are conjoined twins undergoing treatment at the hospital.

== Controversy ==
In 2018, the hospital was accused of negligence after the death of a toddler due to alleged incompatible blood transfusion (Toddler had Hemophagocytic lymphohistiocytosis).

== See also ==
- Durru Shehvar Children's & General Hospital
- Nizam's Institute of Medical Sciences
- Establishments in Hyderabad State
