= Hafiz Hakki Pasha =

Damat Hafız Hakkı Pasha (1899)
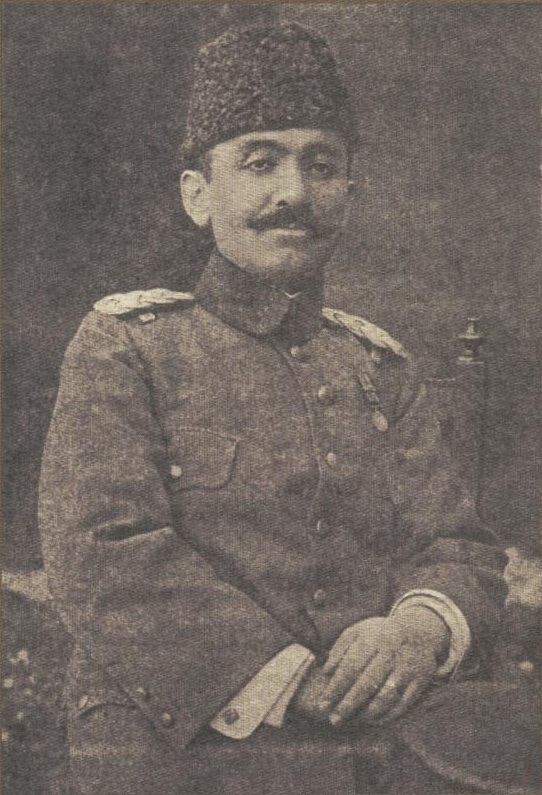
- Born: 24 April 1878; Edirne, Ottoman Empire
- Died: 15 February 1915 (aged 36); Erzurum, Ottoman Empire
- Spouse: Behiye Sultan
- Military career
- Allegiance: Ottoman Empire
- Branch: Ottoman Army
- Service years: 1901–1915
- Rank: Major general
- Commands: X Corps, Third Army
- Conflicts: Balkan Wars: First World War; Caucasus Campaign; Battle of Sarikamish

Damat Hafız Hakkı Pasha (Turkish: Hafız Hakkı Paşa; 24 April 1878 in Edirne – 15 February 1915 in Erzurum), was an officer in the Ottoman Army who rose to the rank of Major General. He commanded troops during the Balkan Wars and the First World War.

== Career ==
Hafız Hakkı attended the Ottoman Military Academy, and graduated with Enver Pasha, Mahmud Kâmil Pasha, and Fahreddin Pasha. He finished second in his class (Fahreddin was first, Enver was fourth, Mahmud Kâmil was eighth) and also graduated from the Ottoman Military College first in his class (Enver was second, Mahmud Kâmil was fourth, Fahreddin was seventh) on 5 December 1902. He was known as one of the "Freedom Heroes" in 1908. Hafız Hakkı Bey fought in the Balkan Wars of 1912-1913 and went on to write books about how armies should be led.

In World War I, Hakkı was one of the Ottoman commanders at the Battle of Sarikamish. As a Colonel, Hakkı was placed in charge of X Corps along the Ottoman Army's left flank. During this battle, the Ottoman Army was utterly defeated by a much smaller Russian force. During the Ottoman retreat, their army was nearly annihilated, mostly due to extremely cold temperatures.

== Personal life ==
He married the Ottoman Princess Behiye Sultan, who was the eldest surviving daughter of Şehzade Mehmed Selaheddin, the son of Sultan Murad V, in a double wedding with her sister Rukiye Sultan. The marriage contract was concluded at the Ortaköy Palace on 17 February 1910. The wedding took place on 12 January 1911 at the Vasıf Pasha Palace, and the couple was given one of the Palaces of Ortaköy as their residence. He became a Damat. He remained childless. She did not remarry.

== Death ==
Hafız was appointed by Enver Pasha to take over the remnants of the Ottoman Army in the Caucasus on 8 January 1915. He went on to contract typhus, and ultimately died from the disease just five weeks later, in the Turkish city of Erzurum.

== Sources ==
- Vâsıb, Ali; Osmanoğlu, Osman Selaheddin (2004). Bir şehzadenin hâtırâtı: vatan ve menfâda gördüklerim ve işittiklerim. YKY. ISBN 978-9-750-80878-4.
