= Nizamat Jung =

Arab-Indian poet (1871–1955)

Nawab Sir Nizamat Jung
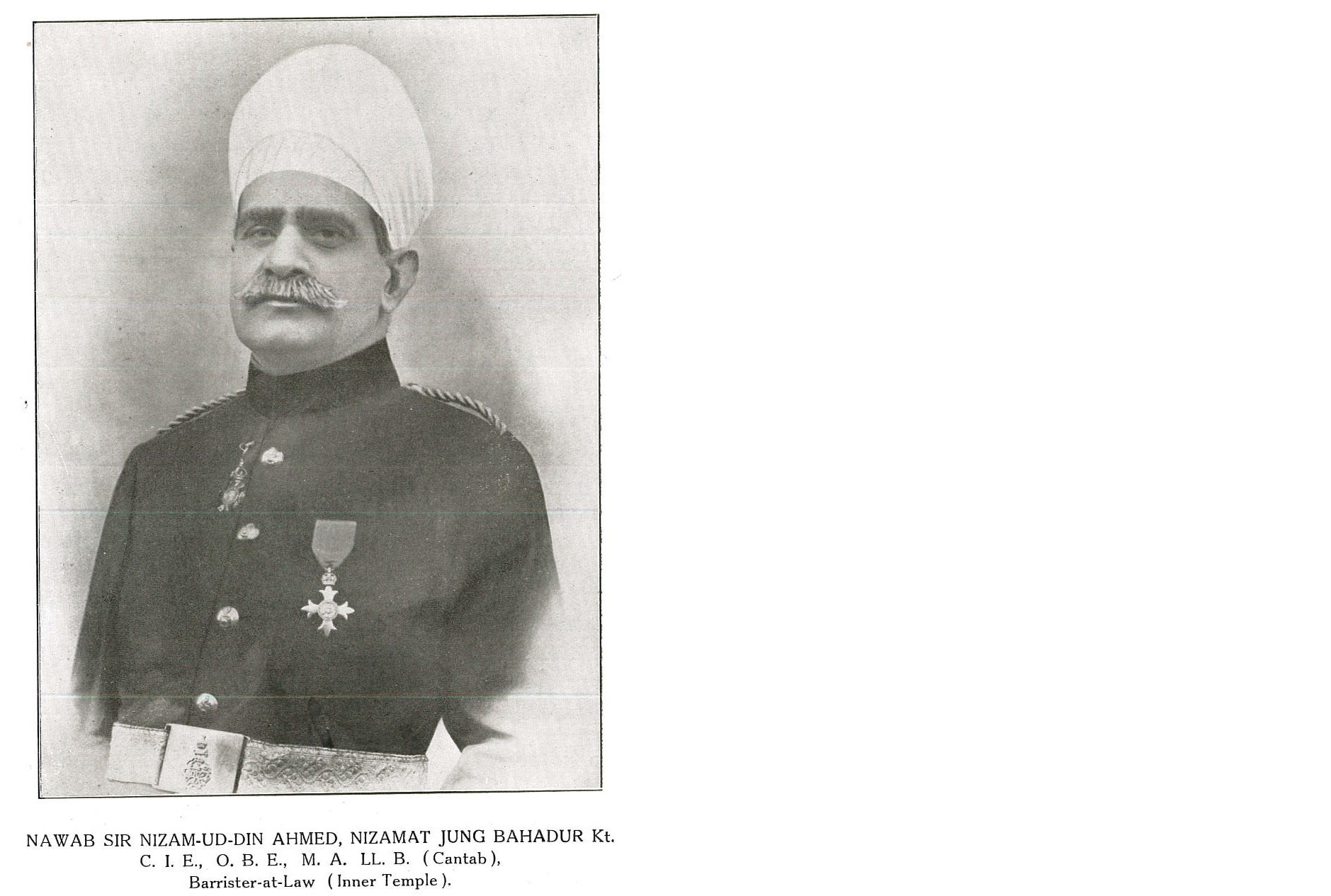

Chief Justice of the Hyderabad High Court
- In office 1916-1918
- Succeeded by: Mirza Yar Jung

Personal details
- Born: April 22, 1871
- Died: 1955 (aged 83–84)
- Parent: Rafat Yar Jung
- Education: Trinity College, Cambridge

Nawab Sir Nizamat Jung Bahadur (22 April 1871 in Hyderabad State – 1955) was an Arab-Indian poet. Nizamuddin was the second son of the Late Nawab Rafath Yar Jung Bahadur (Moulvi Shaikh Ahmed Hussain), Subedar of Warangal, well known in his days as an ardent educational and social reformer and statesman of no mean order.

== Early life ==
Nawab Sir Nizamath Jung, was educated at the Madrassa-i-Aizza, a school founded by his father in 1878. He proceeded to England in 1887, joined Trinity College, Cambridge, and took the degrees of B. A., LL. B. Honours ) in 1891, being the first Hyderabadi to achieve this.

Later on, he became a Barrister-at-Law, being called to the Bar from the Inner Temple in 1895 during his second visit to England.

== Career ==
In 1896, he enrolled as an advocate at the Madras High Court. He joined the Nizam's service in 1897 as District Judge. Parbhani.

In 1899, he was appointed city magistrate and in 1906, the under-secretary to the Legislative Department. Between 1916 and 1918, he was the chief justice of Hyderabad.

Serving as an official of numerous prestigious posts, he was a political minister and served as the chief justice of the Hyderabad Deccan High Court during the reign of the Nizams.

== Personal life ==
Nizamuddin built Hill Fort Palace on Naubat Pahad, which was later purchased by the erstwhile Nizam HEH Mir Osman Ali Khan for his son Prince Moazzam Jah. Nizamuddin's first cousin Hakim-ud-Dowla was also a chief justice and he was the owner of the Bella Vista Palace located adjacent to Hill Fort Palace.

== Honours ==
- OBE, 3 June 1919
- C.I.E, 1 January 1924
- Knighthood, 3 June 1929.

== Legacy ==
His personal book collection was made available for the public in 1972 when the Nizamat Jung Memorial Library was established in his name at Narayanguda, Hyderabad.
