= Hill Fort Palace =

Coordinates: 17.40330°N 78.47404°E

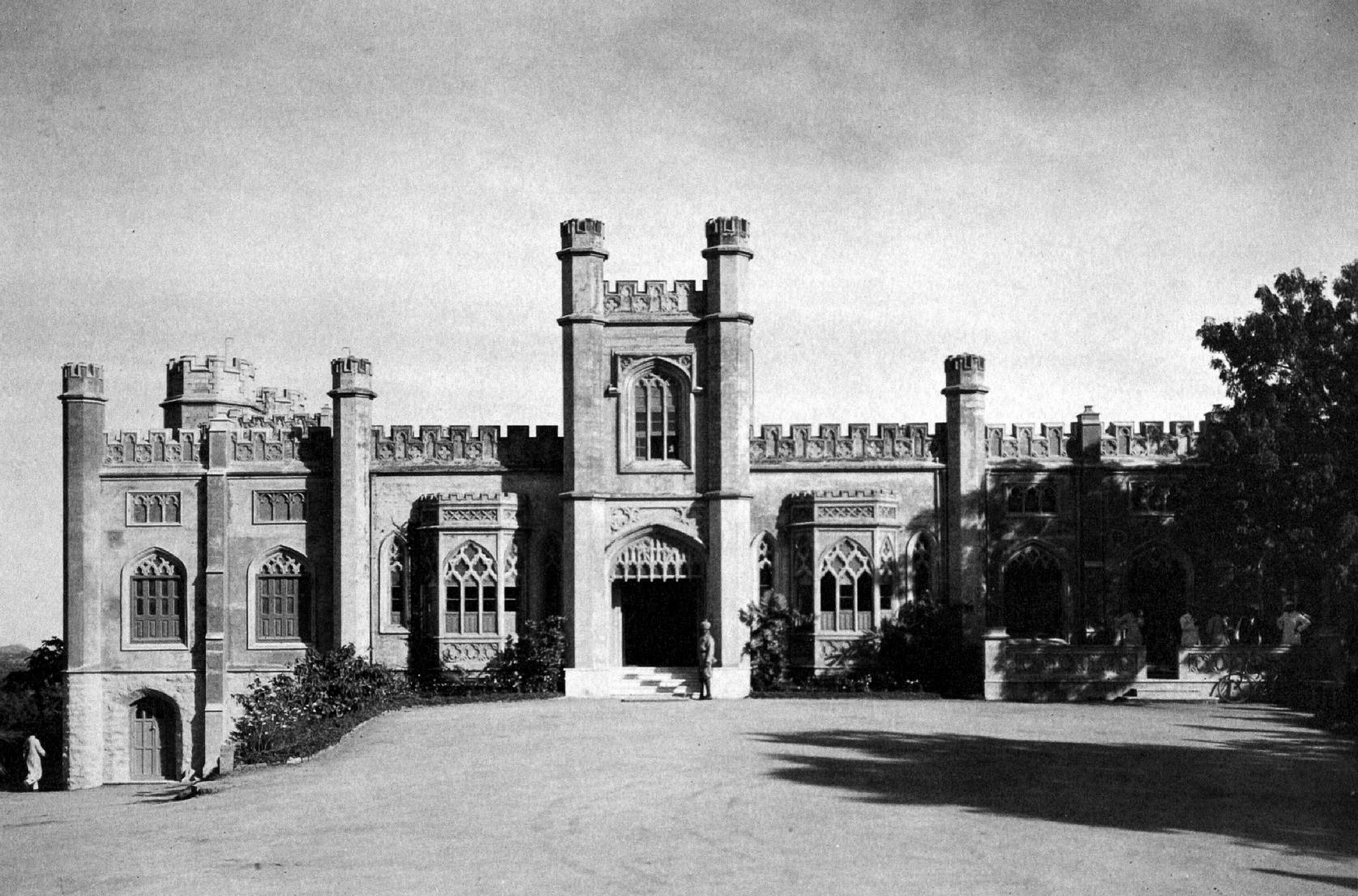
- A view of the Hill Fort in the 1930s
- Interactive map of the Hill Fort Palace area
- Former names: Ritz Hotel (1980–1997)

General information
- Type: Royal Palace
- Location: Naubhat Pahad, Hyderabad, Telangana, India
- Completed: 1915; 111 years ago
- Owner: Telangana State Tourism Development Corporation
- హిల్ ఫోర్ట్ ప్యాలెస్ (Telugu); ھل فورٹ محل (Urdu)

History
- Built for: Nizamat Jung
- Original use: Residence of Nizamat Jung (1915–1929); Residence of Prince Moazzam Jah (1929–1955); As a luxury hotel (1980–1997)

Hill Fort Palace, also known as Ritz Hotel, is a royal palace located in Naubhat Pahad, Hyderabad, Telangana. The property is now owned by Government of Telangana, Telangana State Tourism Development Corporation.

== History ==
=== Residence (1915–1955) ===
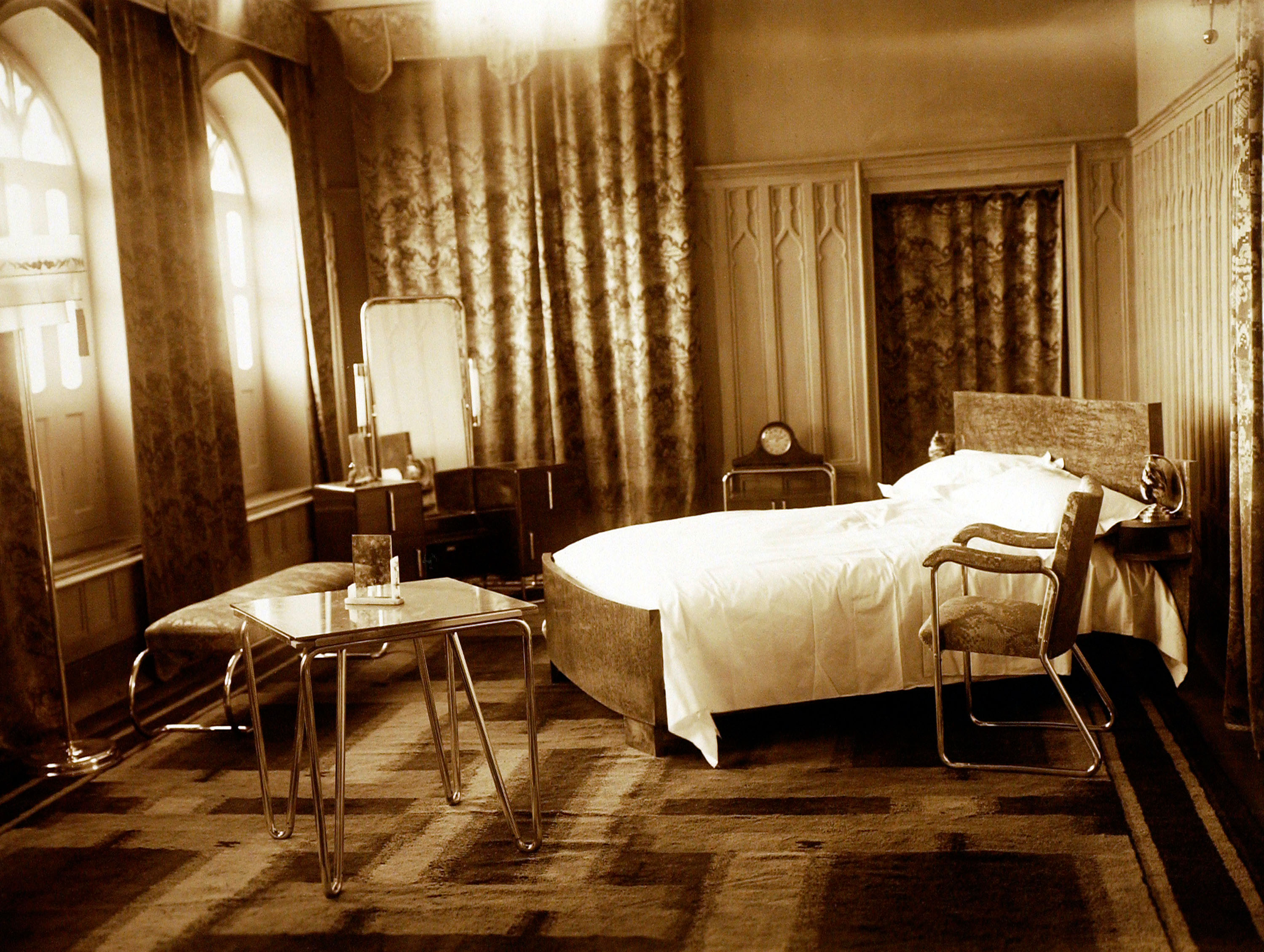
A view of one of the bedrooms of the Palace in 1930

Hill Fort Palace was built in 1915 by Nizamat Jung, who served as chief justice in the government of Nizam, India. His stay in the palace was for 15 years. Nizam Jung who was fascinated with English language and architecture designed the palace based on castles described in Sir Walter Scott’s novels. The palace had 40 rooms, three large banquet halls and a swimming pool.

In 1929, after his return from Haj, Jung wanted to live a simpler life. The palace was then purchased by Asaf Jah VII for his son Prince Moazzam Jah, and then designated as the official residence of the chairman of the City Improvement Board.

=== Government takeover and Ritz Hotel (1955–1997) ===
Hill Fort Palace was taken over by Indian government after Operation Polo. In 1955, the palace was leased to Ritz Hotel Company for running a hotel. The lease was terminated by the state government and in the late 1997, the property was handed over to the AP Tourism Corporation. The property has remained idle since then.

=== Abandoned (1997–present) ===
Today, the structure is dilapidated and in urgent need of restoration.

In 2022, an expert committee submitted a report recommending the demolition of the palace to the High Court. In a PIL verdict, the high court ordered the state government to commence restoration work at the palace.

== Location ==
The palace is located in the heart of the city near Naubat Pahad spread over 6 acres.
