= Şehzade Mehmed Selaheddin =

Ottoman prince, son of Sultan Murad V

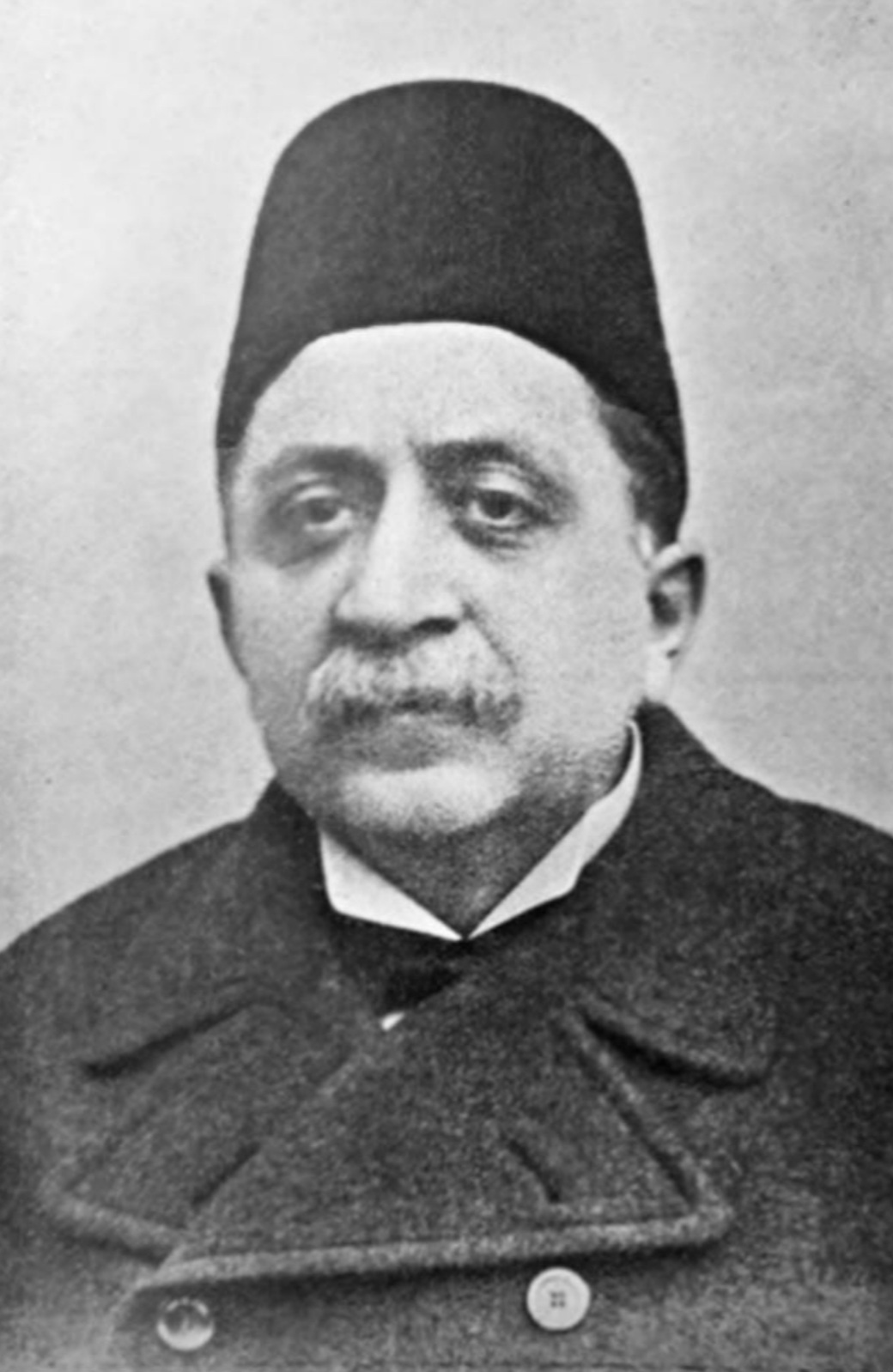
- Şehzade Mehmed Selaheddin, aged forty eight, Şehbal, 28 May 1909
- Born: 5 August 1861; Dolmabahçe Palace, Constantinople, Ottoman Empire (now Istanbul, Turkey)
- Died: 29 April 1915 (aged 53); Feneryolu Villa, Üsküdar, Istanbul, Ottoman Empire
- Burial: Şehzade Ahmed Kemaleddin Mausoleum, Yahya Efendi Cemetery, Istanbul
- Spouse: Dilaviz Hanım (m. 1877; died 1880) Zatıgül Hanım (m. 1878; died 1896) Vasfıcihan Hanım (m. 1879; div. 1882): Naziknaz Hanım; Gülter Hanım (died 1895) Jalefer Hanım (m. 1891): Dilberistan Hanım
- Issue Amongs others: Behiye Sultan; Şehzade Ahmed Nihad; Şehzade Osman Fuad; Adile Sultan
Names
- Turkish: Şehzade Mehmed Selaheddin; Ottoman Turkish: شہزادہ محمد صلاح الدین
- Dynasty: Ottoman
- Father: Murad V
- Mother: Reftarıdil Kadın
- Religion: Sunni Islam

Şehzade Mehmed Selaheddin Efendi (Ottoman Turkish: شہزادہ محمد صلاح الدین; 5 August 1861 – 29 April 1915) was an Ottoman prince, the only surviving son of Sultan Murad V, and his second consort Reftarıdil Kadın.

== Early life ==
Şehzade Mehmed Selaheddin was born on 5 August 1861 in the Dolmabahçe Palace, in Beşiktaş. His father was Sultan Murad V, son of Sultan Abdulmejid I and Şevkefza Kadın, and his mother was Reftarıdil Kadın. He was the eldest child, and only survived son of his father, and the only child of his mother. His birth violated the rules of the time, which required Ottoman princes not to have children before ascending the throne, but Murad got an exception from his uncle Sultan Abdülaziz, who had once done the same and didn't care much for that rule. Later, Murad had four other children before he became Sultan: Şehzade Süleyman, Şehzade Seyfeddin, Hatice Sultan and Fehime Sultan.

After Abdulmejid's death in 1861, and the ascension of his brother Sultan Abdulaziz to the throne, Murad became the crown prince. His family lived in a mansion in Kurbağalıdere, which was allocated to him by Abdulaziz. They spent their winters in the crown princes apartments located in the Dolmabahçe Palace and the Nisbetiye Mansion.

Selaheddin was circumcised in 1870. Other princes who were circumcised along with him included, his uncles, Şehzade Selim Süleyman, Şehzade Mehmed Vahideddin (future Mehmed VI), sons of Sultan Abdulmejid I, Şehzade Yusuf Izzeddin, Şehzade Mahmud Celaleddin, sons of Sultan Abdulaziz, and Sultanzade Alaeddin Bey, son of Münire Sultan, daughter of Abdulmejid.

Selaheddin's early education took place in the Prince's School, Dolmabahçe Palace, where his tutor was Süleyman Agha. After graduating from the Prince's School, he was enrolled in the Ottoman Military College.

== Confinement ==
=== Murad's deposition ===
Selaheddin's father, Sultan Murad accended the throne on 30 May 1876, after the deposition of his uncle Sultan Abdulaziz. His family then settled in the Dolmabahçe Palace. After reigning for three months, he was deposed on 30 August 1876, due to mental instability and was imprisoned in the Çırağan Palace. Selaheddin was removed from the military college. He and his mother followed Murad into confinement. At that time he was fifteen years old. His apartments were located on the ground floor of the palace.

=== Ali Suavi incident ===
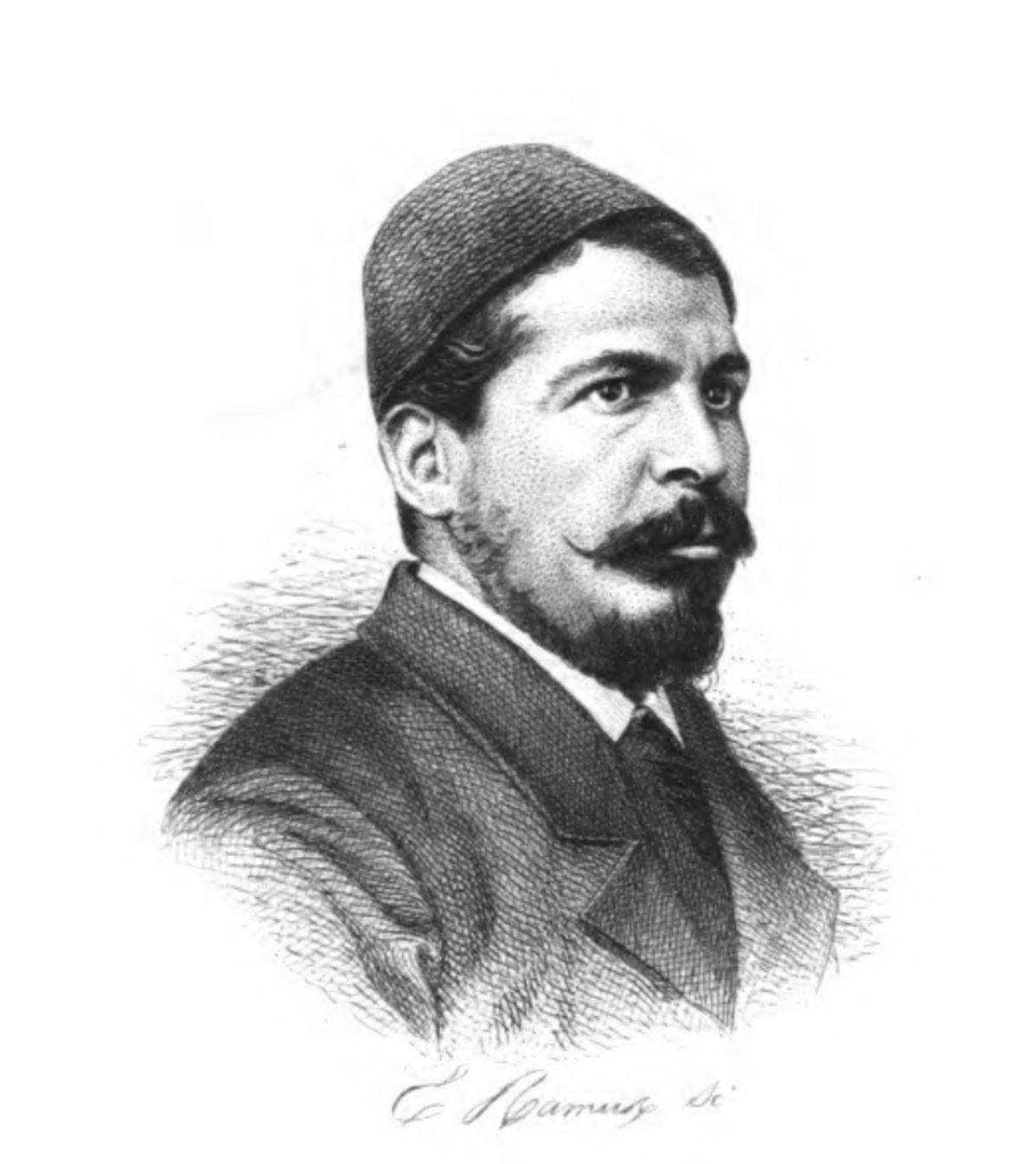
Ali Suavi, an Ottoman political activist, journalist, educator, theologian and reformer, involved in the incident

On 20 May 1878, an attempt was made to liberate Murad from the Çırağan Palace and restore him to the throne. Murad's brothers, Şehzade Ahmed Kemaleddin and Şehzade Selim Süleyman, and sisters, Fatma Sultan and Seniha Sultan, and her husband Mahmud Celaleddin Pasha were involved in the plot. They all wanted to see the rightful Sultan on the throne. During the incident Ali Suavi, the radical political opponent of Abdul Hamid's authoritarian regime stormed the palace with a band of armed refugees from the recent Russo-Turkish War (1877–1878). Selahaddin evaded the guards, and followed his loyal servant, Tirendaz Kalfa, to the battleship Mesudiye that was anchored offshore the palace to take him and Murad to announce his accession. Murad didn't reached the battleship, but Selahaddin did. Ali Suavi's men were unable to overcome the fierce resistance of the Beşiktaş police prefect, Hacı Hasan Pasha. The plot failed, and Ali Suavi and most of his men were killed. Selaheddin then returned to the palace. In the aftermath, security at the Çırağan Palace was tightened.

=== Life in confinement ===
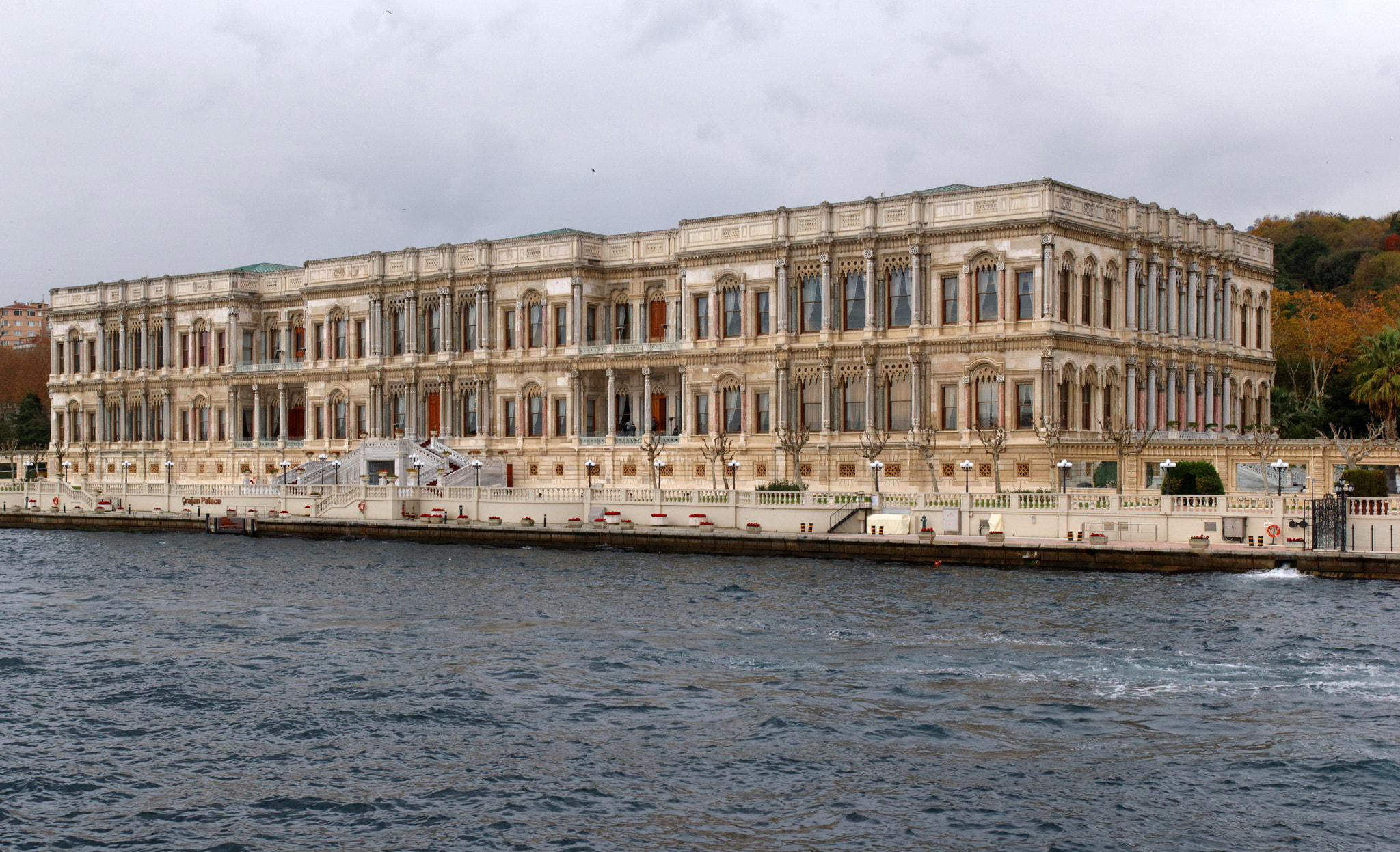
Çırağan Palace, where Selaheddin and his family were confined by Sultan Abdul Hamid for twenty-eight years until Murad's death in 1904

Rifat Pasha, who had been appointed to treat the people of Murad's entourage, proposed Selaheddin to teach him a bit about medicine. Selaheddin gladly accepted his proposal. The two of them decided to say that Selaheddin was suffering from some illness. Rifat Pasha then began to come to the palace frequently, first treating whoever might really be sick before shutting himself up in a room with Selaheddin and working with him. Rifat Pasha would dictate the important things to Selaheddin, who wrote them down and then sat and memorized them at night. Selaheddin's study of medicine in this way proved to be quite useful, for the day came when he even treated his father himself.

After Şevkefza Kadın's death in 1889, Murad focused all his love and attention on his children. Selaheddin became his companion in grief, and the two of them passed long hours together reminiscing about bygone days as well as speculating on the future. For some time father and son took an interest in the Mesnevi, spending hours reciting verses from that work and taking great pleasure in doing so. During this time Selaheddin also wrote a diary which give an account of the daily life of the imprisoned members of his father's immediate family and their retinue.

== Personal life ==
While Murad V's daughters were finally allowed to marry only on the condition that they never return to Çırağan Palace and therefore never see the family again, Salaheddin was allowed to have his own harem inside the Palace.

His first consort was Dilaviz Hanım, also known as Dilâru. She was a Georgian or a Laz, and was taken before the age of two by a well-to-do family from Batumi, among whom she grew up in Istanbul. She had been in Albania, Syria, and Batumi region. In 1874, she came to Istanbul with her own mistress, and was sold with her own consent when she arrived at the palace of Mahmud Celaleddin Pasha, husband of Princess Seniha Sultan. At the accession of Sultan Murad in 1876, she was presented to the palace along with nine other girls by the pasha. She was given to Selaheddin. They married on 13 March 1877. She was the mother of Ayşe Beyhan Sultan, born in 1878. Soon after she contracted Tuberculosis, after which she was transferred to the Malta Pavilion in Yıldız Palace. She died on 29 June 1880, and was buried in Yahya Efendi Cemetery.

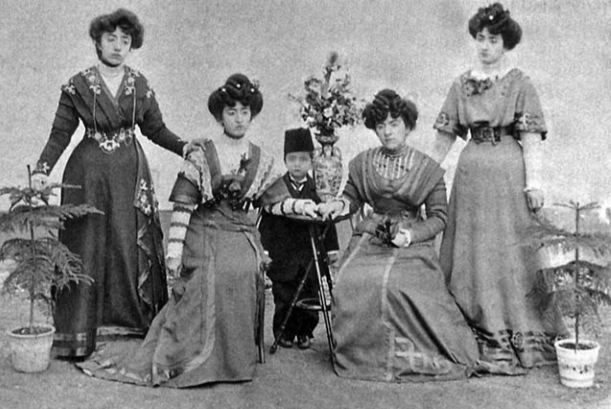
Şehzade Mehmed Selaheddin's daughters (left to right) in 1907, the princesses Adile Sultan, Rukiye Sultan, Behiye Sultan, and Atiye Sultan. In the center is his grandson Şehzade Ali Vasıb

His second consort was Tevhide Zatıgül Hanım. She was born on 25 January 1864 in Batumi, Georgia. Born as Gülşen, she was the daughter of Ibrahim Bey (died 1885) and his wife Hanım. She had three brothers, Hüseyin Bey, Ömer Bey, and Şehabeddin Bey, and one sister named Nasibe or Hasibe Hanım. She began her service in the palace as a kalfa in the entourage of Sultan Murad in or before 1876. They married on 3 December 1878. She was the mother of Celile Sultan, born in 1882, Rukiye Sultan, born in 1885, Adile Sultan, born in 1887, Şehzade Mehmed, born and died in 1889, and Emine Atiye Sultan, born in 1891. She died on 8 April 1896, and was buried in Yahya Efendi Cemetery.

His third consort was Zeliha Vasfıcihan Hanım. She was presented to the palace by Mahmud Celaleddin Pasha at the accession of Sultan Murad in 1876 along with nine other girls. She was given to Selaheddin's grandmother Şevkefza Kadın. They married in February 1879. She was the mother of Şehzade Livaeddin, born in 1880. The two divorced in 1882, after which she went to live in Orta Pavilion in Yıldız Palace. She remained there for four months, until she was assigned to live in Medina, and was given a monthly stipend of 500 piasters. However, she was not paid the pension and instead worked in a sewing workshop. She then went to Hejaz, and came back to Istanbul in 1909.

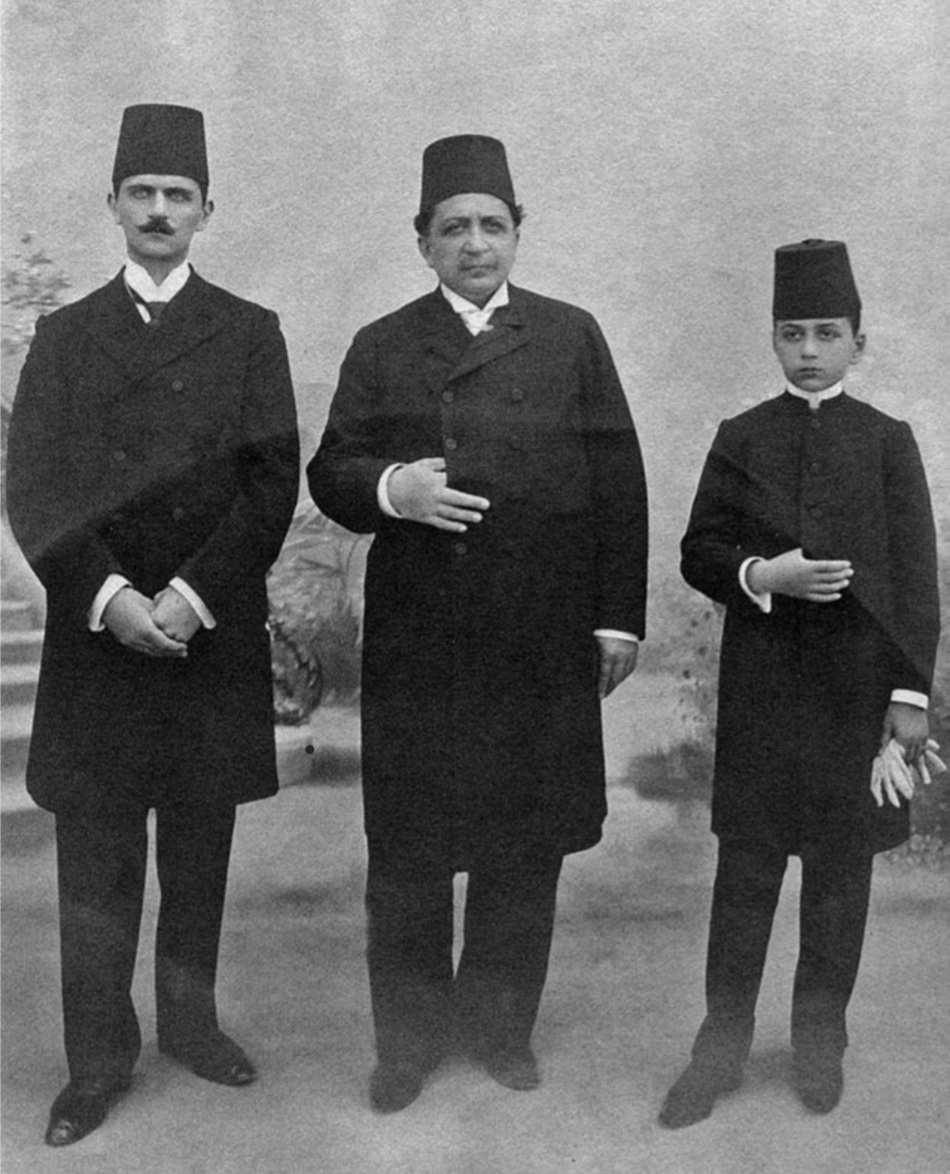
Selaheddin flanked by his sons Şehzade Ahmed Nihad (left) and Şehzade Osman Fuad (right) in 1906

His fourth consort was Naziknaz Hanım. She was born in 1860. She was the mother of Behiye Sultan, born in 1881, Şehzade Ahmed Nihad, born in 1883, and Behice Sultan, born in 1887. She died in Nice, France in 1928.

His fifth consort was Gülter Hanım. She was born in 1867. She was the mother of Safiye Sultan, born in 1887. She died on 17 February 1895, and was buried in Yahya Efendi Cemetery.

His sixth consort was Jalefer Hanım. She was born on 19 August 1872 in Kars, Caucasus. They married in 1891. She was the mother of Şehzade Osman Fuad, born in 1895. She died on 7 April 1937 in Istanbul.

His seventh consort was Cemile Dilberistan Hanım. She was born in 1880. She was the mother of Şehzade Mehmed Nijad Nejad, born and died in 1896, and Şehzade Mehmed Namik Vanik, born in 1898., In 1934, in accordance to the Surname Law, she took the surname "Hakgil". She died on 12 January 1966 in Istanbul.

== Last years and death ==
After Murad's death in 1904, which Salaheddin had tried to help with his medical knowledge, Selaheddin's ordeal in the Çırağan Palace came to an end. He then settled in one of the villas of Feneryolu, Üsküdar. A prince of high intelligence, Selaheddin, however, having spent many years in confinement, became spiritually and physically ruined. He had aged before time, and the allowance provided to him by the government after the second constitution in 1908, didn't fulfill his financial crisis. He died on 29 April 1915 at the age of fifty three, having outlived his father by a mere eleven years and leaving two sons and four daughters. He was buried in the mausoleum of Şehzade Ahmed Kemaleddin, Yahya Efendi Cemetery, Istanbul.

== Honours ==
Styles of Şehzade Mehmed Selaheddin
- Reference style: His Imperial Highness
- Spoken style: Your Imperial Highness

- Order of the House of Osman, Jeweled
- Order of Glory, Jeweled
- Order of Distinction, Jeweled
- Order of Osmanieh, Jeweled
- Order of the Medjidie, Jeweled

== Issue ==
=== Sons ===
Şehzade Mehmed Selaheddin had eight sons:

- Şehzade Mehmed Livaeddin (25 June 1880 – 1 August 1882) - with Zeliha Vasfıcihan Hanım. Born and died in Çırağan Palace.
- Şehzade Ahmed Nihad (6 July 1883 – 4 June 1954) - with Naziknaz Hanim. He had three consort and a son. 38th Head of the Imperial House of Osman.
- Şehzade Osman Füad (February 25, 1885 - May 22, 1973) - with Jalefer Hanim. 39th Head of the Imperial House of Osman.
- Şehzade Mehmed (23 March 1889 - 23 March 1889) - with Tevhide Zatigül Hanim. Born and died in Çırağan Palace.
- Şehzade Mehmed (2 March 1891 - 2 March 1891) - unknown motherhood. Born and died in Çırağan Palace.
- Şehzade Mehmed Nijad Nejad (3 March 1896 - 3 March 1896) - with Cemile Dilberistân Hanim. Born and died in Çırağan Palace.
- Şehzade Mehmed Vamik Namik (24 June 1898 - 18 September 1899) - with Cemile Dilberistân Hanim. Born and died in Çırağan Palace.
- Şehzade Nureddin (? -?) - unknown motherhood. Born dead in Çırağan Palace.

=== Daughters ===
Şehzade Mehmed Selaheddin had eight daughters:

- Ayşe Beyhan Sultan (17 July 1878 - 17 December 1878) - with Dilaviz Hanim. She was born and died in Çırağan Palace.
- Behiye Sultan (29 September 1881 - 5 March 1948) - with Naziknaz Hanim. She married once with no children.
- Celile Sultan (5 March 1882 - 24 November 1899) - with Tevhide Zatigül Hanim. Born in Çırağan Palace, her grandfather Murad V composed a polka of her in her honor. She died of typhus at Çırağan Palace, she is buried in the Yahya Efendi cemetery.
- Rukiye Sultan (1 June 1885 - 16 June 1971) - with Tevhide Zatigül Hanim. Born in Çırağan Palace. On 17 February 1910 at Ortaköy Palace she married Şerif Mehmed Abdülmecid Haydar Bey, consummate in April 1913 at Göztepe Palace. She had no children. She died in Istanbul and was buried in the Zincirlikuyu cemetery.
- Adile Sultan (10 February 1887 - 6 December 1973) - with Tevhide Zatigül Hanim. Twice married, she had a daughter.
- Safiye Sultan (30 June 1887 - 20 February 1911) - with Güliter Hanim. Born in Çırağan Palace. She died of tuberculosis at Palazzo Feneryolu, buried in the Yahya Efendi cemetery.
- Behice Sultan (26 September 1887 - 26 September 1887) - with Naziknaz Hanim. Born and died in Çırağan Palace.
- Emine Atiye Sultan (4 December 1891 - 10 October 1978) - with Tevhide Zatigül Hanim. Born in Çırağan Palace. She married on September 24, 1914 at the Erenköy Palace Osman Hami Bey, childless. Died in Istanbul, buried in Mahmud II türbe.

== In literature ==
- Şehzade Mehmed Selaheddin is a character in Ayşe Osmanoğlu's historical novel The Gilded Cage on the Bosphorus (2020).

== Sources ==
- Brookes, Douglas Scott (1 January 2010). The Concubine, the Princess, and the Teacher: Voices from the Ottoman Harem. University of Texas Press. ISBN 978-0-292-78335-5.
- Brookes, Douglas S. (4 February 2020). On the Sultan's Service: Halid Ziya Uşaklıgil's Memoir of the Ottoman Palace, 1909–1912. Indiana University Press. ISBN 978-0-253-04553-9.
- Eldem, Edhem; Rothstein, Marian (2018). "The Harem as Seen by Prince Salahaddin Efendi (1861-1915). Searching for Women in Male-Authored Documentation". Clio. Women, Gender, History (48). Editions Belin: 29–54. ISSN 2554-3822. JSTOR 26946046.
- Koçu, Reşat Ekrem; Sağlam, Osman Ferid (1911). Musavver nevsâl-i Osmanî (in Turkish). Marmara University. hdl:11424/48517. OCLC 850834461.
- Vâsıb, Ali; Osmanoğlu, Osman Selaheddin (2004). Bir Şehzadenin Hâtırâtı: Vatan ve Menfâda Gördüklerim ve İşittiklerim. YKY. ISBN 978-9-750-80878-4.
