= Red Hills, Hyderabad =

Neighborhood of Hyderabad

Red Hills
- neighborhood
- Location within Hyderabad Location within Telangana Location within India
- Coordinates: 17.396248°N 78.468062°E
- Country: India
- State: Telangana
- City: Hyderabad

Red Hills is a neighbourhood of Hyderabad in Telangana, India.

== Transport ==
Red Hills is well-connected by the buses, TGSRTC (Telangana State Road Transport Corporation), that play on two routes which cover all the bus stops there. Their local train station for MMTS trains are Lakdikapul railway station and Hyderabad Deccan railway station.

== Major institutions ==
The area houses famous Niloufer Hospital - founded by the Ottoman princess Nilüfer Hanımsultan, the wife of one of the son of 7th Nizam Mir Osman Ali Khan and major cancer hospital MNJ Cancer Hospital. The Federation of Telangana and Andhra Pradesh Chambers of Commerce and Industry (FTAPCCI) is also located here.
