= Moazzam Jah =

Indian prince (1907–1987)

His Highness General Shahzada Nawab Shujat Ali Khan Bahadur KCIE
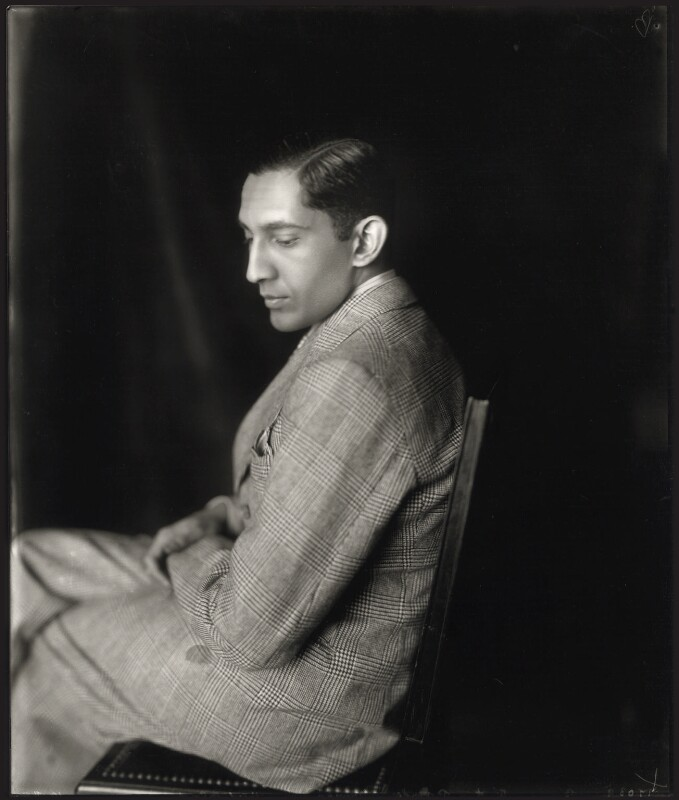
- Portrait photograph of Prince Moazzam Jah, 19 November 1931 (National Portrait Gallery, London)
- Born: 21 December 1907; Eden Garden, Hyderabad
- Died: 15 September 1987 (aged 79); Fern Villa, Red Hills, Hyderabad
- Burial place: Daira Mir Momin, Sultan Shahi, Hyderabad
- Spouse: Nilufer Hanımsultan (m. 1931; div. 1952) Razia Begum (m. 1948) Anwari Begum (m. 1952)
- Issue: 4
Names
- Sahebzadeh Mir Shuja'at Ali Khan Siddiqui Beyfendi Moazzam Jah
- House: House of Asaf Jah
- Father: Mir Osman Ali Khan, Asaf Jah VII

Moazzam Jah, Walashan Shahzada Nawab Mir Sir Shuja’at ‘Ali Khan Siddiqui Bahadur, KCIE (21 December 1907 – 15 September 1987), was the son of the last Nizam of Hyderabad, Osman Ali Khan, Asaf Jah VII and his first wife Azamunnisa Begum (Dulhan Pasha Begum).

He first married Princess Niloufer (4 January 1916 – 12 June 1989), one of the last princesses of the Ottoman Empire. He later had two other wives, Razia Begum Saheba and Anwari Begum Saheba. In 1947, he was granted the personal style of Highness by the King-Emperor George VI.

He was a poetry enthusiast who had close ties with the poet Najm Afandi after the latter moved from Agra to Hyderabad State. The Prince also wrote poetry under the pen name Shahji.

Jah stayed at the Hill Fort Palace, Hyderabad.

The popular Moazzam Jahi Market of Hyderabad is named after him.

== Early life ==
Jah was born as Mir Shujaat Ali Khan on 2 January 1908. His father was Mir Osman Ali Khan, the last Nizam of Hyderabad State of British India. Jah's mother Azamunnisa Begum (Dulhan Pasha Begum) was the first wife of Osman Ali Khan. Jah had an elder brother Azam Jah.

During his youth, Jah was popularly known as Junior Prince. He received an annual grant from his father, the Nizam.

== Poet ==
Jah composed Urdu poems and ghazals under the pseudonym "Shaji". He set up his own court of poetry in the Hill Fort Palace in which around 30 Urdu poets from as far as Lucknow and Delhi. The poets used to arrive at his court during the evening. A dinner was held at midnight. Jah used to recite the poems composed by himself at the court. After him, the other poets used to recite their own. It continued until the adhan (Islamic call to prayer) of the Fajr prayer.

== Personal life ==
On 12 November 1931, Jah married Niloufer, aged 15, a princess of the Ottoman Empire at Nice in France. On the same day, Jah's elder brother Azam Jah married Niloufer's cousin Durru Shehvar. These weddings were held as "union of two great dynasties" by contemporary records. Niloufer's inability to bear any child strained their marriage. In 1952, after 21 years of marriage, they officially divorced.

On 19 October 1948, Jah married for a second time to Razia Begum, after separation from Princess Niloufer. With her he had three daughters, Fatima Fouzia Begum, Amina Merzia Begum and Oolia Kulsum Begum. He married his third wife Anwari Begum in December 1952. With her he had a son, Shahamat Jah.

Fatima Fouzia married Nader Ali Mirza, Nawab of Machilipatnam, and had two sons Shaffat Asghar Ali Mirza & Himayat Ali Mirza and two daughters, Shafiya Sakina and Naqiya Zainab. Her son Himayat Ali was involved in handing over of Nizam's jewels to the Government of India in 1990s.

== Titles ==
- 1907–1929: Moazzam Jah, Walashan Shahzada Nawab Mir Shuja’at ‘Ali Khan Bahadur
- 1929–1945: Colonel Moazzam Jah, Walashan Shahzada Nawab Mir Shuja’at ‘Ali Khan Bahadur
- 1945–1946: General Moazzam Jah, Walashan Shahzada Nawab Mir Shuja’at ‘Ali Khan Bahadur
- 1946–1947: General Moazzam Jah, Walashan Shahzada Nawab Mir Sir Shuja’at ‘Ali Khan Bahadur, KCIE
- 1947–1987: General His Highness Moazzam Jah, Walashan Shahzada Nawab Mir Sir Shuja’at ‘Ali Khan Bahadur, KCIE

== Honours ==
(ribbon bar, as it would look today; incomplete)

- King George V Silver Jubilee Medal: 1935
- King George VI Coronation Medal: 1937
- Nizam Silver Jubilee Medal (mil.): 1937
- Tunis Victory Medal: 1942
- Hyderabad War Medal: 1945
- Knight Commander of the Order of the Indian Empire (KCIE): 1946
