= Reftarıdil Kadın =

Consort of Sultan Murad V

- Born: 1838; North Caucasus
- Died: 3 March 1936 (aged 97–98); Ortaköy, Istanbul, Turkey
- Spouse: Murad V (m. 1859; died 1904)
- Issue: Şehzade Mehmed Selaheddin
Names
- Turkish: Reftaridil Kadın; Ottoman Turkish: رفتاردل قادین
- House: Ottoman (by marriage)
- Religion: Sunni Islam

Reftarıdil Kadın (Ottoman Turkish: رفتاردل قادین, "resurrection"; 1838 – 3 March 1936) was the second consort of Sultan Murad V of the Ottoman Empire.

== Early life ==
Reftarıdil Kadın was born circa 1838. She was a noble Circassian-Abkazian from Hatko family and had two sisters, Terandil Hanım and Ceylanyar Hanım. Ceylanyar was given to Dr. Mehmed Emin Pasha. She then married Hacı Nazıf Bey, and was renamed Melek. She had two children, a daughter, and a son named Rüşdü Bey. Terandil stayed with Reftaridil, and then married Nuri Bey, and went on to live in Aksaray.

== Marriage ==
Reftarıdil married Murad, during the reign of Sultan Abdulmejid I, when he was still a prince on 4 February 1859 in the Dolmabahçe Palace. She was twenty, while he was eighteen. She was his second consort after Mevhibe Kadın. After Abdulmejid's death in 1861, and the accession of his brother Sultan Abdulaziz, Murad became the crown prince. Reftarıdil, who was pregnant at the time, gave birth to her only child, a son, Şehzade Mehmed Selaheddin, on 5 August 1861 in the apartments of the crown prince located in the Dolmabahçe Palace. It was still technically forbidden for Ottoman princes to have children before becoming sultans, but Abdülaziz, who had himself had a son before ascending the throne, made an exception for Murad's child.

Murad and his consorts lived in a mansion in Kurbağalıdere, which was allocated to him by Abdulaziz. They used to spend their winters in the crown princes apartments located in the Dolmabahçe Palace and the Nisbetiye Mansion. She has been described as a lovely lady with a pink skin, large blue eyes, straight nose, and a round face. She loved music and reading and was highly educated. She is said to have smiled frequently.

Murad ascended the throne on 30 May 1876, after the deposition of his uncle Sultan Abdulaziz, Reftarıdil was given the title of "Second Kadın". After reigning for three months, Murad was deposed on 30 August 1876, due to mental instability and was imprisoned in the Çırağan Palace. Refarıdil also followed Murad into confinement. She was widowed at Murad's death in 1904, after which her ordeal in the Çırağan Palace came to an end.

== Last years and death ==
After Murad's death she lived first with his son and, after the dynasty was exiled, in a house in Ortaköy, where she also hosted Şayan Kadın, Murad's third consort. She was allowed to stay in Istanbul as she was only a widowed consort and not a blood member of the dynasty. Although she lived in precarious times and was in a tight financial situation, she was always cheerful and smiling. After the passing of the Surname Law, she took the name Reftaridil Hatgil.

She died on 3 March 1936.

== Issue ==
Name	Birth	Death	Notes
Şehzade Mehmed Selaheddin	5 August 1861	29 April 1915	married seven times, and had issue, eight sons and eight daughters

== In literature ==
- Reftarıdil is a character in Ayşe Osmanoğlu's historical novel The Gilded Cage on the Bosphorus (2020).

== See also ==
- Kadın (title)
- Ottoman Imperial Harem
- List of consorts of the Ottoman sultans

== Sources ==
- Brookes, Douglas Scott (2010). The Concubine, the Princess, and the Teacher: Voices from the Ottoman Harem. University of Texas Press. ISBN 978-0-292-78335-5.
- Uluçay, Mustafa Çağatay (2011). Padişahların kadınları ve kızları. Ankara: Ötüken. ISBN 978-9-754-37840-5.
