= Çırağan Palace =

Former Ottoman palace (now a five-star hotel) in Istanbul, Turkey

- Çırağan Sarayı

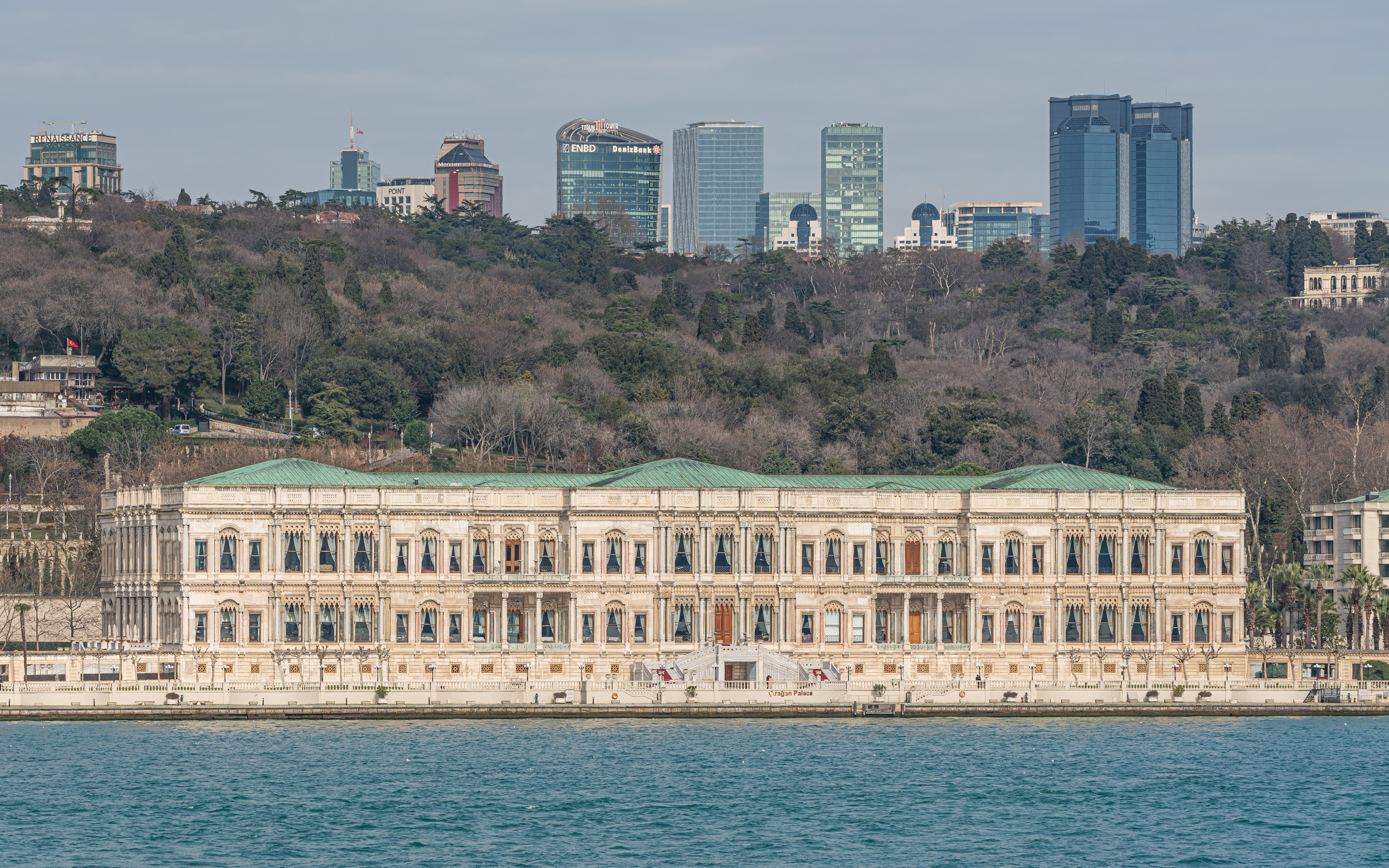
- A view of Çırağan Palace from the Bosporus
- Interactive map of the Çırağan Palace area
- Alternative names: Çırağan Palace Kempinski

General information
- Type: Hotel (former palace)
- Location: Beşiktaş, Çırağan Caddesi 32, Istanbul, Turkey
- Coordinates: 41.04444°N 29.01667°E
- Current tenants: Kempinski Hotels
- Construction started: 1863
- Completed: 1867
- Renovated: 1991

Design and construction
- Architect: Nigoğayos Balyan
- Structural engineer: Sarkis Balyan and Hagop Balyan

Çırağan Palace (Turkish: Çırağan Sarayı), a former Ottoman palace, is now a five-star hotel in the Kempinski Hotels chain. It is located on the European shore of the Bosporus, between Beşiktaş and Ortaköy in Istanbul, Turkey.

The Sultan Suite, billed at US$35,419.68 per night, is ranked number 14 on World's 15 most expensive hotel suites compiled by CNN Go in 2012.

== History ==
The palace, built by Sultan Abdulaziz to replace the old Çırağan Palace which was at the same location, was designed by the Armenian palace architect Nigoğayos Balyan and constructed by his sons Sarkis and Hagop Balyan between 1863 and 1867, during a period in which all Ottoman sultans built their own palaces rather than using those of their ancestors; Çırağan Palace is the last example of this tradition. The inner walls and the roof were made of wood, the outer walls of colorful marble. A beautiful marble bridge connects the palace to the Yıldız Palace on the hill behind. A very high garden wall protects the palace from the outer world.

The construction and the interior decoration of the palace continued until 1872. Sultan Abdulaziz did not live long in his magnificent palace - he was found dead inside on 30 May 1876, shortly after he was dethroned. His successor, his nephew Sultan Murad V, moved into Çırağan Palace, but reigned for only 93 days. He was deposed by his brother Abdul Hamid II due to alleged mental illness and lived there under house arrest until his death on 29 August 1904.

On November 14, 1909, during the Second Constitutional Monarchy, Sultan Mehmed V allowed the Ottoman Parliament to hold their meetings in this building. Only two months later, on January 19, 1910, a great fire destroyed the palace, leaving only the outer walls intact. Called "Şeref Stadı", for many years its garden served as a football field for the club Beşiktaş J.K.

In 1987, the ruined palace was bought by a Japanese corporation, which restored it and added a modern hotel complex next to it in its garden. The modern hotel building was opened in 1990 and the restored palace building was opened in 1992. Today, it serves as luxury suites for the five-star Kempinski hotel along with two restaurants that cater to guests.

The palace was renovated again during the first quarter of 2007, now resembling the authentic palace with the baroque style and soft colors.

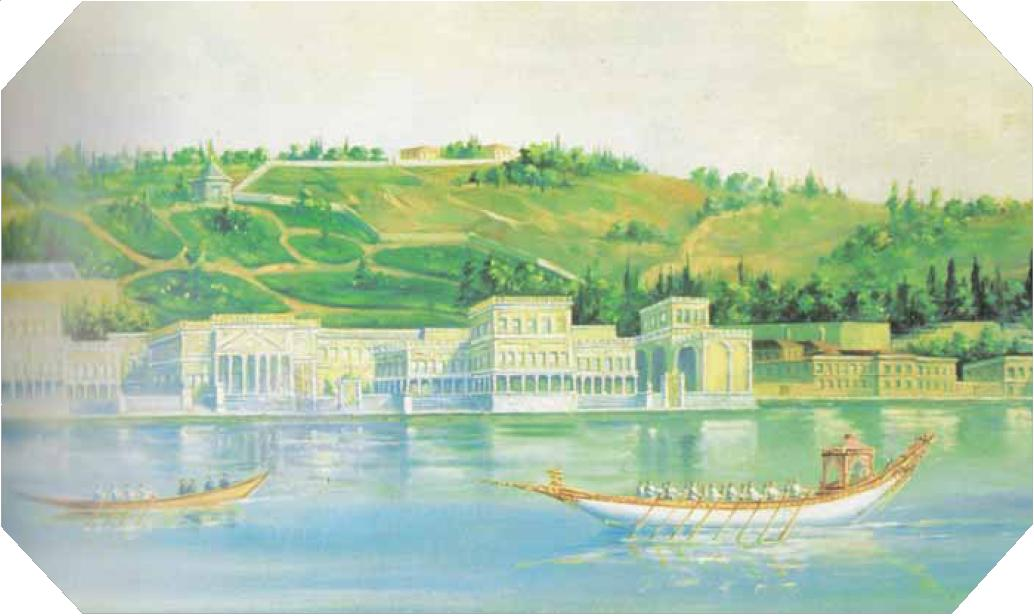
The old Çırağan Palace in 1840, which was replaced by the current one in 1863–1867

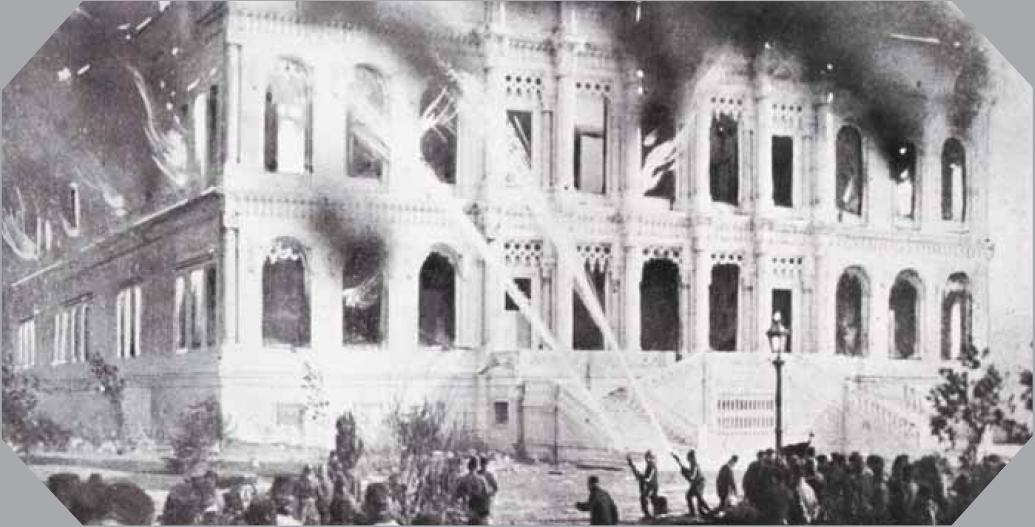
Çırağan Palace was damaged by fire in 1910

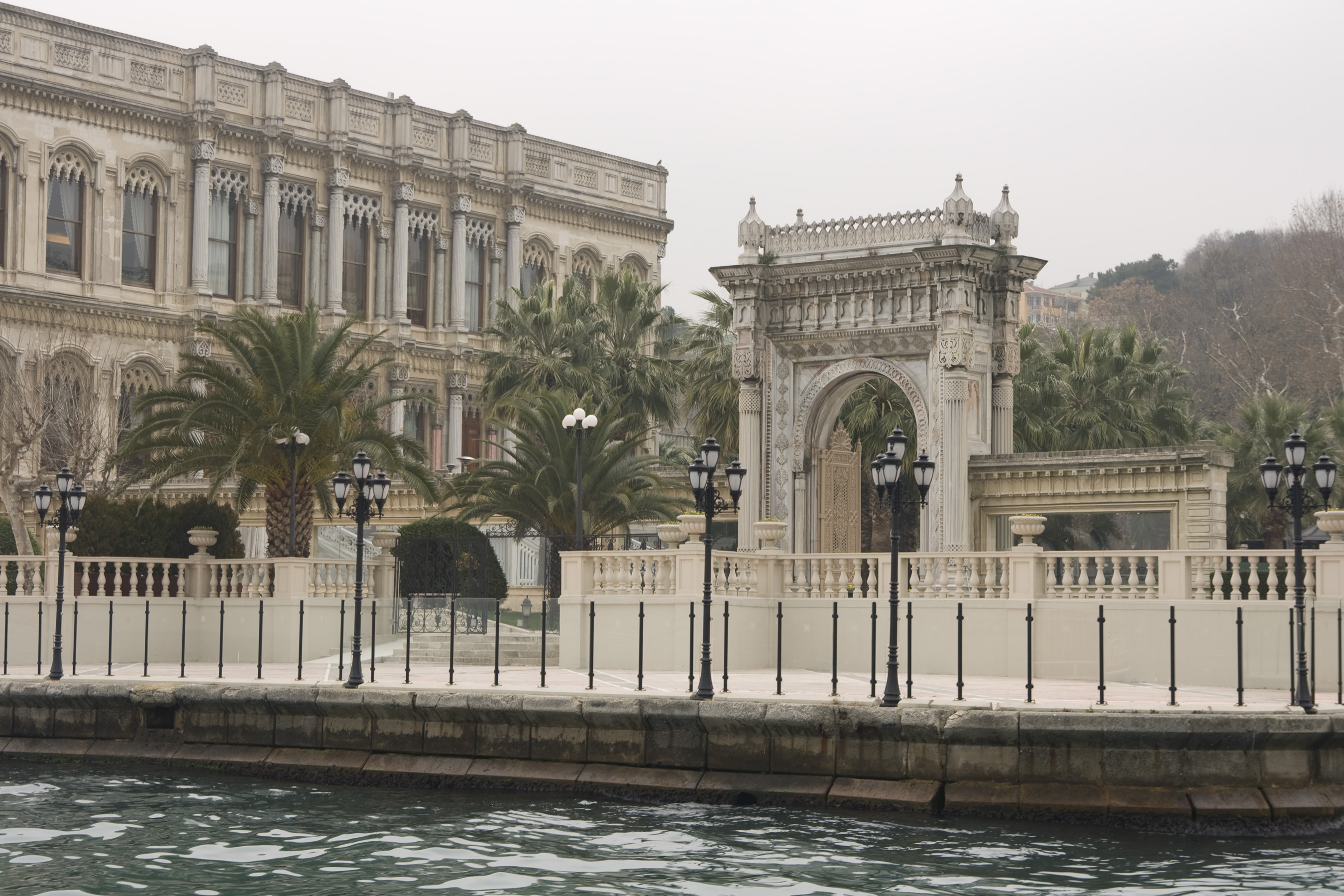
View of the gate from Bosphorus

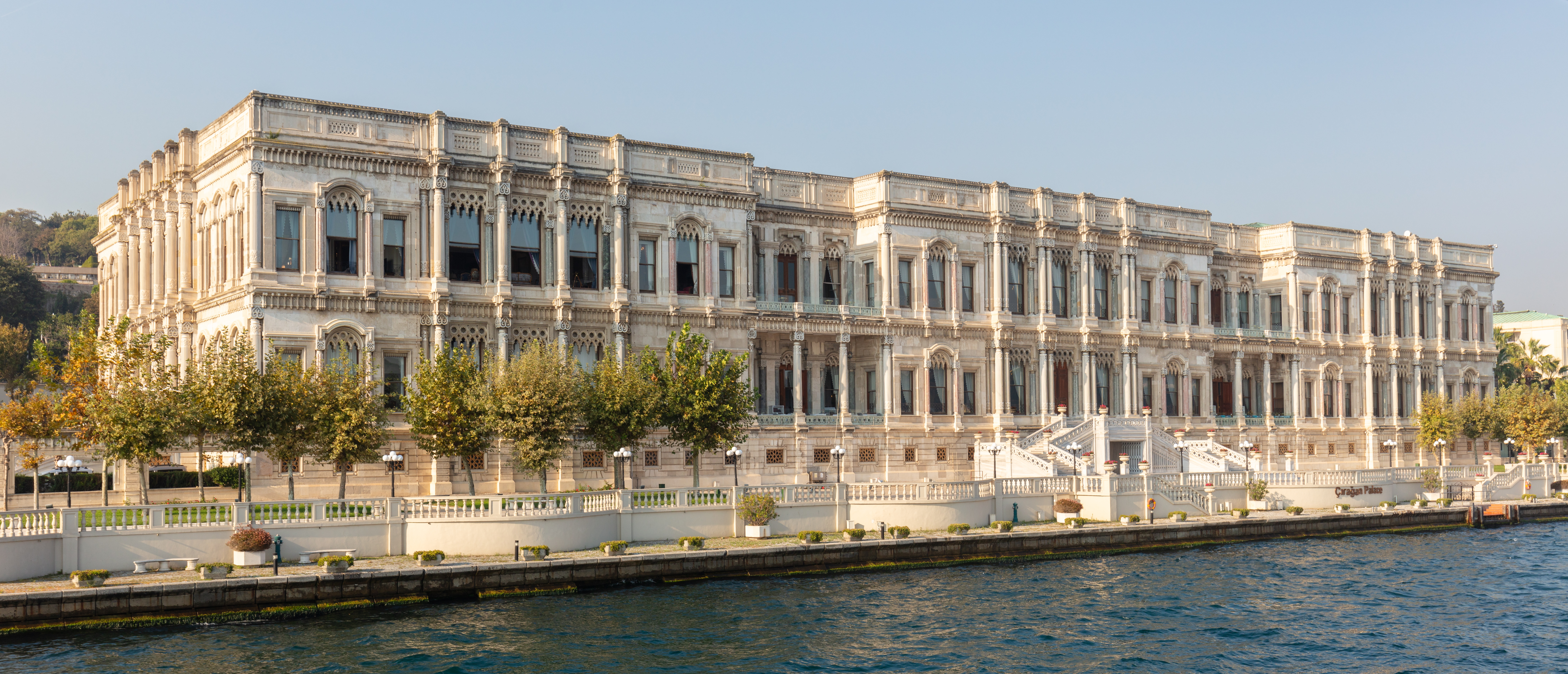
Side view from Bosphorus

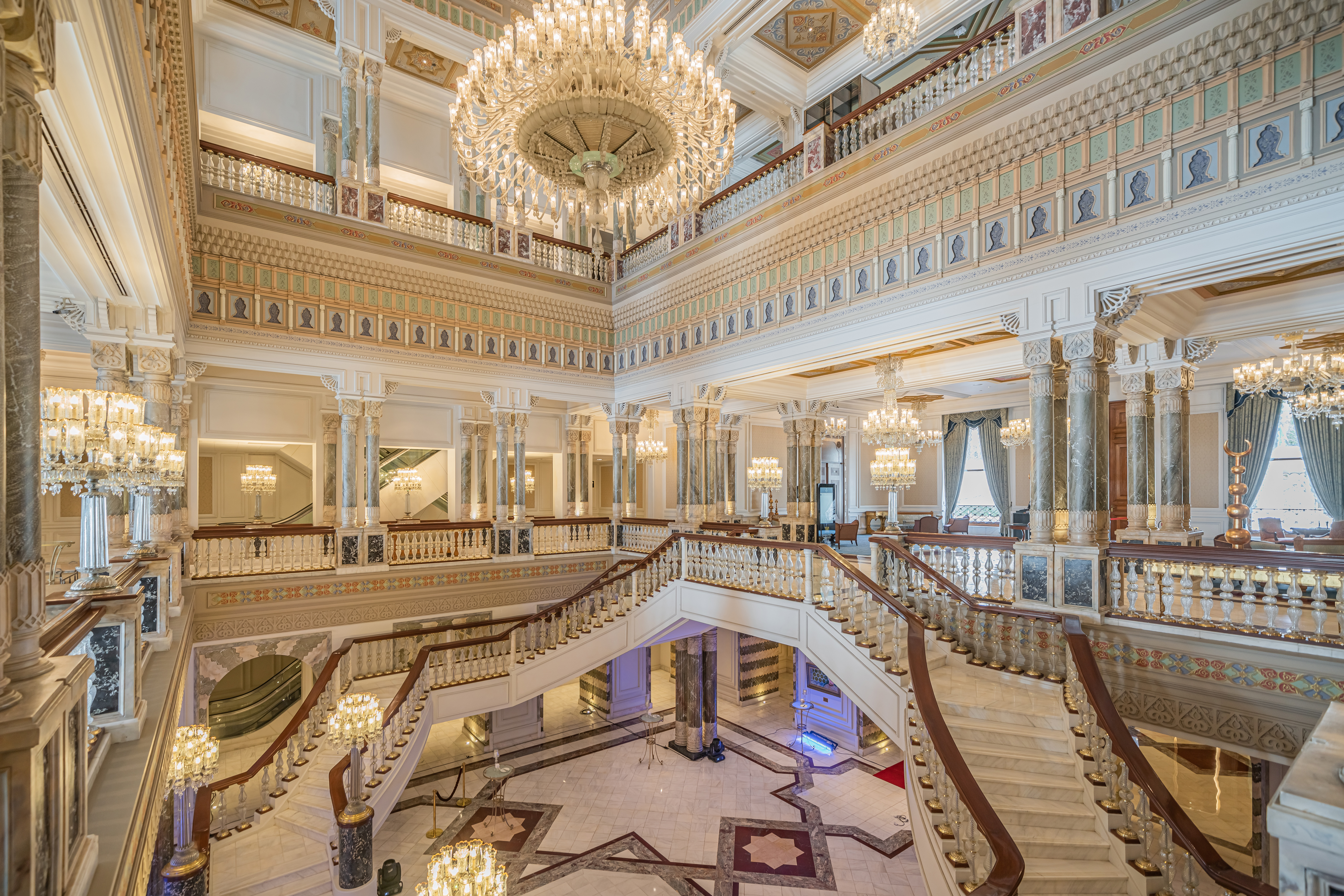
Atrium with staircase inside Çırağan Palace

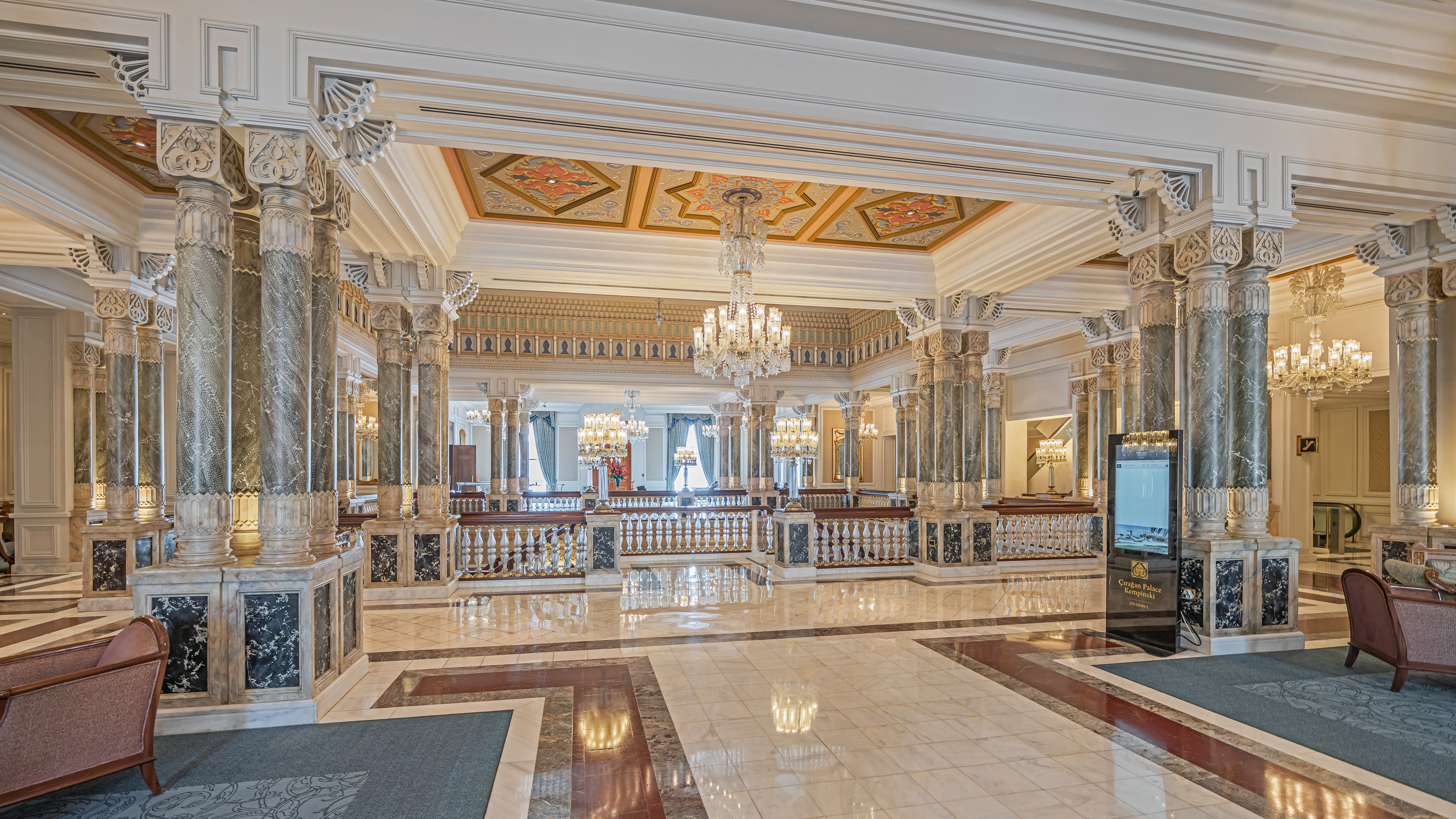
Atrium Hall inside Çırağan Palace

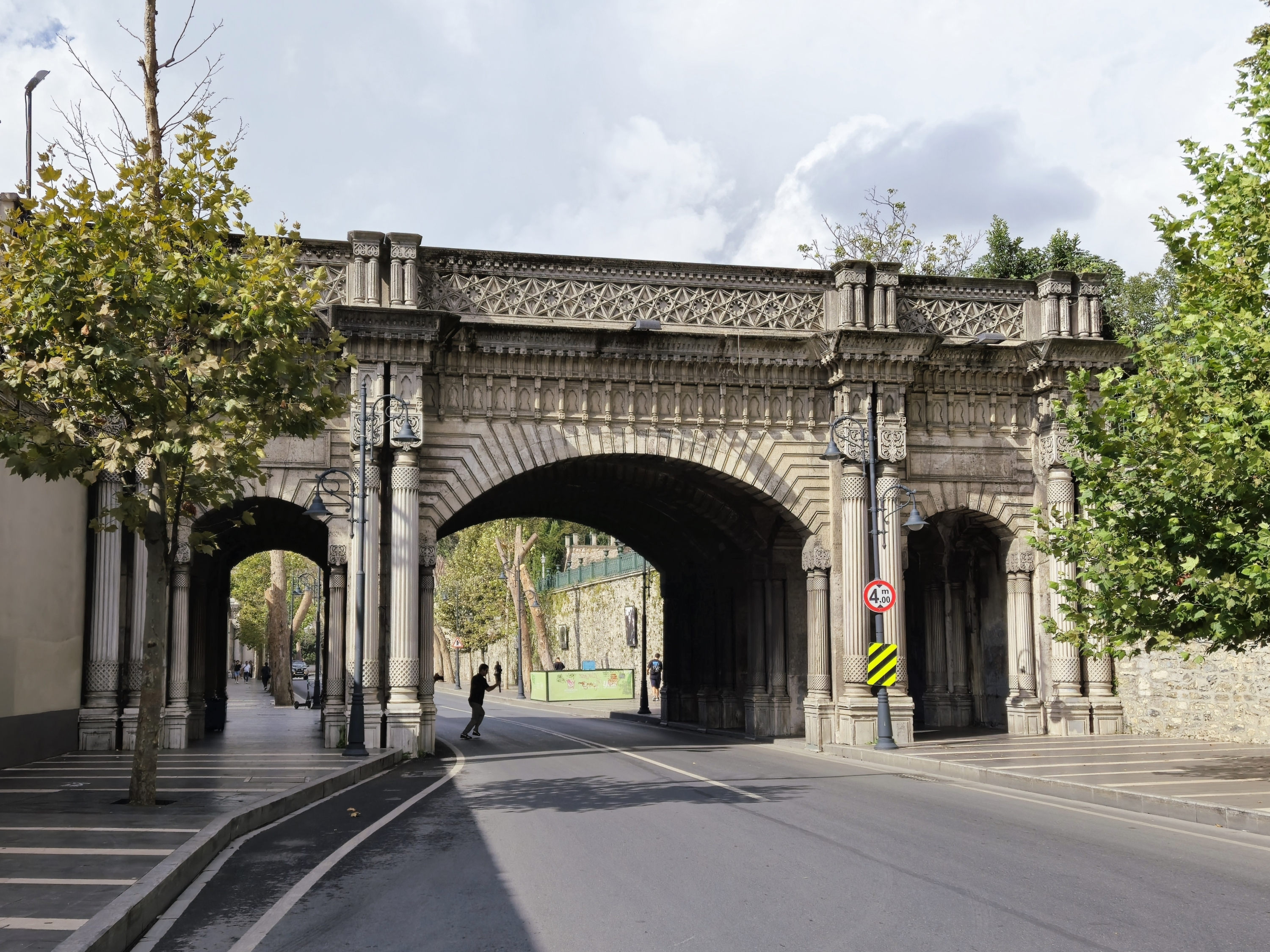
Yıldız Arc at Çırağan Avenue

== See also ==
- Hotels in Istanbul
- Ottoman architecture
- Ottoman palaces in Istanbul

== Literature ==
- Çelik Gülersoy. The Çerâğan palaces. Istanbul Kitaplığı, Istanbul (1992). ISBN 975-7687-08-1
