= Şehzade Mehmed Abdulaziz =

Head of the Osmanoğlu family
- Term: 19 May 1973 – 19 January 1977
- Predecessor: Şehzade Osman Fuad
- Successor: Şehzade Ali Vasib
- Born: 26 September 1901; Çırağan Palace, Istanbul, Ottoman Empire
- Died: 19 January 1977 (aged 75); Nice, France
- Spouse: Berkemal Hanım (m. 1929; died 1962)
- Issue: Hürrem Sultan
- House: Ottoman
- Father: Şehzade Mehmed Seyfeddin
- Mother: Neşefelek Hanım

Şehzade Mehmed Abdulaziz Efendi (Ottoman Turkish: محمد عبد العزیز; also Mehmed Abdülaziz Osmanoğlu; 26 September 1901 – 19 January 1977) was an Ottoman prince, the son of Şehzade Mehmed Seyfeddin, and grandson of Sultan Abdulaziz. He was the 40th head of the Ottoman dynasty from 1973 to 1977.

== Early life ==
Şehzade Mehmed Abdulaziz was born on 26 September 1901 in the Ortaköy Palace. His father was Şehzade Mehmed Seyfeddin, son of Sultan Abdulaziz and Gevheri Kadın, and his mother was Neşefelek Hanım. He was the eldest child of his father and the only child of his mother. He had two younger half-brothers Şehzade Mahmud Şevket and Şehzade Ahmed Tevhid and a younger half-sister Fatma Gevheri Sultan. He was educated at the Ottoman Military College.

At the exile of the imperial family in March 1924, Abdulaziz and his family moved to Cimiez, Nice, France. They bought a villa near the Villa Carabacel which belonged to Seniha Sultan, daughter of Sultan Abdulmejid I. Here his father died in 1927. Abdulaziz then settled in Cairo, Egypt.

== Personal life ==
Mehmed Abdulaziz's only wife was Berkemal Hanım. She was the eldest daughter of Ali Reza Bey of the Yeğen family, a family related to Muhammad Ali Pasha, and his wife Nimet Hanım. She was born on 16 March 1911 in Cairo. They married on 21 February 1929 in Cairo. The couple had one daughter, Hürrem Sultan, born on 31 December 1939. Berkemal died on 13 January 1962. One of her younger sisters, Nafia Hanım, was married to Mehmed Orhan, the 42nd head of the Ottoman dynasty from 1983 to 1994, and was the mother of Fatma Necla Sultan.

== Later life and death ==
Şehzade Ahmed Nihad became the head of the exiled Imperial family in August 1944, following the death of Abdulmejid II. But Şehzade Ömer Faruk did not accept him as head of the family. On the other hand his wife Sabiha Sultan backed the council's decision and approved the choice of the leader. On this occasion Mehmed Abdulaziz, and his cousins Şükriye Sultan, and Mihrişah Sultan, sided with Ömer Faruk.

After the Egyptian revolution of 1952, President Gamal Abdel Nasser expelled him from Egypt, after his refusal to accepted Egypt's identity law. He then went to Nice, France with the help of the then president of France Charles de Gaulle, who gave him French passport. He was also given a monthly salary of fifty thousand francs.

In 1973, after the death of Şehzade Osman Fuad, he became the 40th head of the Ottoman dynasty. He died on 19 January 1977 in Nice, France, and was buried there in the East Side cemetery in Nice.

== Issue ==
Name	Birth	Death	Notes
Hürrem Sultan	31 December 1939	5 March 1999	born in Cairo, Egypt; died unmarried in Nice, France, and buried there;

== Ancestry ==
Ancestors of Şehzade Mehmed Abdulaziz

8. Mahmud II
4. Abdulaziz
9. Pertevniyal Sultan
2. Şehzade Mehmed Seyfeddin
10. Salih Bey
5. Gevheri Kadın
11. Şaziye Hanim
1. Mehmed Abdulaziz
3. Neşefelek Hanım

== See also ==
- Line of succession to the former Ottoman throne

Şehzade Mehmed Abdulaziz House of Osman Born: 26 September 1901 Died: 19 January 1977
Preceded by Osman Fuad	Head of the Osmanoğlu family 19 May 1973 – 19 January 1977	Succeeded by Ali Vâsib
