= Şehzade Ahmed Tevhid =

Ottoman Prince, descendant of Sultan Abdülaziz

- Born: 2 December 1904; Küçük Çamlıca Villa, Üsküdar, Constantinople, Ottoman Empire (now Istanbul, Turkey)
- Died: 24 April 1966 (aged 61); Beirut, Lebanon
- Burial: Beirut, Lebanon
Names
- Turkish: Şehzade Ahmed Tevhid; Ottoman Turkish: شهزاده احمد توحید
- Dynasty: Ottoman
- Father: Şehzade Mehmed Seyfeddin
- Mother: Nervaliter Hanım
- Religion: Sunni Islam
- Military career
- Allegiance: Ottoman Empire
- Branch: Ottoman Navy
- Service years: 1918–1922 (active service)
- Rank: See list

Şehzade Ahmed Tevhid Efendi (Ottoman Turkish: شهزادہ احمد توحید; also Ahmed Tevhid Osmanoğlu, 2 December 1904 – 24 April 1966) was an Ottoman prince, son of Şehzade Mehmed Seyfeddin, and the grandson of Sultan Abdulaziz.

== Biography ==
Şehzade Ahmed Tevhid was born on 2 December 1904 in his father's villa in Küçük Çamlıca, Üsküdar. His father was Şehzade Mehmed Seyfeddin, son of Sultan Abdulaziz and Gevheri Kadın, and his mother was Nervaliter Hanım. He had a twin sister, Gevheri Sultan, a brother, Şehzade Mahmud Şevket, one year elder than him, and an older half-brother Şehzade Mehmed Abdulaziz.

Şevket began his education in the princes school located in the Ihlamur Pavilion. On 5 June 1918, he was enrolled in the Imperial Naval School located on Heybeliada Island. On 9 July 1918, he was given the rank of junior officer in the navy. A few months later, his education in the naval school ended, and he was sent back to Ihlamur Pavilion for military training. However, after the Armistice of Mudros in October 1918, his education in the Ihlamur Pavilion ended. In April 1922, his education in the naval school also ended because he did not take his lessons regularly, and it was decided that he would be educated by private teachers.

Upon the exile of the imperial family in March 1924, Tevhide, and his family moved to Beirut, Lebanon, then to Rome, Italy, and finally to Cimiez, Nice, France. They bought a villa near the Villa Carabacel which belonged to his uncle Abdülmecid II and where Seniha Sultan, daughter of Sultan Abdulmejid I, also lived. Here his father died in 1927. In 1940, Tevhid settled in Cairo, Egypt. He died unmarried on 24 April 1966 at the age of sixty-one in Beirut, Lebanon, and was buried there.

== Honours ==
Styles of Şehzade Ahmed Tevhid
- Reference style: His Imperial Highness
- Spoken style: Your Imperial Highness

=== Military ranks and naval appointments ===
- 9 July 1918: Junior Officer, Ottoman Navy

== Ancestry ==
Ancestors of Şehzade Ahmed Tevhid

8. Mahmud II
4. Abdulaziz
9. Pertevniyal Sultan
2. Şehzade Mehmed Seyfeddin
5. Gevheri Kadın
1. Şehzade Ahmed Tevhid
3. Nervaliter Hanım

== Sources ==
- Korkmaz, Mehmet (2019-12-30). "Denizin Saraylıları: Bahriye'de Osmanlı Şehzadeleri". Hazine-i Evrak Arşiv ve Tarih Araştırmaları Dergisi (in Turkish). 1 (1): 42–65.
