= Mihrişah =

Mihrişah may refer to:

- Mihrişah Kadın (d. 1732), consort of Ottoman Sultan Ahmed III, and the mother of Mustafa III
- Mihrişah Sultan (mother of Selim III) (1745–1805), consort of Ottoman Sultan Mustafa III, and the mother and valide sultan of Ottoman Sultan Selim III
- Mihrişah Sultan (daughter of Şehzade Izzeddin) (1916–1987), Ottoman princess, daughter of Şehzade Yusuf Izzeddin and granddaughter of Sultan Abdülaziz
