= Abdulaziz II =

Abdulaziz II may refer to:

- Abu Faris Abd al-Aziz II (reigned 1394–1434), Hafsid Caliph of Ifriqiya
- Mehmed Abdulaziz or Abdulaziz II (1901–1977), 40th Head of the Ottoman Dynasty
