= Saliha Sultan =

Saliha Sultan may refer to:

- Saliha Dilaşub Sultan (died 1690), second Haseki of Sultan Ibrahim and mother and the Valide Sultan of Sultan Suleiman II
- Saliha Sultan (mother of Mahmud I) (1680–1739), consort of Sultan Mustafa II and mother and Valide Sultan of Sultan Mahmud I
- Saliha Sultan (daughter of Ahmed III) (1715–1778), Ottoman princess
- Saliha Sultan (daughter of Mahmud II) (1811–1843), Ottoman princess
- Saliha Verdicenan Kadın (1825 - 1889), consort of the Ottoman Sultan Abdulmecid I
- Saliha Sultan (daughter of Abdülaziz) (1862–1941), Ottoman princess
- Saliha Naciye Kadın (1887 - 1923), consort of the Ottoman Sultan Abdulhamid II
