= Şehzade Mehmed Nizameddin =

Ottoman Prince, Son of Şehzade Yusuf Izzeddin

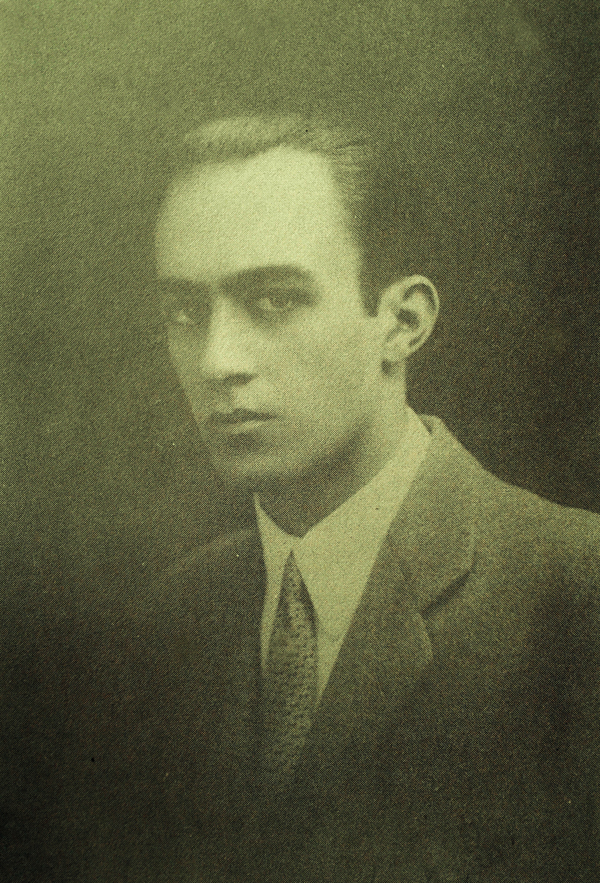
- Born: 18 December 1908; Beşiktaş Palace, Constantinople, Ottoman Empire (now Istanbul, Turkey)
- Died: 19 March 1933 (aged 24); Locarno, Switzerland
- Burial: Sultan Mahmud II Mausoleum, Divanyolu, Istanbul
Names
- Turkish: Şehzade Mehmed Nizameddin; Ottoman Turkish: شهزادہ محمد نظام الدین
- Dynasty: Ottoman
- Father: Şehzade Yusuf Izzeddin
- Mother: Leman Hanım
- Religion: Sunni Islam
- Military career
- Allegiance: Ottoman Empire
- Branch: Ottoman Empire
- Service years: c. 1918–1922 (active service)
- Rank: See list

Şehzade Mehmed Nizameddin Efendi (Ottoman Turkish: شهزادہ محمد نظام الدین; 18 December 1908 – 19 March 1933) was an Ottoman prince, the son of Şehzade Yusuf Izzeddin and the grandson of Sultan Abdulaziz.

== Biography ==
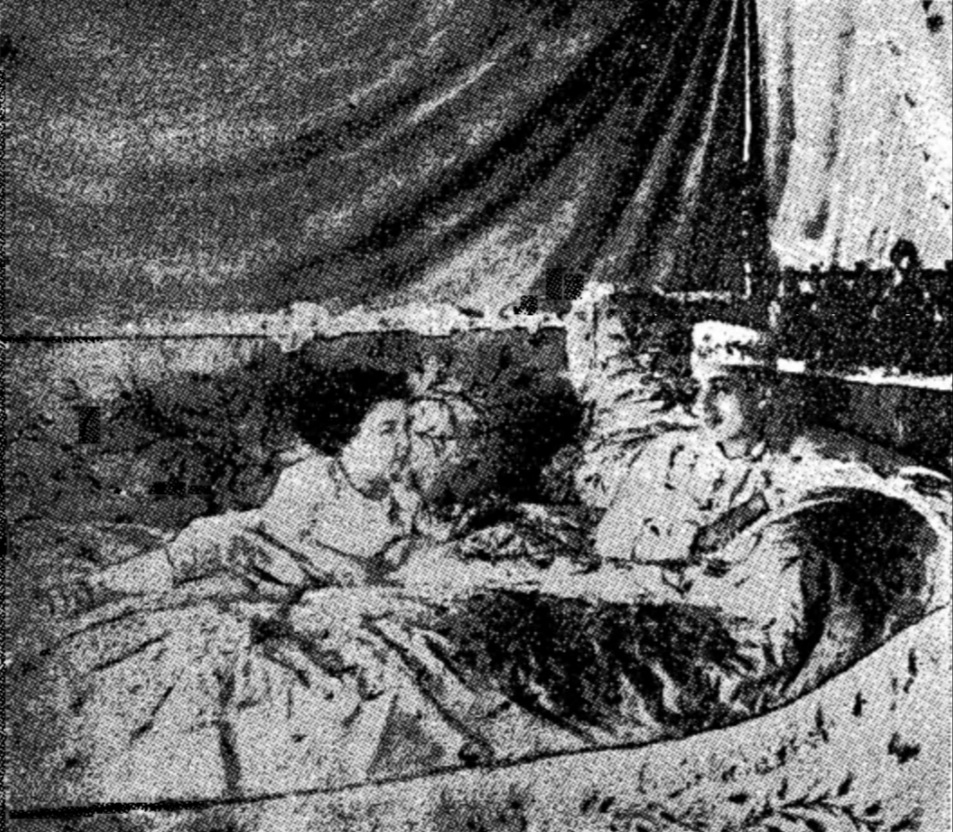
Nizameddin (right) and his sister Mihrişah Sultan

Şehzade Mehmed Nizameddin was born on 18 December 1908 in the Beşiktaş Palace. His father was Şehzade Yusuf Izzeddin, son of Sultan Abdulaziz and Dürrünev Kadın and his mother was Leman Hanım, a Circassian. He had two sisters, Şükriye Sultan, two years older than him, and Mihrişah Sultan, seven years younger than him. He was the third child and second son of his father, and the second child of his mother.

After his father committed suicide in 1916, Nizameddin, his mother and sisters resided as guests in Dolmabahçe Palace for four months as she sought the distribution of the estate of the late prince from Sultan Mehmed V. He was educated at the princes school. By 1918 he was serving in the Ottoman army as sergeant in the unit of Infantry, a part of the second general staff.

Upon the exile of the imperial family in March 1924, Nizameddin and his sister Mihrişah settled in Romania. In exile, Nizameddin led an unhealthy lifestyle which made him ill, after which his mother came to stay with him for a while. On the other hand, his sister Şükriye took Mihrişah with her to Cairo, Egypt. He had begun drinking and had tuberculosis. At the doctor's recommendation, Nizameddin went to Locarno, Switzerland, for treatment in 1931. However, by this time his disease had become incurable.

Osman Fuad came to see him in Switzerland. Nizameddin died on 19 March 1933, and Osman Fuad carried his body to Cairo, Egypt, where he was buried. On 16 August 1967, he was reburied in the mausoleum of his great grandfather Sultan Mahmud II located in Divanyolu, Istanbul.

== Honours ==
Styles of Şehzade Mehmed Nizameddin
- Reference style: His Imperial Highness
- Spoken style: Your Imperial Highness

- Order of the House of Osman

=== Military appointments ===
==== Military ranks and army appointments ====
- c. 1918: Sergeant in the Infantry, Ottoman Army

== Ancestry ==
Ancestors of Şehzade Mehmed Nizameddin

8. Mahmud II
4. Abdulaziz
9. Pertevniyal Sultan
2. Şehzade Yusuf Izzeddin
10. Mahmud Dziapş-lpa
5. Dürrünev Kadın
11. Halime Çikotua
1. Şehzade Mehemd Nizameddin
3. Leman Hanım

== Sources ==
- Ünlü, Hasan (2019). Veliahd Yusuf İzzeddin Efendi (1857–1916) (Thesis). Mimar Sinan Fine Art University Institute of Social Sciences.
