= Gevheri Sultan =

Ottoman princess, Daughter of Şehzade Mehmed Seyfeddin

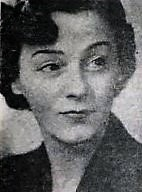
- Born: 2 December 1904; Küçük Çamlıca Villa, Üsküdar, Constantinople, Ottoman Empire
- Died: 10 December 1980 (aged 76); Taksim Square, Istanbul, Turkey
- Burial: Sultan Mahmud II Mausoleum, Divanyolu, Istanbul
Names
- Turkish: Fatma Gevheri Sultan; Ottoman Turkish: فاطمه کوھری سلطان
- Dynasty: Ottoman
- Father: Şehzade Mehmed Seyfeddin
- Mother: Nervaliter Hanım
- Religion: Sunni Islam

Fatma Gevheri Sultan (Ottoman Turkish: فاطمه کوھری سلطان; also Fatma Gevheri Osmanoğlu; 2 December 1904 – 10 December 1980) was an Ottoman princess, musician, and composer. She was the daughter of Şehzade Mehmed Seyfeddin, son of Sultan Abdulaziz.

== Early life ==
Gevheri Sultan was born on 2 December 1904 in her father's villa in Küçük Çamlıca, Üsküdar. Her father was Şehzade Mehmed Seyfeddin, son of Abdulaziz and Gevheri Kadın, and her mother was Nervaliter Hanım. She was the only daughter born to her father. She had a twin brother, Şehzade Ahmed Tevhid. She also had an elder full brother, Şehzade Mahmud Şevket, one year older than her, and an older half-brother Şehzade Mehmed Abdulaziz. She was named after her paternal grandmother.

Gevheri, who used to attend her father's musical lessons during her childhood, took tanbur and kemence lessons from Tanbûri Cemil Bey.

== Exile ==
Upon the exile of the imperial family in March 1924, Gevheri and her family moved to Nice, France, where they settled in a villa at Cimiez, After her father's death in 1927, her family was scattered here and there. She was still living there and was striving to make ends meet. Abdulmejid II, her uncle who was also living in Nice, brought her to his home when he heard of her financial difficulties with the intention of finding her a husband.

Gevheri lived with her uncle's family for a few years, then became engaged to the son of a minor raja from India, but a short time before her wedding it was discovered that she was having an affair with someone else, so the engagement was canceled. Her uncle was so angry that he sent her to stay with her mother, who barely had anything to live on.

== As musician ==
Gevheri Sultan learned to play several instruments from her father. Among these were the oud (a lyre), the tanbur (a guitar-like instrument), and the lavta (an ancient lute). She played the tanbur, kemençe, ud, lavta, piano, violin and drums. She composed vocal and instrumental pieces in various makams. Though she did not continue her studies of Turkish music until her return to her country, she became very skilled on the tanbur in later life. Her work is preserved in recordings made by Turkish radio and TV.

Her father Mehmed Seyfeddin was known as great composer after Selim III. He used to play piano, fiddle, drums and composed them with a good tune. Her half-brother Mehmed Abdulaziz, and brothers Şehzade Mahmud Şevket and Şehzade Ahmed Tevhid were master drummers.

== Later years and death ==
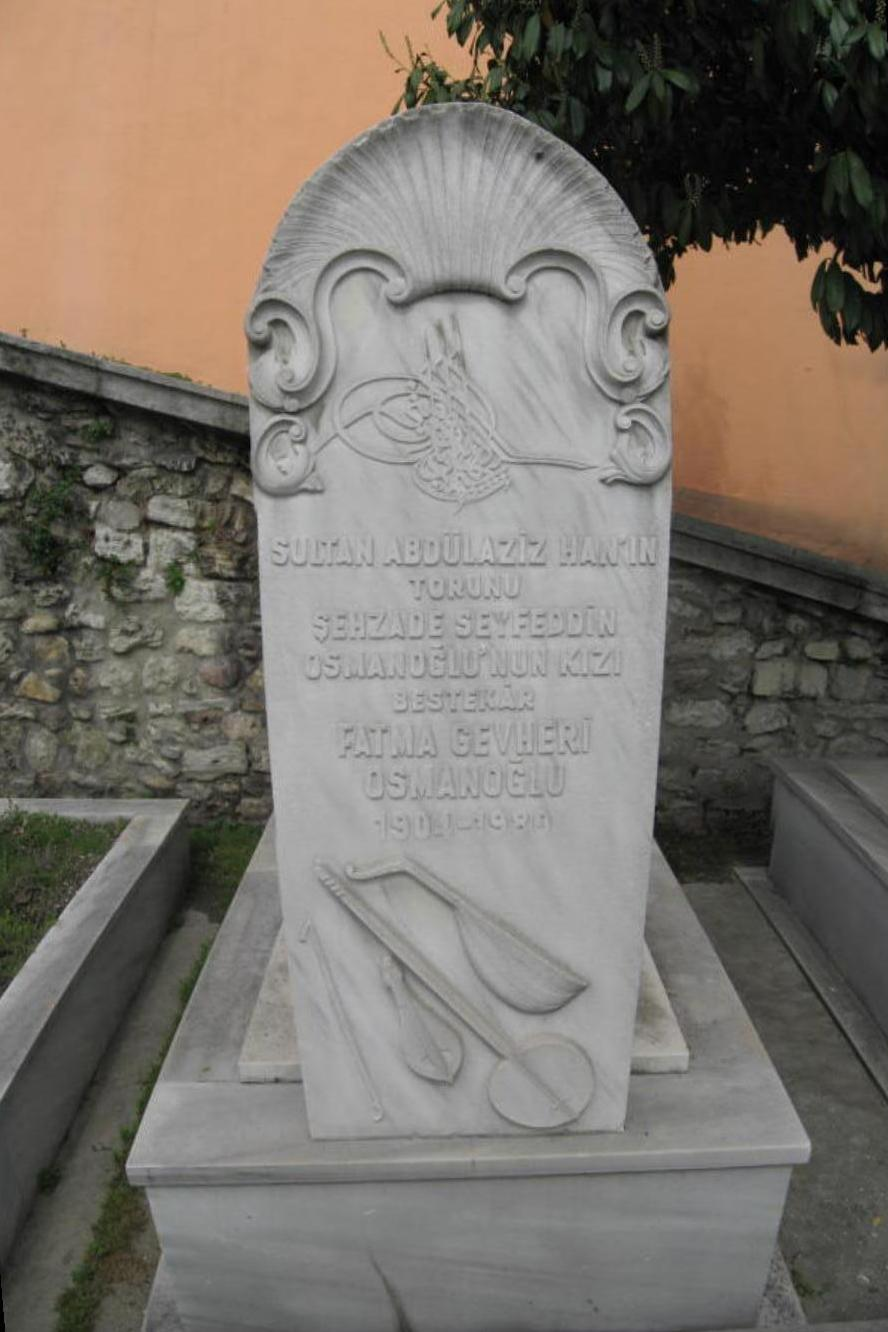
The grave of Gevheri Sultan in Mahmud II Mausoleum

In 1952, Gevheri returned to Istanbul after the revocation of the law of exile for princesses. She spent her last years with her cousin Mihrişah Sultan, daughter of her uncle crown prince Şehzade Yusuf Izzeddin, in a spacious apartment in Taksim Square. She died on 10 December 1980 at the age of seventy-six, and was buried in the mausoleum of her great-grandfather Sultan Mahmud II, Divanyolu, Istanbul.

== Sources ==
- Bardakçı, Murat (2017). Neslishah: The Last Ottoman Princess. Oxford University Press. ISBN 978-9-774-16837-6.
