= Şehzade Yusuf Izzeddin =

Ottoman prince, son of Sultan Abdülaziz

Yusuf Izzeddin
- Şehzade
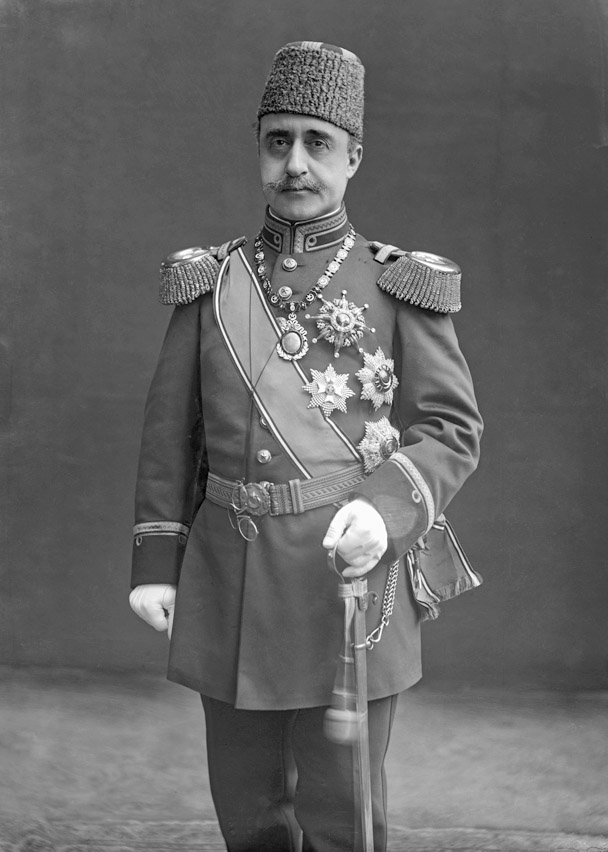
- At Windsor, 1911

Crown Prince of Ottoman Empire
- Tenure: 27 April 1909 – February 1916
- Predecessor: Mehmed V as Sultan of Ottoman
- Successor: Şehzade Mehmed Vahideddin
- Sultan: Mehmed V
- Born: 29 September 1857; Dolmabahçe Palace, Istanbul, Ottoman Empire
- Died: 1 February 1916 (aged 58); Zincirlikuyu Villa, Zincirlikuyu, Şişli, Istanbul, Ottoman Empire
- Burial: Tomb of Mahmud II, Çemberlitaş, Fatih, Istanbul
- Spouse: Ceşmiahu Hanım (m. 1879; died 1912) Cavidan Hanım (m. 1885) Nazikeda Hanım (m. 1886) Tazende Hanım (m. 1892): Ebruniyaz Hanım; Leman Hanım (m. 1904)
- Issue: Sehzade Mehmed Bahaeddin; Hatice Şükriye Sultan; Şehzade Mehmed Nizameddin; Mihriban Mihrişah Sultan
Names
- Turkish: Şehzade Yusuf Izzeddin; Ottoman Turkish: شهزادہ یوسف عزالدین
- House: Ottoman
- Father: Abdulaziz
- Mother: Dürrinev Kadın
- Religion: Sunni Islam
- Military career
- Allegiance: Ottoman Empire
- Branch: Ottoman Army
- Service years: 1861–1916 (active service)
- Rank: See list

Şehzade Yusuf Izzeddin Efendi (Ottoman Turkish: شهزادہ یوسف عزالدین; Turkish: Yusuf İzzettin Efendi; 29 September 1857 – 1 February 1916) was an Ottoman prince, the eldest son of Sultan Abdülaziz and his first consort Dürrinev Kadın.

== Early life and education ==
Şehzade Yusuf Izzeddin was born on 29 September 1857 in the Dolmabahçe Palace. His father was Sultan Abdulaziz, who was then a prince, and his mother was Dürrünev Kadın, eldest daughter of Prince Mahmud Dziapş-lpa and his wife Princess Halime Çikotua. He had a full sister, Fatma Saliha Sultan, five years younger than him, and a full brother, Şehzade Mehmed Selim, nine years younger than him. He was brought up concealed in the villa of Kadir Bey, molla of Mecca, located in Eyüp, because at the time it was forbidden for the Ottoman princes to have children before ascending the throne. His birth was kept a secret until his father ascended the throne in 1861.

Izzeddin's early education took place in the Prince's School, Dolmabahçe Palace. His tutors were Miralay Süleyman Bey, Ömer Efendi, Tophane Müfti Ömer Lutfi Efendi, Gazi Ahmed Muhtar Pasha, and Gürcü Şerif Efendi. He took his French lessons from the Sultan's head doctor Marko Pasha, and Sakızlı Ohannes Pasha's son-in-law Şarl.

Izzeddin was circumcised on 20 June 1870. Other princes who were circumcised along with Izzeddin included Şehzade Selim Süleyman and Şehzade Mehmed Vahideddin, sons of Sultan Abdulmejid I; Şehzade Mehmed Selaheddin, son of crown prince Murad; Şehzade Mahmud Celaleddin, Izzeddin's own brother; and Sultanzade Alaeddin Bey, son of Münire Sultan, daughter of Abdulmejid.

== Military career and public life ==
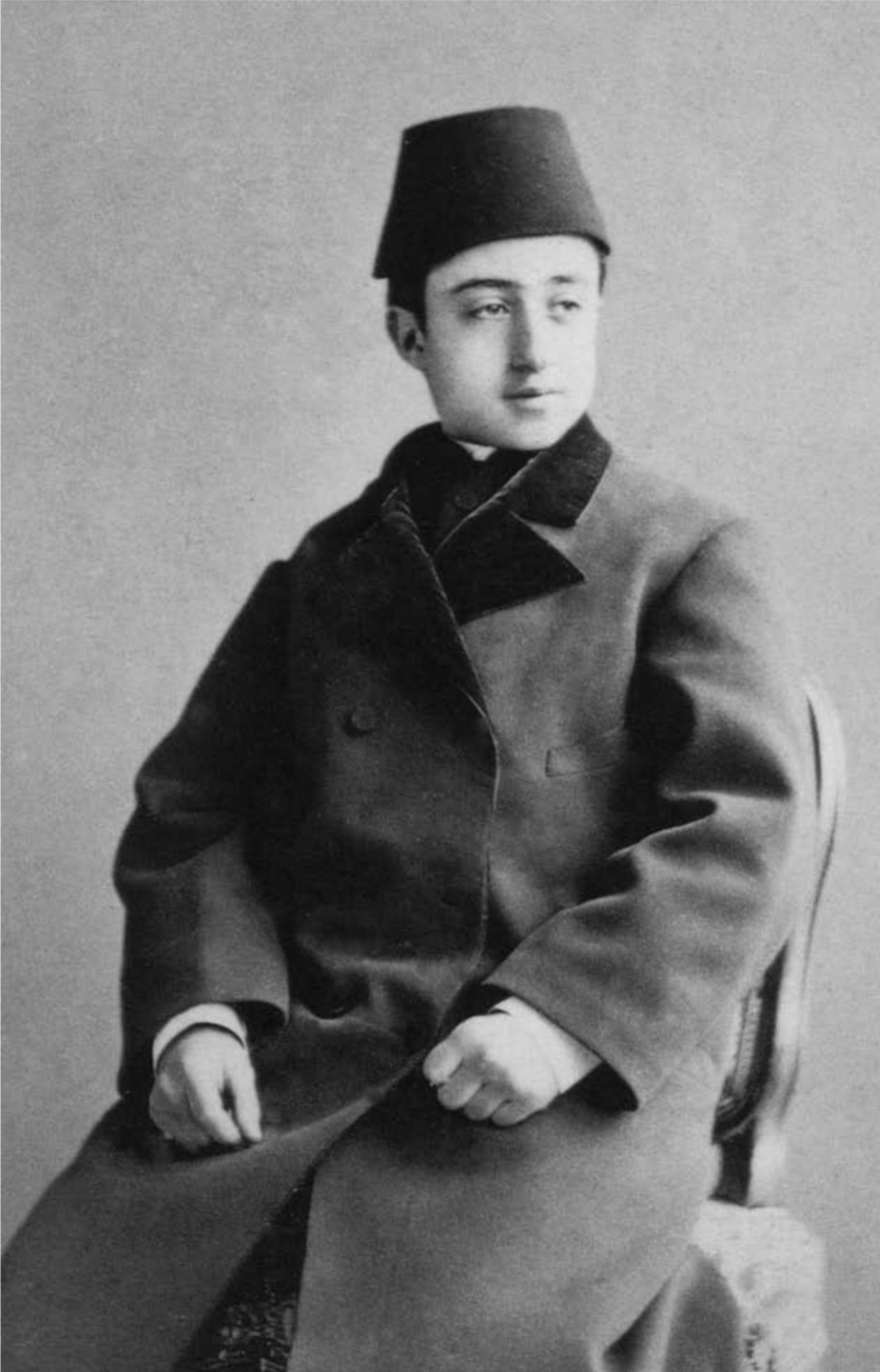
Şehzade Yusuf Izzeddin, at age sixteen in 1873

In November 1861, Izzeddin, then a child of four, was enlisted in the army and was quickly promoted. On 2 September 1862 and 3 April 1863, his father took him along a trip to Izmit and Egypt respectively. In 1866, then nine years of age, he was appointed Lieutenant colonel in the imperial Ottoman Army, and was screaming commands to his battalion in his child's voice during a parade at Pangatlı when Prince Karl von Hohenzollern-Sigmaringen visited Istanbul in October, 1866. A fountain was commissioned in Tophane in his name that same year.

On 3 September 1867, aged ten, Izzeddin received the rank of Colonel, and his father took him along a trip to the European capitals. On 15 July 1868, he was promoted to the rank of Brigadier of the Pure Infantry Regiment in the First Imperial Army. In 1868 he met Napoleon III and the Empress Eugénie. In 1869, he met the Prince of Wales Edward (future Edward VII) and Princess of Wales Alexandra of Denmark, when they visited Istanbul. On 30 May 1870, he was given the rank of Brigadier of the Pure Infantry Regiment of both the First and the Second Imperial Army.

On 3 November 1871, at the age of fourteen, Izzeddin was appointed the Chief of Staff of the First Imperial Army with the rank of Lieutenant-General, and soon after, on 18 April 1872, was appointed commander of the First Army, the Imperial Army. In 1874, aged seventeen, he appeared with his father, right after the Grand vizier, the Şeyhülislam and the ministers at the awards ceremonies for graduates of the imperial, medical, and military schools. He delivered the congratulatory speech to the graduates.

== Succession question ==
After Abdülaziz's accession to the throne, Prince Murad became heir to the throne. However, Abdulaziz began considering changing the rule of succession in favour of Izzeddin, his favorite son. For this purpose Abdulaziz set out to mollify different pressure groups and have his son gain popularity among them.

During the 1867 visit to Europe, rumors spread that contrary to the rules of protocol Abdulaziz arranged Izzeddin's reception in Paris and London before the official heir, Prince Murad.

A new propaganda strategy was employed as pictures of Izzeddin appeared in the weekly journal "Ayine-i Vatan" ("The Mirror of the Motherland") in 1867. It was rumoured that Mehmed Arif, the editor, received a huge grant in return for his cooperation. In one of the pictures, Izzeddin was shown wearing a military uniform. He spent most of his teenage years in barracks, and many high-ranking military men, and higher level bureaucrats were given gifts in return for their support for this situation.

When the conservative Mahmud Nedim Pasha became the Grand Vizier in September 1871 he lent his support to Abdulaziz's plans. A whispering campaign was generated in the first months of 1872 to the effect that Abdulaziz had obtained the verbal approval of the Şeyhülislam and that the later would give a fatwa in favour of filial succession. Although the Palace denied the rumors, and Mahmud Nedim Pasha asserted that such a change was not on the agenda, Izzeddin was still being favoured in the protocol. An order sent by Vittorio Emanuele, the King of Italy, the official heir to the throne was presented to Izzeddin.

In 1874, his portrait and biography appeared on the front page of "L'Orient Illustre", a French language weekly published in Istanbul. Heretofore, only the portrait of the reigning Sultan had been published by that journal.

To further legitimize his plans, Abdulaziz tactically supported a change to primogeniture in the Muhammad Ali dynasty of Egypt. By granting primogeniture to Isma'il Pasha in 1866, Abdulaziz was clearly seeking to create a positive climate of opinion about a change in favour of his own son. Significantly, at this time the newspapers reported that a ship very much like the one owned by the Khedive was to be constructed for Izzeddin.

== Abdul Hamid's reign ==
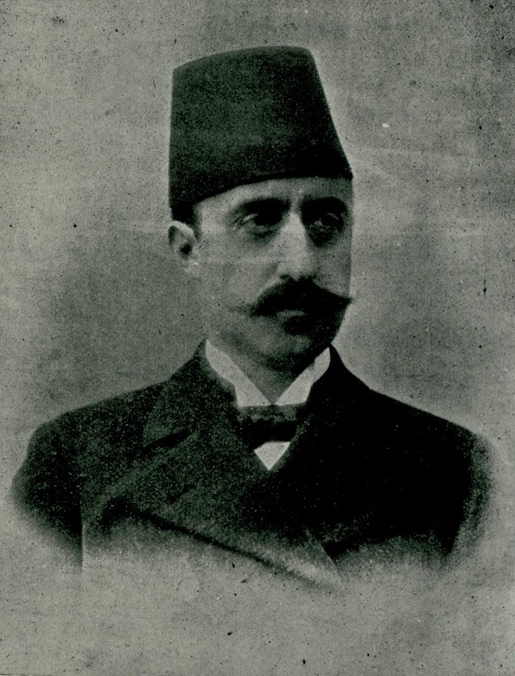
Şehzade Yusuf Izzeddin in 1908

Izzeddin's father, Abdulaziz was deposed by his ministers on 30 May 1876, and his nephew Murad became the Sultan. He was transferred to Feriye Palace the next day. On 4 June 1876, Abdulaziz died under mysterious circumstances. As both parents of Emine Sultan, Izzeddin's half-sister, died in the summer of 1876, when she was not yet two years old, Izzeddin raised her in his household. He welcomed also his half-siblings Esma Sultan and Şehzade Mehmed Seyfeddin, and their mother, Gevheri Kadin.

After reigning for three months, Murad was deposed on 30 August 1876. His half-brother, Sultan Abdul Hamid II, ascended the throne. After which Murad and his family were then confined to the Çırağan Palace. Abdul Hamid was suspicious of Izzeddin, and for this reason had a police station built opposite his country house. In 1906, some sources claimed that Izzeddin had plotted together with Ali Şamil Pasha, to depose the Sultan.

The Committee of Union and Progress considered parliamentarism and constitutionalism important because of the strength of the counterrevolutionary elements in the empire. Beyond that, the CUP was also quite respectful of the Ottoman dynasty and its policies were not anti-monarchist, and didn't wanted to establish a republican administration because they were aware that the Ottoman dynasty held the empire together. When it was rumoured that Abdul Hamid had attempted to change the system of succession in such a way as to leave the throne to his sons, the CUP had reacted against this fiercely. The CUP wanted, and were successful in gaining the support of the Ottoman princes for maintaining the existing customs, especially the support of Izzeddin, and the heir to the throne, Şehzade Mehmed Reşad (future Mehmed V).

== Crown prince ==
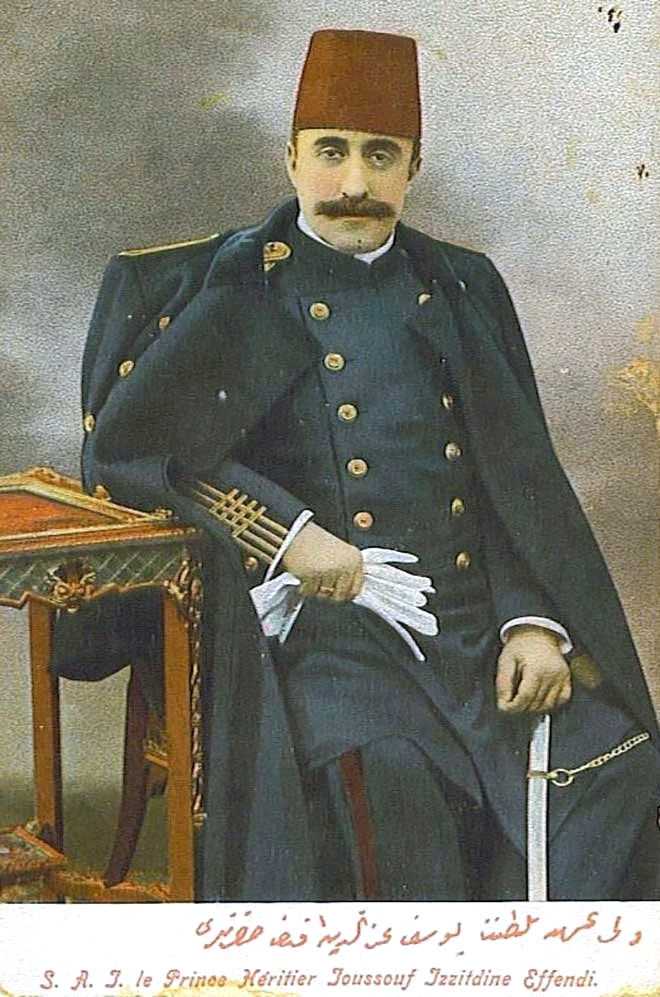
Şehzade Yusuf Izzeddin as crown prince

Izzeddin became heir (Valiahd Şehzade) to the throne upon the accession of his cousin Sultan Mehmed V on 27 April 1909. By 1910, he was serving as field marshal in the imperial army. In 1910 he represented the Ottoman dynasty in London on the occasion of the funeral of Edward VII. In 1911, Izzeddin met with Eugénie de Montijo, widow of Napoleon III, when she paid an unexpected visit to the Ottoman Empire. She had met him previously upon her visit to Istanbul in 1868.

He was also politically aware and active. He was known to be anti-CUP and was hostile to Sultan Mehmed's endorsement of the government's war strategy. However, as the CUP closely followed the contacts between the crown prince and anti-CUP politicians, and could control the public impact of their opposition, this did not amount to a significant threat. It was Sultan Mehmed who collaborated with the CUP in preventing the crown prince from engaging in politics.

On 14 May 1912, Izzeddin attended the ceremony marking the third anniversary of Sultan Mehmed's reign on Istanbul's Hill of Eternal Liberty. In July 1913, he visited the city of Edirne following its recapture from the Bulgarians during the Second Balkan War. In July 1915, he visited the Ottoman troops during the Gallipoli campaign. It is rumoured that his visit to Gallipoli provided the demonstration of the rift between the CUP and Izzeddin, who reprimanded Enver Pasha for sacrificing the lives of thousands of Ottoman soldiers in vain. In October 1915, Izzeddin and Sultan Mehmed welcomed the Syrian literati, regardless of the obstruction of Hulusi Bey, the governor of Syria.

Izzeddin and Prince Vahideddin (future Mehmed VI) had rivalry with each other. Though, coldly polite to each other, they refused to share the same carriage even for the ceremonies of the state. Vahideddin especially insisted on being considered the second heir apparent. In 1916, Vahideddin persuaded Sultan Mehmed to appoint him the Second Heir Apparent after Izzeddin. He feared that the CUP and Izzeddin, once he became the Sultan, might appoint an heir to the throne of their choice.

== Personal life ==
Izzeddin owned villas in Çamlıca, Zincirlikuyu, and Nişantaşı. He used to spend the winters in Çamlıca and the summers in Zincirlikuyu. The villa in Çamlıca had been given to him by Tiryal Hanim, one of the consorts of his paternal grandfather Mahmud II. Tiryal loved Abdülaziz as her own son and Izzeddin as her own grandson. After he became the crown prince in 1909, he was allocated the apartments of the crown prince located in the Dolmabahçe Palace.

He married six times and had four children. His first wife was Çeşmiahu Hanım. She was born between 1854 and 1856. She was a Circassian from the Ubykh tribe. Her mother was Mestare Hanım. They married in 1879. Four years later she gave birth to Şehzade Mehmed Bahaeddin in 1883. She died of paralysis in November 1912, and was buried in the mausoleum of Pertevniyal Sultan.

His second wife was his maternal first cousin Cavidan Hanım. She was born on 12 January 1870 in her father's mansion in Horhor, Istanbul. Her real name was Esma Süreyya. Her father was Prince Ömer Izzet Pasha Achba, son of Prince Ahmed Bey Achba (died 1856) and Princess Eşba Hanım (died 1860), and her mother was Princess Ayşe Kemalifer Hanım Dziapş-lpa (1838 – 1901), daughter of Prince Mahmud Bey Dziapş-lpa and Princess Halime Çikotua. They married on 20 May 1885 in the Beşiktaş Palace. She was a calligrapher by avocation. After Izzeddin's death in 1916, she continued to live in his villa in Çamlıca. After the imperial family went into exile in 1924, she settled in her father's mansion in Horhor, where she died on 21 September 1933.

His third wife was Nazikeda Hanım. She was born on 30 May 1872 in Sukhumi, Abkhazia. Her real name was Aliye. She was the daughter of Halil Bey Aredba. She had two younger sisters, Rumeysa Hanım and Pakize Hanım. She was the cousin of Emine Nazikeda Kadın, consort of Sultan Mehmed VI. In 1876, she had been brought to Istanbul as a young child, where she was entrusted to the imperial harem. She was then sent to Cemile Sultan's palace in Kandilli, where her name according to the custom of the Ottoman court was changed to Nazikeda. She was then sent to the harem of Izzeddin. They married on 6 July 1886 in the Beşiktaş Palace. After Izzeddin's death in 1916, she settled in his villa in Zincirlikuyu. In 1925, she went to Egypt and stayed there with her stepdaughters, Şükriye Sultan and Mihrişah Sultan. She returned to Turkey in 1928, and settled in Kadirköy, Sivas. In 1934, in accordance to the Surname Law, she took the surname "Avcı". In late 1930s, she went to Alexandria because of inheritance issues, and returned to Turkey in the early 1940s. She died on 18 March 1945 in Kadirköy, Sivas, and was buried there.

His fourth wife was Tazende Hanım. She was born on 10 October 1875 in Poti, Abkhazia. Her real name was Faika. She was an Abkhazian or a Circassian. They married on 14 October 1892 in the Beşiktaş Palace. She was his favourite wife. After Izzeddin's death in 1916, she settled in his villa in Nişantaşı. She had adopted a girl named Seza. After the imperial family went into exile in 1924, she settled in a house on Çevirmeci Street in Ortaköy. In 1934, in accordance to the Surname Law, she took the surname "Yücesan". She died on 16 June 1950, and was buried in Yahya Efendi Cemetery.

His fifth wife was Ebruniyaz Hanım. She was an Abkhazian. After Izzeddin's death in 1916, she continued to live in his villa in Çamlıca. After the imperial family went into exile in 1924, she fell into a difficult situation. She then bought a house in Fatih, however, when her condition got worse, she went to live with Cavidan Hanım in Horhor.

His sixth wife was Leman Hanım. She was born on 6 June 1888 in Batumi, Georgia. She was a Circassian. They married on 4 February 1902 in the Çamlıca Villa. Four years later she gave birth to Hatice Şükriye Sultan in 1906, followed by Şehzade Mehmed Nizameddin in 1908, and Mihriban Mihrişah Sultan in 1916. At Izzeddin's death, when she was a few months pregnant with their third child, she resided as a guest in Dolmabahçe Palace for four months as she sought the distribution of the estate of the late prince from Sultan Mehmed V. She then settled in Beşiktaş Palace, where she give birth, and finally in Izzeddin's villa in Çamlıca. In 1934, in accordance with the Surname Law, she took the surname "Ünlüsoy". She died on 3 August 1953, and was buried in the graveyard of Selâmi Efendi.

Cavidan Hanım, Nazikeda Hanım, Tazende Hanım, and Ebruniyaz Hanım received first class Order of Charity, when Izzeddin became the crown prince.

== Suicide ==
Yusuf Izzeddin suffered from his role of heir and lived his later years in a kind of paranoia, fearful that he would be removed from the line of succession. Yusuf Izzeddin demanded that everyone, and even the Sultan Mehmed V, swear to God that he would not be removed from the position. The Sultan, due to his compassionate character, wrote a note with his very own hand assuring him that he was still the heir. But the effect of assurances in this matter was momentary; his suspicions returned after a couple of hours again, until he committed suicide on 1 February 1916 in his villa at Zincirlikuyu, Istanbul. He was buried in the mausoleum of his grandfather Sultan Mahmud II.

== Personality ==
He was described a conservative and pious person, and was also known as a proud and arrogant man. According to Halid Ziya Uşaklıgil, he had a nervous trembling that gripped his face and entire body. Izzeddin suffered from anxiety and depression, and an attendant recalled that he often refused to drink beverages out of fear of being poisoned. He was also paranoid about being sick, and his personal physicians and aides had trouble dealing with his constant paranoia and worries.

== Honours ==
Styles of Şehzade Yusuf Izzeddin
- Reference style: His Imperial Highness
- Spoken style: Your Imperial Highness

Ottoman honours

- Order of the House of Osman, Jeweled
- Order of Distinction, Jeweled
- Order of Osmanieh, Jeweled
- Order of the Medjidie, Jeweled, 18 April 1872
- Order of Glory, Jeweled, 14 September 1910
- Ottoman War Medal
- Outstanding Navy Medal in Gold
- Hicaz Demiryolu Medal in Gold
- Hilal-i Ahmer Medal in Gold
- Imtiyaz Medal in Silver
- Imtiyaz Medal in Gold

Foreign honours

- Persia: Neshan-e Aqdas, Jeweled, September 1873
- Monaco: Knight Grand Cross of the Order of Saint-Charles, 15 May 1874
- Serbia: Order of Karađorđe's Star, 9 June 1911
- United Kingdom: Honorary Knight Grand Cross of the Royal Victorian Order, 19 June 1911
- Romania: Order of Carol I, 1st Class, 27 August 1911
- Prussia: Order of the Black Eagle of Prussia, 2 September 1911

Namesakes

- Izzeddin Fortress on Crete, established in 1872 when the island was part of the Ottoman Empire, was named after Şehzade Yusuf Izzeddin.

=== Military appointments ===
- 1866: Lieutenant colonel, Ottoman Army
- 3 September 1867: Colonel, Ottoman Army
- 15 July 1868: Brigadier of the Pure Infantry Regiment in the First Imperial Army
- 30 May 1870: Brigadier of the Pure Infantry Regiment in the First and Second Imperial Army
- 3 November 1871: Chief of Staff of the First Imperial Army as Lieutenant-General
- 18 April 1872: Commander of the First Imperial Army as Lieutenant-General
- c. 1910: Field Marshal, Ottoman Army

== Issue ==
| Name | Birth | Death | Notes |
By Çeşmiahu Hanım (married 1879; died 1912)
| Şehzade Mehmed Bahaeddin | February 1883 | 8 November 1883 | died in infancy; buried in tomb of Pertevniyal Sultan |
By Leman Hanım (married 4 February 1904; 6 June 1888 – 3 August 1953)
| Hatice Şükriye Sultan | 24 February 1906 | 1 April 1972 | married thrice without issue |
| Şehzade Mehmed Nizameddin | 18 December 1908 | 19 March 1933 | died unmarried in exile in Locarno, Switzerland; buried in Cairo, and later reburied on 16 August 1967 in tomb of Sultan Mahmud II |
| Mihriban Mihrişah Sultan | 30 August 1916 | 25 January 1987 | Born after her father death, married twice without issue |

== In literature ==
- Izzeddin is a minor character in T. Byram Karasu's historical novel Of God and Madness: A Historical Novel (2007).
- Izzeddin is a character in Ayşe Osmanoğlu's historical novel The Gilded Cage on the Bosphorus (2020).

== See also ==
- Çerkez Hasan Bey, notable adjutant
- Bahaeddin Şakir Bey, notable private doctor and Young Turk

== Sources ==
- Açba, Leyla (2004). Bir Çerkes prensesinin harem hatıraları. L & M. ISBN 978-9-756-49131-7.
- Alp, Ruhat (2018). Osmanlı Devleti'nde Veliahtlık Kurumu (1908–1922) (PhD Thesis) (in Turkish). Hacettepe University Institute of Social Sciences.
- Aredba, Rumeysa; Açba, Edadil (2009). Sultan Vahdeddin'in San Remo Günleri. Timaş Yayınları. ISBN 978-9-752-63955-3.
- Brookes, Douglas Scott (2010). The Concubine, the Princess, and the Teacher: Voices from the Ottoman Harem. University of Texas Press. ISBN 978-0-292-78335-5.
- Brookes, Douglas S. (4 February 2020). On the Sultan's Service: Halid Ziya Uşaklıgil's Memoir of the Ottoman Palace, 1909–1912. Indiana University Press. ISBN 978-0-253-04553-9.
- Glencross, Matthew; Rowbotham, Judith (2018). Monarchies and the Great War. Springer. ISBN 978-3-319-89515-4.
- Tuna, Mahinur (2007). İlk Türk kadın ressam: Mihri Rasim (Müşfik) Açba : 1886 İstanbul-1954 New-York. As Yayın. ISBN 978-9-750-17250-2.
- Ünlü, Hasan (2019). Veliahd Yusuf İzzeddin Efendi (1857-1916) (Thesis). Mimar Sinan Fine Art University Institute of Social Sciences.
- Zachs, Weismann; Weismann, Itzchak (24 March 2005). Ottoman Reform and Muslim Regeneration. I.B.Tauris. ISBN 978-1-850-43757-4.
