= Gökhan Avcıoğlu =

Turkish architect (born 1960)

Celal Gökhan Avcıoğlu
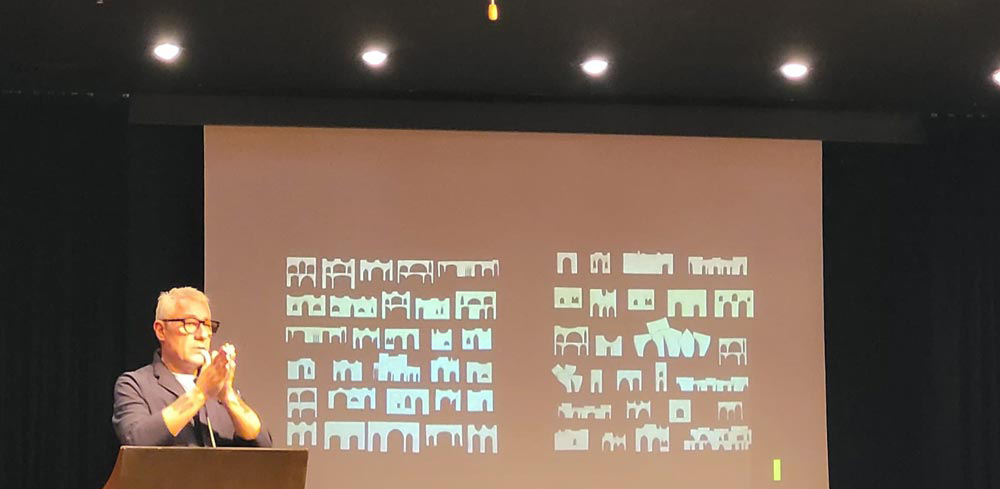
- Born: 24 December 1960 (age 65); Ankara, Turkey
- Education: Selçuk University, Konya, Turkey
- Occupation: Architect
- Years active: 1985–present
- Notable work: Trump Cadde; One & Ortaköy; Beşiktaş Fish Market; Borusan Music and Art House
- Style: Contemporary
- Website: www.gadarchitecture.com

Celal Gökhan Avcıoğlu (born 24 December 1960) is a Turkish architect. He is the principal and founder of GAD in Istanbul, established in 1994. At GAD (Global Architectural Development), Avcıoğlu has completed a number of projects of varying function and size in Turkey and regionally.

== Early life and education ==
Celal Gökhan Avcıoğlu was born in Ankara, Turkey to Selahattin Avcıoğlu, a bureaucrat and Yücel Avcıoğlu, née Erkul, a housewife. He has one sister, Serihan Avcıoğlu, who is an economist. His parents met in the Hacettepe district of Ankara while his family's roots can be traced back to Istanbul and Albania on his father's side and Istanbul, Bosnia and Thessaloniki (Selanik) in the Balkans on his mother's. His father worked as a bureaucrat for the Turkish State Railways, (Türkiye Cumhuriyeti Devlet Demiryolları), and the family often travelled throughout Turkey that included visits to archaeological sites such as the Greco-Roman city of Ephesus in the Mediterranean and Aegean coasts that became an inspiration for his interest in architecture. He went to high school in Istanbul at Boğaziçi Lisesi in Baltalimani from 1974-77 with his youth primarily spent in the Kuzguncuk district of Üsküdar on the Asian side of the city. During his time living in Kuzguncuk he was able to witness the construction of the Bosphorus Bridge in the adjacent district of Beylerbeyi that motivated his curiosity for structure and structural engineering. During his time as a high school student, his interest in art and architecture brought him to take classes in sculpture at Istanbul's Fine Arts Academy - İstanbul Devlet Güzel Sanatlar Akademesi now known as Mimar Sinan Fine Arts University. In construction he was influenced by the work of the many "Design Build" architects working as building contractors in Turkey in the 1970s including spending time as an intern on the construction sites of his uncle, the architect and construction contractor Tandoğan Erkul. Throughout his career Avcıoğlu in addition to his architectural practice would have key relationships with Turkey's contractors and builders seeking to advance economic and operational models for construction.

He was accepted to the İstanbul Devlet Güzel Sanatlar Akademisi in 1977 and after briefly attending architecture school in Edirne, Turkey, he would instead go on to start and complete his education in architecture at Selçuk University in Konya at a distance from Istanbul. Part of the reason for his decision to pursue architectural education in Konya was that it was a relatively calmer setting in a tumultuous time in Turkish history that included the urban conflicts of the Political violence in Turkey (1976–1980) and the succeeding 1980 Turkish coup d'état. He eventually graduated with a professional degree in architecture in 1983 during an extended 7 year tenure. Towards the end of his architectural education he worked as an intern with Turkish modernist architect Cengiz Bektaş from 1981 to 1983 who was also based in Kuzguncuk, Istanbul, and later started a practice Mimarlik Hizmetleri Ltd from 1990-1994 with the architect Nevzat Sayın whom he had met during his time at the office of Bektaş. He was active in the milieu of architects and archaeologists in Bektaş's circle which prompted him to explore Central Anatolia in detail including Cappadoccia. Later he would go further east, intrepidly hitchhiking on his own through Turkey to the Iranian regions of Khorasan and Isfahan on the Silk Road ending up in Samerkand in Uzbekistan. The end of his student days was marked by his internship on the restoration project of the Uzbek Sufi Lodge in Üsküdar, Istanbul, where he worked closely with the traditional carpenter craftsman, Eyup usta, on the complete reconstruction of the historical timber Ottoman building financed in part by the Turkish-American businessman, Ahmet Ertegün. This experience with traditional building would also be a trajectory he would pursue in his professional practice.

== Career ==
Avcıoğlu is the founder and has been the principal of Global Architectural Development (GAD) since 1994. He taught at the École Spéciale d'Architecture in Paris. His projects include residences, office and hotel buildings, cultural, public and commercial spaces in Istanbul, Bodrum, New Jersey, New York City, Washington, D.C., Virginia, Connecticut, Libya, Beirut, Riyadh, and Kyiv.

He has offices in Istanbul, New York City, Bodrum and Dubai. Avcıoğlu is a member American Institute of Architects (AIA) New York Chapter, Royal Institute of British Architects (RIBA) and the Chamber of Architects Turkey (TMMOB).

== Selected projects ==
=== Built projects ===
- Gazhane Istanbul (1995)
- Kadıköy Public Park Facilities Istanbul (1997)
- Esma Sultan (2000)
- Borusan Parkorman Expedition Center Istanbul (2001)
- KUUM Hotel and Residences (2009)
- Exploded House (2003)
- Castle Rock Bodrum (2007)
- Beşiktaş Fish Market (2009)
- Borusan Music and Art House (2009)
- One & Ortaköy (2011)
- SUSONA Bodrum (2011)
- DIVAN Kurucesme (2012)
- TASIGO Eskişehir Spa and Thermal Hotel (2013)
- Serra Gate (2013)
- NewADA Istanbul (2014)
- Mandarin Oriental Hotel and Residences (2014)
- Trump Cadde (2014)
- Swissotel Resort Bodrum Beach (2015)
- AHK Kndu Villas (2016)
- YKAD House Ankara (2016)
- Four Seasons Sales office Bodrum (2019)
- Book Less or More (2022)Book Less or More

=== Kadıköy Public Park Facilities Istanbul (1997) ===
The project is located in Kadıköy, Istanbul with its unobtrusive structure sitting in the middle of a natural park surrounded by a bustling, almost chaotic metropolitan atmosphere. The project demonstrates a high level of consideration for both people and the environment. The building's design is based on early Ottoman hammams (public bathhouses), which were often designed as cubic or rectangular masses with a primary dome over the central space. The architect decided to invert the old dome and place it above the cubic structure popping out of the ground. The intention was to make landscaping a key component of the project. The roof, which was the most noticeable piece protruding above ground, was treated as a landscaping feature or a huge planter to fit a bamboo garden. The graphic imposition of the proposal on the existing landscape is provocative, but with good reason. The relandscaping of this modest but essential urban park and public facilities have a lot of potential. The decision to bury the building, on the other hand, has helped the site by allowing green plants to continue above it.

=== Esma Sultan (2002) ===
In Istanbul Ortakoy district, Esma Sultan Mansion is a multi-purpose event and exhibition hall located right on the Bosporus Strait. The project uses the concept of transparency to showcase the historic brick shell while creating a contemporary interior space for events, which was built inside the ruins of a 19th century Bosphorus Ottoman yali that was devastated by fire. The design concept centers on placing a glass box behind the remaining façade walls, preserving the building's heritage while adapting it to the needs of Istanbul's modern city.

The box, composed of glass walls and stainless steel with reinforced concrete columns, was designed to operate as a vibrant remnant, a functional record of bygone ages with old brick walls, as part of the "building inside a building" construction approach. This first proposal was based on a technical constructive aesthetic, which was accomplished with little adjustments in the finished structure. The bare brick walls face the Bosporus on the outside, a palimpsest on a shoreline previously dotted with these yalıs. The design addresses the issue of maintaining continuity with Istanbul's ancient urban fabric, particularly along the Bosporus, which has a rigorous building code that restricts new development to the rehabilitation of buildings that predate the mid-twentieth century.

=== KUUM Hotel and Residences (2009) ===
The KUUM Hotel Spa & Residences is a boutique resort hotel located in Bodrum, Turkey. Bodrum's natural context and historical Mediterranean legacy heavily inspired the boutique resort's design, which won recognition in 2011 with the International Hotel Awards' "Best Hotel Architecture" award, and in 2012 with the World Luxury Spa Awards' "Best Luxury Destination Spa" designation.

The resort's diverse building typologies are organized to satisfy varied programming purposes, resulting in heterogeneous zones. The zones are divided into public and private zones. Another technique to add variety is to use the senses, especially the visual, tactile, and olfactory ones. Material diversity provides visual and tactile richness, as well as a sense of wholeness via difference.

=== Exploded House (2009) ===
The Exploded House design illustrates classic Aegean vernacular homes with newer techniques and formal advances while maintaining the same attention to interior climate mediation. The project approach is to use passive ventilation based on wide overhangs, natural air circulation, and rainwater as an organic cooling system, whereas vernacular dwellings in Bodrum, use thick natural stone walls to buffer temperatures in the hot Aegean region. The House's angular structure protects it from the sun and serves as a formal synthesis with the asymmetric topography that fits into the rocky clefts of the hillside. The main house's open layout coins that it is light and airy, which is essential in the summer. As an additional precaution, the building's roof is filled with ponds that collect rainwater and act as a heat sump. Water flows from one building's roof to the next, then circulates back around, producing a natural cooling system for the summer months of April to October. This climactic performance is achieved while the architecture is being created in accordance with building code constraints of 75 square meters in a layout where each unit is erected close to one another with a small space connecting them with a glass atrium.

=== Beşiktaş Fish Market (2009) ===
Beşiktaş Fish Market project, which received the 2014 Archmarathon Crowd Award and the 2012 International Architecture Award by Chicago Athenaeum, offers open space for public use that maximizes air flow and light through the structure. Due to its wide entrances on all sides, light, air, and crowds can all move easily throughout the space. There are no internal columns to inhibit air or crowd flow, which is enabled by the steel and concrete structure. Being located in one of Istanbul’s most populated and diverse neighborhoods, Beşiktaş Fish Market Project's main ideology regarding its formal and conceptual organization is to achieve a lively, welcoming appearance, so the surface was permeated along its periphery resulting in a dynamic, overwhelming form in concrete that generates programmatic and circulation elements to easily mix and flow.

The design is a modern and functional solution for this surrounding urban location's Fish Market, and it has become an upgrade to their market and area. The design that met the programmatic needs of the Fish Market as a retail outlet, but realized a modern public space with an innovative approach to form and materials in the traditional fabric of the city, working collaboratively with the primary stakeholders, the municipality, and fishmongers.

=== Borusan Music and Art House (2009) ===
Locating at Istanbul's art and culture center İstiklal Avenue, Borusan Music and Art House hosts music and performance events, the visual arts, annual exhibitions, and other curatorial exhibitions. The project transformed the historic building into a multipurpose cultural center. While the modern box at its core includes a lightweight steel diagrid enabling open and flexible floor plans to facilitate events, the historic core has been restored. The building’s new functions are visible solely at street level vanishing behind the neo-classic façade on the upper floors in an ideology of the limited role modern architecture can offer in this historical urban fabric dominated by Istanbul's 19th century past. Many artworks are attached to the building with LEDs illuminating the V columns. The project targets at symbolizing Istanbul's colorful and artistic renaissance in a dualistic tension between past and present by preserving the city's heritage.

=== One & Ortaköy (2011) ===
One & Ortaköy is a mixed-use project composed of two buildings and a courtyard adjacent to the Bosporus hillside and the urban surroundings. The courtyard connects the main residential building, which has four connected cylindrical volumes, and to the amorphously shaped smaller student dormitories. Buildings' roofs are designed to be leisure areas as playgrounds. The formation and typology of green roofs create a morphological connection with the existing topography. Another key ecological feature is the rainwater collection system on roofs, which is used to irrigate the gardens and dense plantation areas. The two buildings' façades were totally covered in Ünye stone, a form of yellow-beige limestone from Turkey's northern Anatolia region with a 3-million-year history. This stone, which comes in a variety of colors, is known for its thermal insulation characteristics in construction keeping interior spaces cool in the summer and warm in the winter. Therefore, the major motivation for using Ünye stone in the project is that it covers the various shapes of the building's exterior and that its surface reflects sunlight differently during each of the four seasons of the year, allowing occupants to feel the changing of seasons.

=== SUSONA Bodrum (2011) ===
The project lies on a private peninsula surrounded by turquoise water and forest in Torba, Bodrum which is a little seaside village with olive gardens and pine forests around it. The facilities were developed by Gokhan Avcioglu & GAD to reflect the Mediterranean lifestyle. The need for seclusion and the pleasure of being in the area are properly balanced. The concept of water drops with a strong energy center and concentric rings radiating outwards inspired the design. The resort's size and scope are in keeping with Bodrum's historical existence. The buildings have a maximum of two floors and are painted in the distinctive white color of the area. The resort's sleek and contemporary architecture forms are a key feature, signaling the resort's high level of luxury. Timber screens are also used to provide climatic relief as well as a distinctive visual component. A number of layers of buildings structured on tiers cascade down to the water's edge. Lush gardens with a variety of plants and trees may be seen in between the terraces. The programmatic requirements result in the formation of a cell-like structure with a nucleus at its core. The characteristics of the Forum and Agora are also reflected in the design, which combines multiple programs to create a network of public and private spaces.

=== DIVAN Kurucesme (2012) ===
Divan Kurucesme is located on one of the Bosporus' magnificent coasts and has a great cityscape. The project is critical since it must be in keeping with the city's silhouette, surrenders, and nature. Therefore, restoration efforts concentrated on maintaining the wall and trees that had already been there. With all of these new volumes, the project has also a multipurpose venue, meeting rooms, and topography incorporated into four hotel rooms. Parking and servicing areas are included in the project. Some features of the existing building, such as stone walls and vaults, have been maintained to preserve the social and constructed character. It is aimed that walls and vaults transform into living design structures.

The building's roof is supposed to be a fluxion of green surrenders. Simultaneously, the roof captures sunlight through controlled roof windows. Building elements' interior materials are made of sustainable and local materials; for the internal surface of the roof, rough wood panels were used, and natural stone was used for the floors.

With the brick walls, arches, and vaults above, the semi-transparent steel and glass canopy accentuates the historical fabric of the Bosporus in an architectural strategy that also provides a dynamic, modern architecture in a spatial sense. This spatial dynamism and historic architectural continuity in materials and forms do not always imply a restoration paradigm for updating the traditional building. Instead, the exposed ruins of prior building foundations and terraces have been combined to provide unique spatial linkages and views up and down the site, within the ancient remains, and, most crucially, from the Bosporus itself.

=== TASİGO Eskişehir Spa and Thermal Hotel (2013) ===
Various awards holders such as 2012 Highly Recommended Hotel Architecture, International Hotel and Property Awards, 2013 Green GOOD DESIGN Award for Eskisehir Spa & Thermal Hotel project, 2015 WAF shortlisted, 2016 Pool Vision Middle East in the category Tourism and Leisure, the project re-evaluates the city’s quite rich history and former civilizations existed on this land such as Hittites, Phrygia, Alexandria, Rome, Byzantium, Anatolia Seljuk Empire, and Ottoman Empire, and particularly Odunpazarı region that has great tourism assets with its historic texture. The idea was heavily influenced and inspired by the hot spring resources of Eskişehir. For years, the people believed that the hot water had a therapeutic effect and that anyone who sat in it for a time would improve their health; this led to a rise in the amount of attention that local and foreign visitors gave to the region. Because of the increasing growth in tourism potential, there is a demand for superior accommodations for both Turkish and foreign visitors. The project is a contemporary interpretation of the vernacular architecture and historical texture of Odunpazarı. In a hillside pine forest, there is also a hotel, a wedding venue, and guest cottages. Because of its proximity to the geothermal water source, the project site is ideal for a thermal spa. To take advantage of the land's geothermal qualities, the spa, and wellness facility are buried in the ground. The project incorporates sustainable design elements by utilizing wind and solar energy. Geothermal energy is not only employed in spas but also for space heating during the winter months, thanks to a geothermal heat pump system. “Reduce, Reuse, Recycle” is a fundamental waste mitigation approach that the property adopts. Cardboard, plastic bottles, glass bottles, steel and aluminum cans, office paper, newspaper, fluorescent light bulbs, cooking oil, toner cartridges, batteries, pallets, and crates are all gathered around the facility.

=== Serra Gate (2013) ===
For a long time, architects have been focusing on developing new forms through the development of new fabrication techniques. Thanks to 3D printers, many designers can experiment with the designs that these new technologies might bring into the architectural world. Not only did it expand the production capabilities, making the process faster with more outputs, but it also provide support of digital design methods, allowing them to be realized in physical form and challenge the argument that digitization of design will necessarily lead to paper architecture.

Serra Gate sculptural design has been placed in various locations including Taksim Square in Istanbul, just in time for Istanbul Design Week. GAD Principal, Gokhan Avcioglu, once mentioned that: “We are delighted that Serra Gate has been featured in Taksim one of the most important squares of Istanbul. Being a ground-breaking structure, Serra Gate will make the residents of Istanbul question how public spaces have been defined by urban interventions.” The Serra Gate's steel form was manufactured using cutting-edge technology and is named after the minimalist sculptor Richard Serra whose work inspired the design. The sinuous curve was created using the software Mathematica and modeled using the latest up-to-date 3D printing techniques.

=== Un-built projects ===
- GDKP Istanbul (2010)
- Mudanya House Bursa (2012)
- Topkapı Cultural Center Istanbul (2013)
- Kıyı Hotel Branded Villas Residences Bodrum (2015)
- Varvarka Moscow (2016)
- Pınar Academy Logistic Istanbul (2017)
- Tashkent City (2017)
- Rvky (2017)
- Media City Istanbul (2017)
- Folkart Residence Halkapınar İzmir (2018)
- ITU Library Istanbul (2018)
- Science Center Ljubljana (2019)
- Cappadocia Spa Hotel (2020)
- Cappadocia KEPEZ (2020)
- Montenegro (2020)
- Next Generation School / Arnavutkoy (2020)

=== Experimental projects ===
- Andalus Villa Libia (2007)
- Osmos Tower Kazan (2009)
- Topkapı Park (2014)
- Maslak (2015)
- Mixed Use Project Istanbul (2015)
- GADHouse Los Angeles (2017)
- ITU Library Istanbul (2018)
- CIP Lounge Istanbul (2018)
- İst Marina / Istanbul (2018)
- China Town New York City (2018)
- Park Avenue New York City (2018)
- Hyde Park Library London (2020)
- TIRANA Municipality Building (2020)
- Balmumcu (2021)
- Cysus (2021)
- BDPT Hungary (2021)
