= Mihrişah Sultan (daughter of Şehzade Izzeddin) =

Ottoman princess

- Born: 30 August 1916; Beşiktaş Palace, Constantinople, Ottoman Empire (now Istanbul, Turkey)
- Died: 25 January 1987 (aged 70); Istanbul, Turkey
- Burial: Sultan Mahmud II Mausoleum, Divanyolu, Istanbul
- Spouse: Şehzade Ömer Faruk (m. 1948; div. 1959): Şevket Arslanoğlu
Names
- Turkish: Mihriban Mihrişah Sultan; Ottoman Turkish: مهربان مهرشاہ سلطان
- Dynasty: Ottoman
- Father: Şehzade Yusuf Izzeddin
- Mother: Leman Hanım
- Religion: Sunni Islam

Mihriban Mihrişah Sultan (Ottoman Turkish: مھربان مھرشاہ سلطان; 30 August 1916 – 25 January 1987) was an Ottoman princess, the daughter of heir to the throne Şehzade Yusuf Izzeddin, son of Sultan Abdulaziz, and Leman Hanım. She was the second wife of Şehzade Ömer Faruk, son of the last Ottoman caliph, Abdülmecid II and Şehsuvar Hanım.

== Early life ==
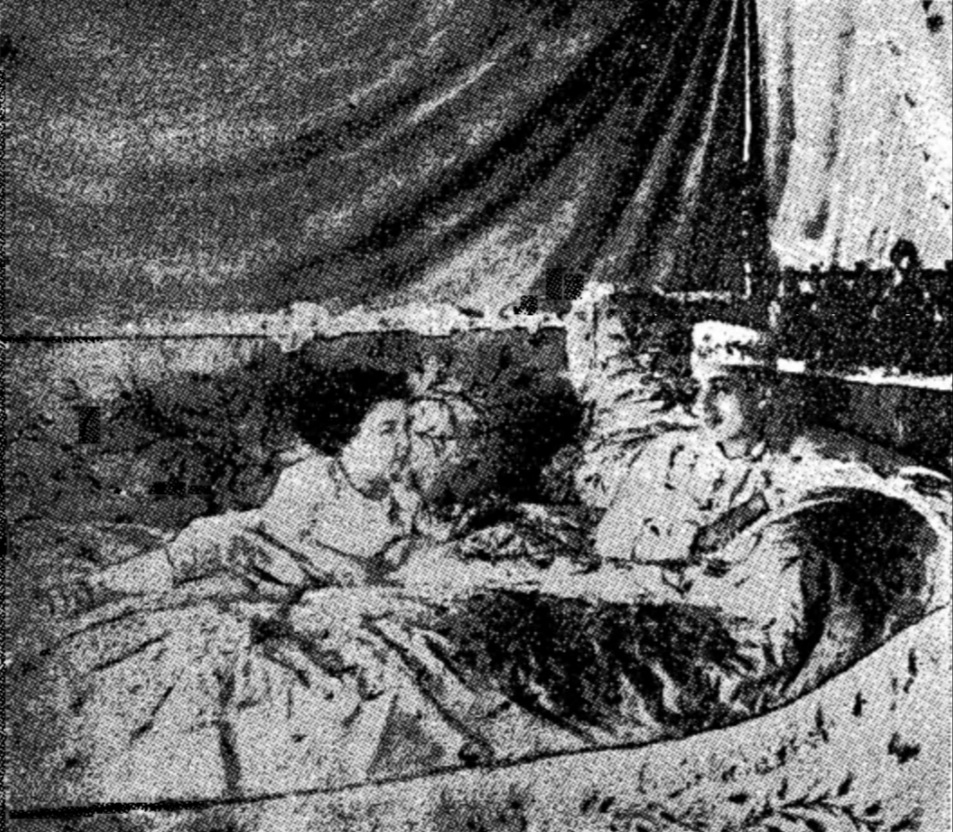
Mihrişah Sultan (left) and her brother Şehzade Mehmed Nizameddin

Mihrişah Sultan was born on 30 August 1916 in Beşiktaş Palace. Her father was crown prince Şehzade Yusuf Izzeddin, son of Abdulaziz and Dürrünev Kadın, and her mother was Leman Hanım, his six consort. She was the fourth child, and second daughter born to her father and the third child of her mother. She had two elder siblings, a sister, Şükriye Sultan, ten years older than her and a brother, Şehzade Mehmed Nizameddin, seven years older than her. Her father committed suicide seven months before her birth.

Upon the exile of the imperial family in March 1924, Mihrişah moved to Romania with her brother Nizameddin, but when he began to have problems with alcoholism and fell ill with tuberculosis, she accepted the invitation of his sister Şükriye to move to her in Egypt. The sisters lived in Cairo and Alexandria. Their mother Leman Hanim remained with Nizameddin to take care of him. In 1934, her marriage was arranged to Şehzade Mehmed Abid, the youngest son of Sultan Abdul Hamid II and Saliha Naciye Hanım, however, the marriage never materialised.

== First marriage ==
Şehzade Ömer Faruk had an increased interest in his cousin Mihrişah. It was also public knowledge that things were not going well between Faruk and his wife Princess Sabiha Sultan, the daughter of Sultan Mehmed VI.

In 1944, Mihrişah even sided with Faruk when the council chose Prince Ahmed Nihad as the head of the family. While Sabiha backed the council's decision and approved the choice of the leader. His daughters also sided with their mother. Faruk accused Sabiha of turning their daughters against him. But he was already in love with Mihrişah and the issue of the council was just an excuse.

Faruk divorced Sabiha on 5 March 1948, after twenty-eight years of marriage, and just four months later married Mihrişah in a religious ceremony on 31 July 1948. In the prenuptial agreement she asked that the right to divorce her husband be included in the contract. She owned a small apartment building No. 8 Road 11 off Menashe Avenue in Cairo.

The marriage to Mihrişah damaged the relationship between Farouk and his daughters, especially that with Neslişah Sultan, already compromised by the fact that Faruk, years earlier, had forced her to marry. Neslişah accepted to see her father, but not the stepmother. Mihrişah, however, took good care of Faruk. Realizing how she was sacrificing herself for his sake, Neslişah decided to see her again. It was Faruk's habit to come to Neslişah's house for lunch on Mondays, and from then on he began to bring Mihrişah with him.

However, their marriage did not last and a few years later, Mihrişah divorced Faruk in 1959 using her right to divorce her husband. Later Faruk would tell his friends, "I divorced the most beautiful woman in the world to marry the ugliest one. Fate!"

== Second marriage ==
After Mihrişah divorced Ömer Faruk, she married Şevket Arslanoğlu. It is not known if they divorced or if he died, but when Mihrişah returned to Turkey she was alone. Mihrişah returned to Istanbul after the revocation of the law of exile for princesses. She spent her last years with her cousin Gevheri Sultan, daughter of her uncle Şehzade Mehmed Seyfeddin, in a spacious apartment in Taksim Square.

== Death ==
Mihrişah Sultan died on 25 January 1987 at the age of seventy, and was buried in the mausoleum of her great-grandfather Sultan Mahmud II, Divanyolu, Istanbul.

== Sources ==
- Bardakçı, Murat (2017). Neslishah: The Last Ottoman Princess. Oxford University Press. ISBN 978-9-774-16837-6.
