= Şükriye Sultan =

Ottoman princess, daughter of Şehzade Yusuf Izzeddin

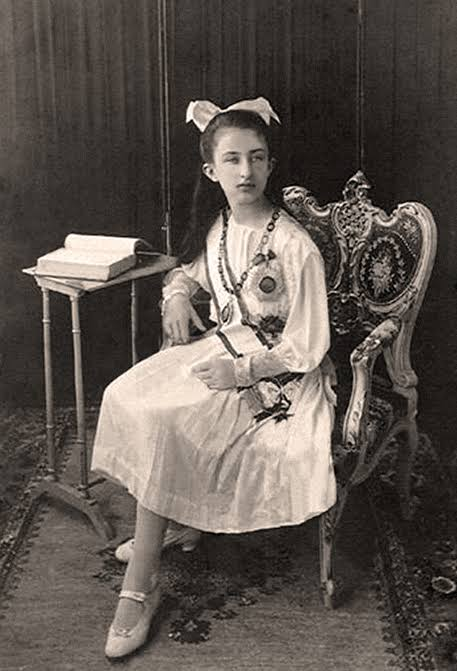
- Born: 24 February 1906; Çamlıca Villa, Constantinople, Ottoman Empire
- Died: 1 April 1972 (aged 66); Çamlıca Villa, Istanbul, Turkey
- Burial: Sultan Mahmud II Mausoleum, Divanyolu, Istanbul
- Spouse: Şehzade Mehmed Şerafeddin (m. 1923; div. 1927) Ahmad Al-Jaber Al-Sabah (m. 1935; div. 1937) Mehmed Şefik Ziya (m. 1949–1972)
Names
- Turkish: Hatice Şükriye Sultan; Ottoman Turkish: خدیجه شکریه سلطان
- Dynasty: Ottoman
- Father: Şehzade Yusuf Izzeddin
- Mother: Leman Hanım
- Religion: Sunni Islam

Hatice Şükriye Sultan (Ottoman Turkish: خدیجه شکریه سلطان; 24 February 1906 – 1 April 1972) was an Ottoman princess, the daughter of heir to the throne Şehzade Yusuf Izzeddin, son of Sultan Abdulaziz.

== Early life ==
Şükriye Sultan was born on 24 February 1906 in the villa of her father, Şehzade Yusuf Izzeddin, in Çamlıca. Her mother was Leman Hanım. She was the second child, and eldest daughter born to her father and the eldest child of her mother. She had two younger siblings, a brother, Şehzade Mehmed Nizameddin, two years younger than her, and a sister, Mihriban Mihrişah Sultan, ten years younger than her. Her father committed suicide on 1 February 1916, when she was ten years old. She was the granddaughter of Abdulaziz and Dürrünev Kadın.

== First marriage ==
Şükriye Sultan married her second cousin Şehzade Mehmed Şerafeddin, son of Şehzade Selim Süleyman, and grandson of Sultan Abdulmejid I. The wedding took place on 14 November 1923 in the Nişantaşı Villa. At the exile of the imperial family in March 1924, Şükriye, and her husband moved to Paris, where they lived until 1925, and then to Egypt, where she was joined by her sister Mihrişah Sultan and Cavidan Hanım, her father's second consort. Later the couple moved to Beirut, where the two divorced in 1927.

== Second marriage ==
On 4 September 1935, she married Ahmad Al-Jaber Al-Sabah at Cairo, Egypt. They divorced in 1937.

On 10 February 1938, she was engaged to Midhat Bey, son of Ziver Pasha. However, the marriage, didn't take place. In 1944, she sided with Şehzade Ömer Faruk when the council chose Şehzade Ahmed Nihad as the head of the family.

== Third marriage ==
In April 1949, she married Mehmed Şefik Ziya (1894 – 1980), an American citizen of Turkish Cypriot ethnicity. In 1952, she, her husband, and her sister returned to Istanbul after the revocation of the law of exile for princesses. Here she settled in Çamlıca Villa.

== Death ==
Şükriye Sultan died on 1 April 1972 at the age of sixty-six and was buried in the mausoleum of her great grandfather Sultan Mahmud II, in Divanyolu, Istanbul. Mehmed Şefik later married Neslişah Sultan, daughter of Şehzade Mehmed Abdülkadir.

== Honours ==
- Order of the House of Osman
- Order of Charity, 1st Class
- Order of Distinction
