= Esma Sultan Mansion =

Ottoman Mansion

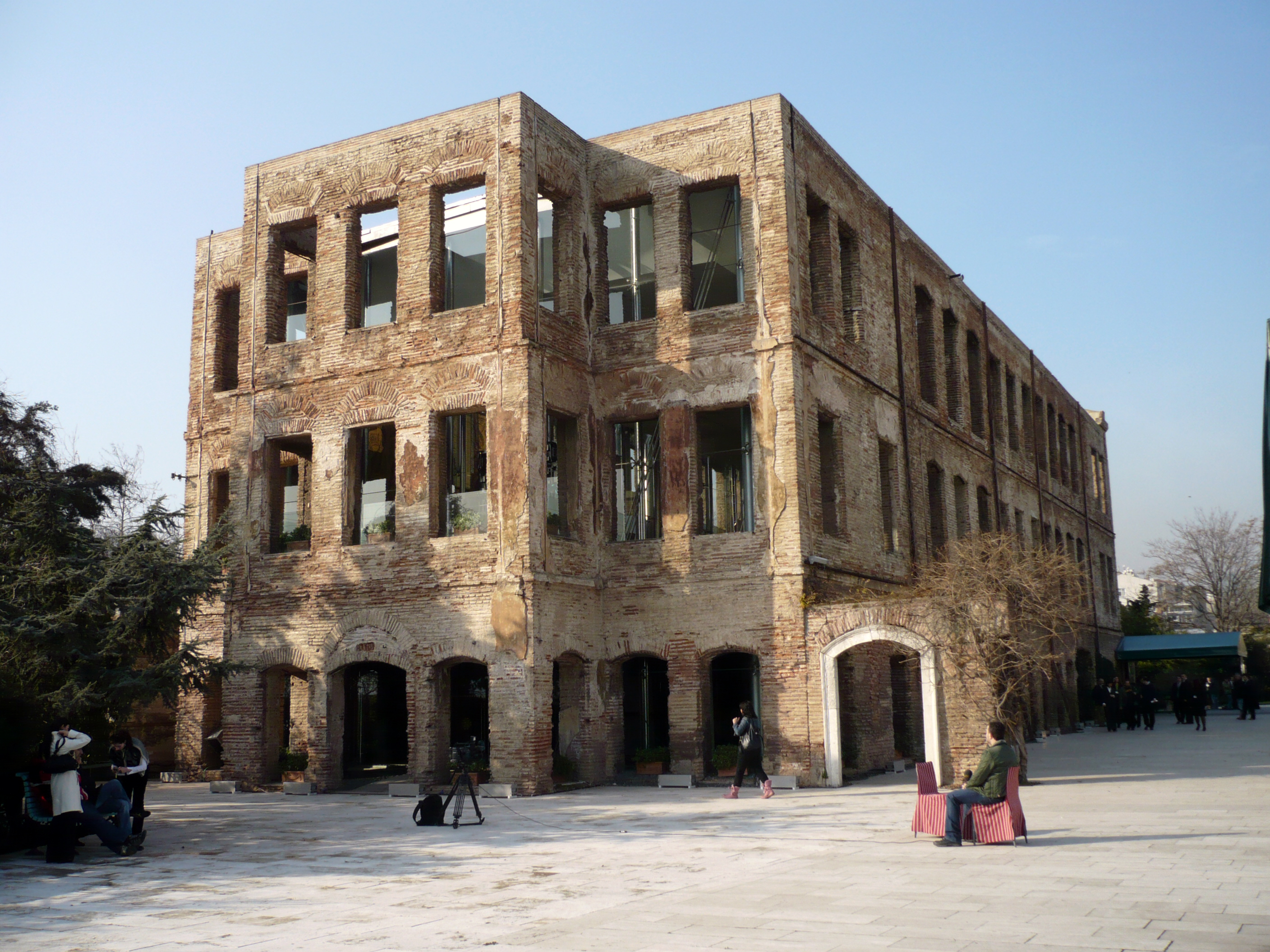

- Location within Istanbul

General information
- Type: Brick; Redevelopment: Brick, steel and glass
- Location: Ortaköy, Istanbul, Turkey
- Coordinates: 41.047481°N 29.02745°E
- Construction started: 1875
- Renovated: Redevelopment: 2001
- Governing body: The Marmara Collection

Dimensions
- Other dimensions: 31.5 m × 27 m (103 ft × 89 ft)

Technical details
- Floor count: 3

Design and construction
- Architects: Sarkis Balyan; Redevelopment: Gökhan Avcıoğlu

The Esma Sultan Mansion (Turkish: Esma Sultan Yalısı), a historical yalı located on the Bosphorus in the Ortaköy neighborhood of Istanbul, Turkey and named after its original owner Princess Esma Sultan, is used today as a cultural center after being redeveloped.

== History ==
The three-storey brick manor was designed by the renowned architect Sarkis Balyan and finished in 1875 next to Ortaköy Mosque. It was presented to the Princess Esma Sultan, the daughter of Ottoman Sultan Abdulaziz, as a wedding gift in 1889.

The mansion remained in the possession of the Ottoman dynasty until 1915. Subsequently, the building was used first as a tobacco warehouse and then as a coal depot from 1920 until 1975 when it was destroyed by a fire.

== Redevelopment ==
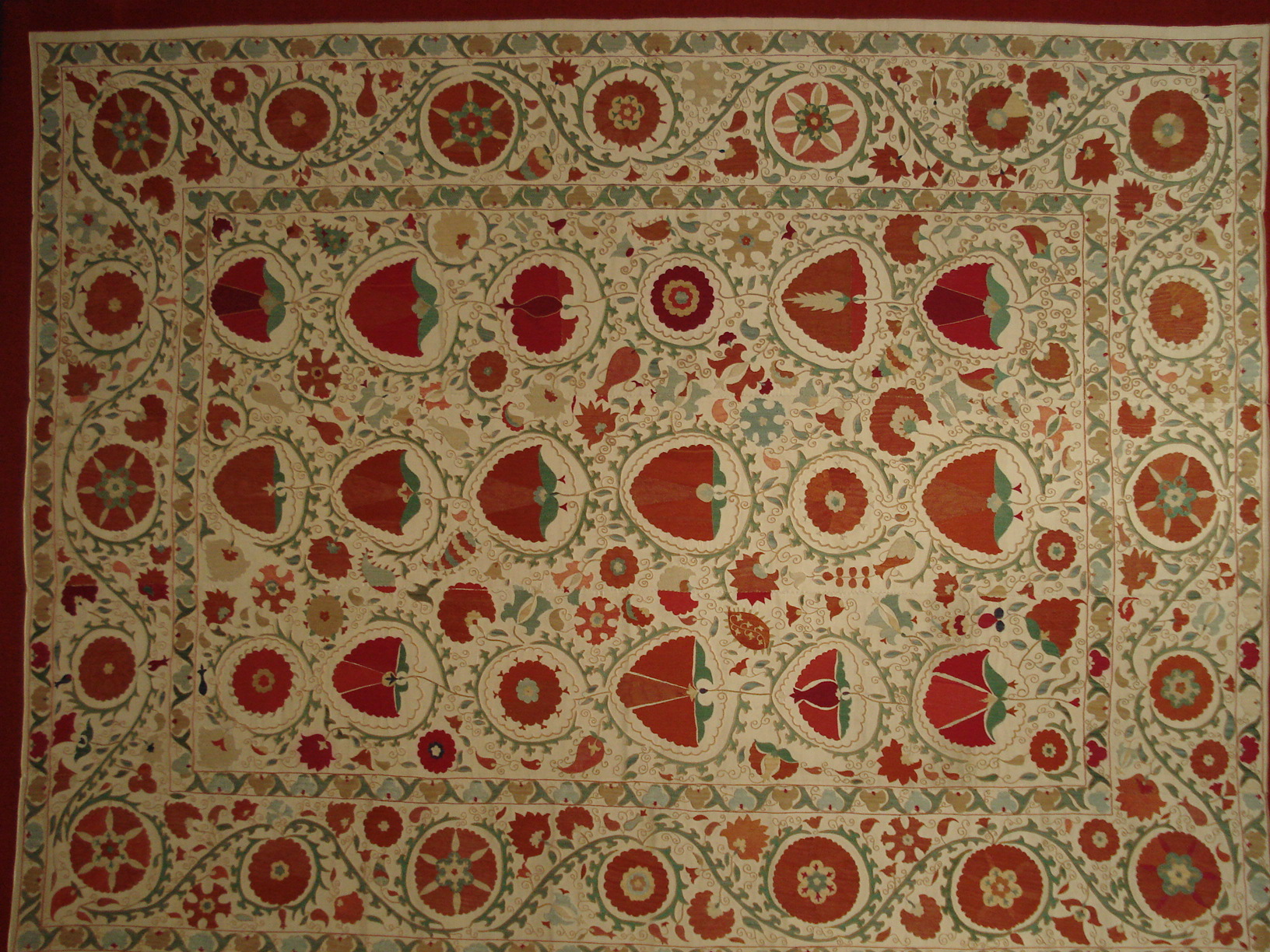
A wall rug as interior decoration

The ruin, consisting only of the outer walls of the building, was purchased in the early 1990s by The Marmara Collection. Following a renovation with additions designed by architects Haluk Sezgin and Philippe Robert, the mansion was opened in 2001 as a multipurpose event venue. Within the brick exterior, which was left as the original, a steel and glass structure is incorporated. According to the GAD Architecture Group, a redesign by the architect Gökhan Avcıoğlu was completed in 2005. The building includes a bar, a restaurant, and an event hall at several levels. The building is situated in a garden of 2,226 m^{2} (23,960 ft^{2}). The ground floor is 31.5 m (103 ft) wide, 27 m (89 ft) long and 3.80 m (12.5 ft) high. The first floor is merged with the second floor, having dimensions of 31.5 m (103 ft) wide, 31 m (102 ft) long and 6.80 m (22.3 ft) high.

Esma Sultana Mansion, run by The Marmara Hotel chain as a venue for various meetings and conferences, offers banqueting space in a historical atmosphere for up to 1,000 guests in the garden, 180 guests in the ground floor and 330 guests in the first floor. Space for reception is available for up to 3,000 guests in the garden, 300 guests in the ground floor and 600 guests in the first floor. The venue also hosts concerts of the Istanbul International Jazz Festival and the Istanbul International Music Festival.

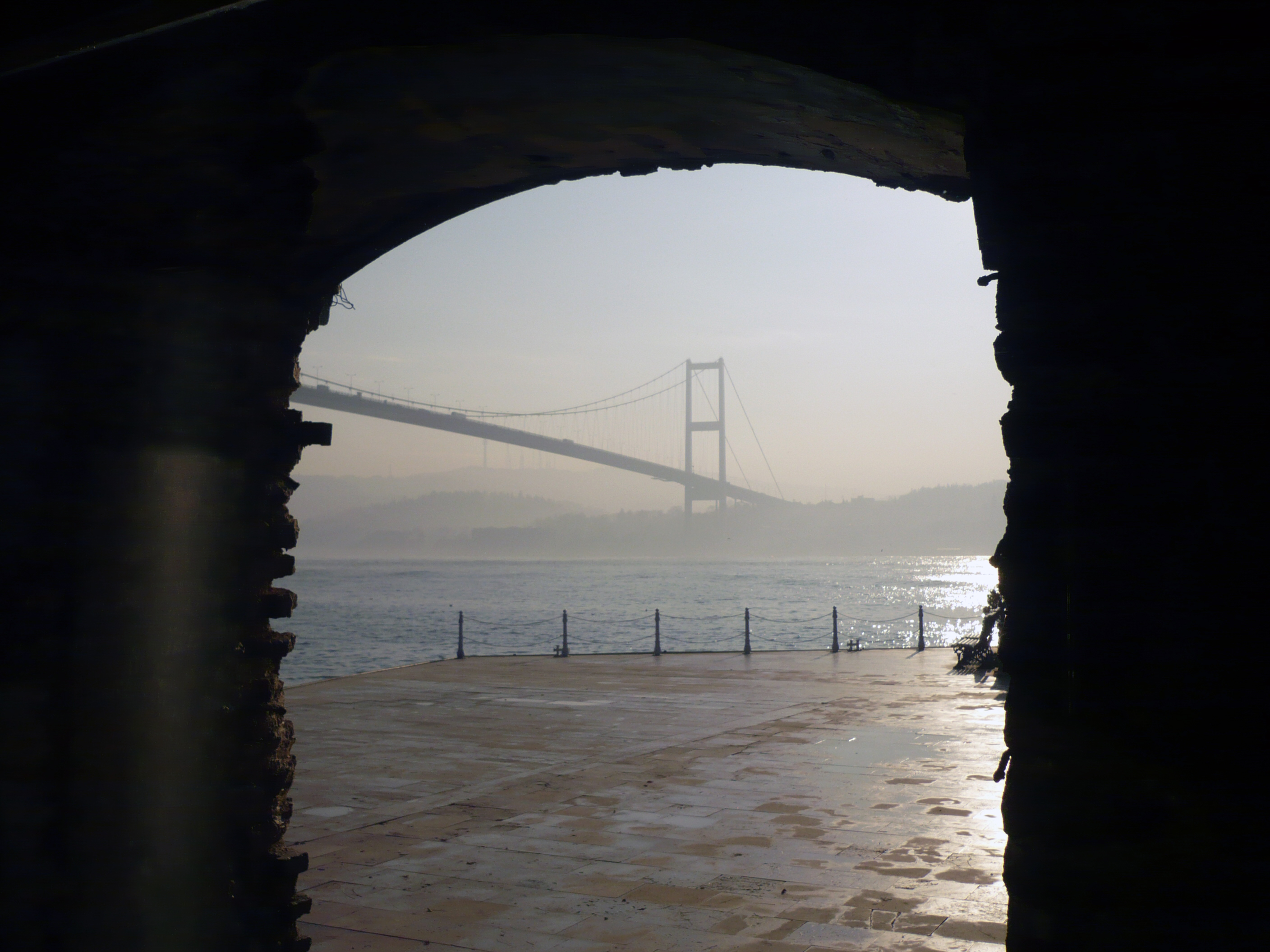
Bosphorus Bridge seen from the inside of the mansion
