= Esma Sultan (daughter of Abdulaziz) =

Ottoman princess, daughter of Sultan Abdülaziz (1873–1899)

- Born: 21 March 1873; Dolmabahçe Palace, Constantinople, Ottoman Empire
- Died: 7 May 1899 (aged 26); Constantinople, Ottoman Empire
- Burial: New Mosque, Istanbul
- Spouse: Kabasakal Çerkes Mehmed Pasha (m. 1889)
- Issue: Sultanzade Hasan Bedreddin Bey; Sultanzade Hüseyn Hayreddin Bey; Mihriban Hanımsultan; Sultanzade Mehmed Saadeddin Bey; Sultanzade Abdüllah Bey
- Dynasty: Ottoman
- Father: Abdulaziz
- Mother: Gevheri Kadın
- Religion: Sunni Islam

Esma Sultan (Ottoman Turkish: اسما سلطان; 21 March 1873 – 7 May 1899) was an Ottoman princess, the daughter of Sultan Abdulaziz and Gevheri Kadın.

== Early life ==
Esma Sultan was born on 21 March 1873 in the Dolmabahçe Palace. Her father was Abdulaziz, son of Mahmud II and Pertevniyal Sultan. Her mother was Gevheri Kadın. She was the eldest child of her mother and the elder full sister of Şehzade Mehmed Seyfeddin.

Her father Abdulaziz was deposed by his ministers on 30 May 1876, and his nephew Murad V became the Sultan. He was transferred to the Feriye Palace the next day. Abdulaziz's entourage didn't want to leave the Dolmabahçe Palace, so they were grabbed by the hand and were sent out to the Feriye Palace. In the process, they were searched from head to toe and everything of value was taken from them. On 4 June 1876, Abdulaziz died under mysterious circumstances.

Esma, who was three years old at that time, grew up under the supervision of her elder half-brother, the Crown Prince Şehzade Yusuf Izzeddin. She had slanting eyebrows, big black eyes, a long face, white skin, and short hair, and was tall. She began her education at the Ihlamur Pavilion, in 1879, along with her brothers, Şehzade Mehmed Seyfeddin and Şehzade Mehmed Şevket, and Sultan Abdul Hamid II's children, Şehzade Mehmed Selim and Zekiye Sultan.

== Marriage ==
In 1889 Sultan Abdul Hamid II arranged her trousseaux and marriage together with her two sisters, Princesses Saliha Sultan and Nazime Sultan, as well as his own daughter, Princess Zekiye Sultan.

On 20 April 1889 at the age of sixteen, she married Damat Kabasakal Çerkes Mehmed Pasha in the Yıldız Palace. He was the widower of Sultan Abdulmejid I's daughter Naile Sultan and he was twenty years older than her. To marry Esma he divorced his second wife, a foreign woman, whom he was married to after Naile's death. She moved into her palace known as "Esma Sultan Mansion", in which Mehmed Pasha and Naile Sultan previously lived.

In 1890, a year after the marriage, she gave birth to her first child, Sultanzade Hasan Bedreddin Bey (died 1909) in 1892 to her second child, Sultanzade Hüseyin Hayreddin Bey (died 1987), in 1894 to her third child, Mihriban Hanımsultan, who died in infancy, on 14 June 1895 to her fourth child, Sultanzade Saadeddin Mehmed Bey (died 1976), and in 1899 her fifth and last child, Sultanzade Abdüllah (stillbirth).

== Death ==
Esma Sultan died in childbirth on 7 May 1899 at the age of twenty-six and was buried in the mausoleum of imperial ladies at the New Mosque, Eminönü, Istanbul. After her death, Sultan Abdul Hamid II decided to get Hatice Sultan, daughter of Sultan Murad V married to her widower, Mehmed Pasha. However, the marriage never took place.

== Issue ==
Name	Birth	Death	Notes
Sultanzade Hasan Bedreddin Bey	1890	21 January 1909	Buried in the New Mosque; unmarried and without issue
Sultanzade Hüseyin Hayreddin Bey	1892	1987	Unmarried and without issue
Mihriban Hanımsultan	1894	1894	Died at the age of six months, and was buried in Yahya Efendi Cemetery;
Sultanzade Mehmed Saadeddin Bey Osmansoy	14 June 1895	1970	Married and had issue, three sons: Alp Saadeddin Mohamed Bey Osmansoy (b. 1930, had issue, a son and two daughters); Kaya Mohamed Bey Osmansoy (b. 1937); and Aydin Mohamed Bey Osmansoy (b. 1947)
Sultanzade Abdüllah Bey	5 May 1899	5 May 1899	Stillborn, and buried in Yahya Efendi Cemetery; his mother died in childbirth

== See also ==
- Esma Sultan Mansion
- List of Ottoman princesses

== Sources ==
- Brookes, Douglas Scott (2010). The Concubine, the Princess, and the Teacher: Voices from the Ottoman Harem. University of Texas Press. ISBN 978-0-292-78335-5.
- Sakaoğlu, Necdet (2008). Bu mülkün kadın sultanları: Vâlide sultanlar, hâtunlar, hasekiler, kadınefendiler, sultanefendiler. Oğlak Yayıncılık. ISBN 978-9-753-29623-6.
- Uluçay, Mustafa Çağatay (2011). Padişahların kadınları ve kızları. Ankara: Ötüken. ISBN 978-9-754-37840-5.
