= Saliha Sultan (daughter of Abdulaziz) =

Ottoman princess, daughter of Sultan Abdulaziz

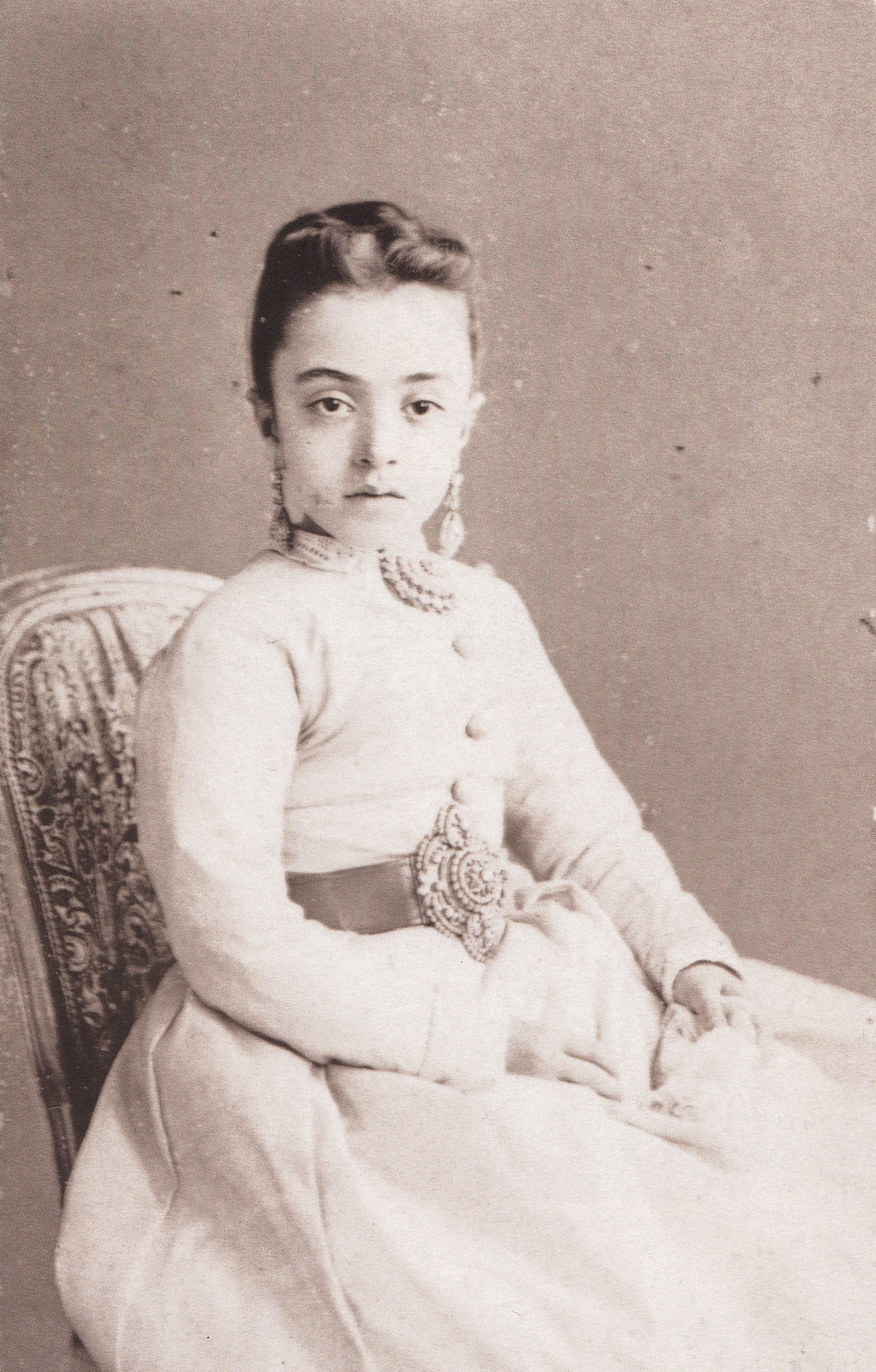
- Saliha Sultan in 1873
- Born: 10 August 1862; Dolmabahçe Palace, Constantinople, Ottoman Empire
- Died: c. 1941 (aged 78–79); Cairo, Kingdom of Egypt
- Burial: Khedive Tewfik Mausoleum, Cairo, Egypt
- Spouse: Ahmed Zülkefil Pasha (m. 1889)
- Issue: Kamile Hanımsultan
Names
- Turkish: Fatma Saliha Sultan; Ottoman Turkish: فاطمه صالحه سلطان
- Dynasty: Ottoman
- Father: Abdulaziz
- Mother: Dürrinev Kadın
- Religion: Sunni Islam

Fatma Saliha Sultan (Ottoman Turkish: فاطمه صالحه سلطان; 10 August 1862 – c. 1941) was an Ottoman princess, the daughter of Ottoman Sultan Abdulaziz and Dürrinev Kadın.

== Early life ==
Saliha Sultan was born on 10 August 1862 at the Dolmabahçe Palace. Her father was Sultan Abdulaziz, son of Mahmud II and Pertevniyal Sultan, and her mother was Dürrinev Kadın, the daughter of Prince Mahmud Dziapş-lpa and Princess Halime Çikotua. She was the eldest daughter of her father and the second child of her mother. She was the younger full sister of Crown Prince Şehzade Yusuf Izzeddin and the elder sister of Şehzade Mehmed Selim, who died at the age of one.

In 1869 she met with the Princess of Wales Alexandra of Denmark when the latter visited Istanbul with her husband the Prince of Wales Albert Edward (future Edward VII).

Her father Abdulaziz was deposed by his ministers on 30 May 1876, his nephew Murad V became the Sultan. He was transferred to the Feriye Palace the next day. Her mother and other women of Abdulaziz's entourage didn't want to leave the Dolmabahçe Palace. So they were grabbed by hand and were sent out to the Feriye Palace. In the process, they were searched from head to toe and everything of value was taken from them. On 4 June 1876, Abdulaziz died under mysterious circumstances.

Saliha Sultan, a fourteen-year-old girl, continued to live in the Feriye Palace with her mother and nineteen-year-old brother.

== Marriage ==
In 1875, Saliha Sultan was engaged to Ibrahim Hilmi Pasha, the son of the Khedive of Egypt Isma'il Pasha. However, the engagement was broken off, after the dismissal of her father in 1876.

In 1889, Sultan Abdul Hamid II arranged her trousseaux and marriage together with her two sisters, Princesses Nazime Sultan and Esma Sultan, as well as his own daughter, Princess Zekiye Sultan. She married Ahmed Zülkefil Pasha, the son of Kurdzade Ismail Hakkı Pasha, on 20 April 1889 in the Yıldız Palace. He became a Damat. The couple were given a waterfront palace located in Fındıklı, Beyoğlu. The two together had a daughter named Kamile Hanımsultan, born in 1890 and died in 1896 at the age of six.

Saliha was proficient at speaking French. On the visit of German Emperor Wilhelm II and his wife German Empress Augusta Victoria of Schleswig-Holstein in 1889, Saliha impressed the empress by her French skills and acted as her interpreter.

In 1917, her palace was confiscated by the Young Turks, and moved to a palace in Ortaköy, previously occupied by Hatice Sultan, daughter of Murad V. Saliha contracted tuberculosis and therefore embarked on a long journey to Europe for her treatment, she first travelled to Berlin, then from there to Switzerland and finally to Vienna.

Following the imperial family was sent to exile in 1924, Saliha and her husband settled in Cairo, Egypt, where they lived in poverty.

== Death ==
Saliha Sultan died in 1941 aged around 79, in Cairo, Egypt, and was buried in the mausoleum of Khedive Tewfik. Her husband died the same year.

== Personality ==
According to Leyla Achba, the lady-in-waiting to Nazikeda Kadın, writes in her memoirs that there was great love and respect between her and Saliha and they were very close. Leyla described her as having almond-shaped hazel eyes, long brown hair and had an elegant demeanour. Furthermore, she was sincere and extremely beautiful, who inherited her looks from her mother, who was the sister of Leyla's own grandmother, Kemalifer Hanım.

== Honours ==
Styles of Saliha Sultan
- Reference style: Her Imperial Highness
- Spoken style: Your Imperial Highness

- Order of the House of Osman
- Order of the Medjidie, Jeweled
- Order of Charity, 1st Class

== Issue ==
Name	Birth	Death	Notes
Kamile Hanımsultan	c. 1890	c. 1896	Died young and was buried in the tomb of Sultan Mahmud II

== Sources ==
- Brookes, Douglas Scott (2010). The Concubine, the Princess, and the Teacher: Voices from the Ottoman Harem. University of Texas Press. ISBN 978-0-292-78335-5.
- Sakaoğlu, Necdet (2008). Bu mülkün kadın sultanları: Vâlide sultanlar, hâtunlar, hasekiler, kadınefendiler, sultanefendiler. Oğlak Yayıncılık. ISBN 978-9-753-29623-6.
- Uluçay, Mustafa Çağatay (2011). Padişahların kadınları ve kızları. Ankara: Ötüken. ISBN 978-9-754-37840-5.
