= Şehzade Mehmed Seyfeddin =

Ottoman prince, son of Sultan Abdulaziz

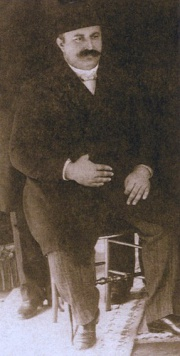
- Born: 22 September 1874; Çırağan Palace, Constantinople, Ottoman Empire (now Istanbul, Turkey)
- Died: 19 October 1927 (aged 53); Nice, France
- Burial: Cemetery of the Sulaymaniyya Takiyya, Damascus, Syria
- Spouse: Neşefelek Hanım (m. 1899) Nervaliter Hanım (m. 1902): Makbule Hanım; Muruvverid Hanım
- Issue: Şehzade Mehmed Abdulaziz; Şehzade Mahmud Şevket; Şehzade Ahmed Tevhid; Gevheri Sultan
Names
- Turkish: Şehzade Mehmed Seyfeddin; Ottoman Turkish: شهزاده محمد سیف الدین
- Dynasty: Ottoman
- Father: Abdulaziz
- Mother: Gevheri Kadın
- Religion: Sunni Islam
- Military career
- Allegiance: Ottoman Empire
- Branch: Ottoman Navy
- Service years: 1916–1922 (active service)
- Rank: See list

Şehzade Mehmed Seyfeddin Efendi (Ottoman Turkish: شهزاده محمد سیف الدین; 22 September 1874 – 19 October 1927) was an Ottoman prince, the son of Sultan Abdulaziz and Gevheri Kadın.

== Early life ==
Şehzade Mehmed Seyfeddin was born on 22 September 1874 in the Çırağan Palace. His father was Abdulaziz, son of Mahmud II and Pertevniyal Sultan, and his mother was Gevheri Kadın. He was the youngest son of his father and the second child of his mother. He was the younger full brother of Esma Sultan.

Abdulaziz was deposed on 30 May 1876 and was succeeded by his nephew Murad V. However Abdulaziz's entourage didn't want to leave the Dolmabahçe Palace. He was transferred to Feriye Palace the next day. On 4 June 1876, Abdulaziz died under mysterious circumstances.

Seyfeddin began his education at Ilhamur Mansion in 1879, along with his siblings Esma Sultan and Şehzade Mehmed Şevket and Sultan Abdul Hamid II's children Şehzade Mehmed Selim and Zekiye Sultan. He spent his childhood and early youth in Feriye Palace along with his sister and mother. He took art and painting lessons at a young age, and was known to be a great composer. His music teachers were Tanbûrî Cemil Bey and Santûrî Edhem Efendi. Besides music he was known for his paintings, poetry and revelation.

== Personal life ==
Seyfeddin had been allocated apartments in the Feriye Palace, and owned a villa in Saudiye. He used to spend his summers in his villa in Saudiye and winters in the Feriye Palace. He also owned a mansion in Camlıça. This mansion once belonged to Necip Molla (died 1890), father of Vahit Bey, a member of the former Council of the State. Seyfeddin first rented the mansion, and bought it in 1894.

=== Marriages ===
Seyfeddin's first wife was Neşefelek Hanım, also known as Necmifelek. She was born on 5 January 1880. They married on 4 December 1899. She was the mother of Şehzade Mehmed Abdulaziz, born on 26 September 1901. She died in 1930 in Nice, France.

His second wife was Nervaliter Hanım. She was born on 27 March 1885 in Poti, Georgia, Caucasus Viceroyalty, Russian Empire. They married on 23 February 1902. On 30 July 1903, she gave birth to her first child, a son, Şehzade Mahmud Şevket, followed by twins, Şehzade Ahmed Tevhid and Fatma Gevheri Sultan, born on 2 December 1904. After the exile, she lived in France. She died in 1935 in Nice.

His third consort was Makbule Hanım. They did not have children.

His fourth consort was Muruvverid Hanım. They did not have children.

=== Personal interests ===
Seyfeddin was a proficient composer, a student of Callisto Guatelli. He used to play piano, fiddle, drums and composed them with an adequate tune. In 1914 he bought the organ from the Chapelle St. Louis and had it brought to Istanbul. His sons Mehmed Abdulaziz, Şehzade Mahmud Şevket and Şehzade Ahmed Tevhid were master drummers. His daughter Gevheri Sultan was a master violinist and drummer with many compositions. He had taught her how to compose music from different instruments, which included the oud (a lyre), the tanbur (a guitar-like instrument), and the lavta (an ancient lute). He composed classical religious and non-religious songs. Today, only two reeds of Seyfeddin, the Khuzzam and Bayati rhymes and a few of them are known.

Apart from music, he also set mahya lights on the minarets of mosques of Istanbul in Ramadan. He personally measured the minarets. He was also interested in painting and sculpture, and was an organist.

== Military career ==
Mehmed Seyfeddin was enlisted in the imperial Ottoman Navy during the reign of his cousin, Sultan Mehmed V. He was given the rank of honorary captain on 7 February 1916. Two years later, on 28 July 1918, he was promoted to the rank of rear-admiral, and later to the rank of vice-admiral.

After the Armistice of Mudros was concluded in October 1918, chaos and invasions emerged in Anatolia. The government sent counselling committees to Anatolia under the leadership of princes and invited the people to peace. For this purpose, two delegations with princes serving head were formed. One of them was sent to Anatolia and the other to Thrace. In April 1919, Seyfeddin serving as the head of one of the delegations, went to Thrace. In the delegation, there were former Minister of War Ferik Cevad Pasha, Chief of the General Staff Ferik Fevzi Pasha and two lieutenants. Scholar Ziyaeddin Efendi a representative from the Foreign Translation Office was also included in the delegation.

For the purpose of bringing the Ottoman navy to a good level during the campaign carried out by the Naval Society during the First World War, Seyfeddin donated 60,000 kuruş to the society. Seyfeddin who was keen on maritime and shipbuilding, went to Vienna and Karsbald thermal springs for treatment in 1918.

== Exile and death ==
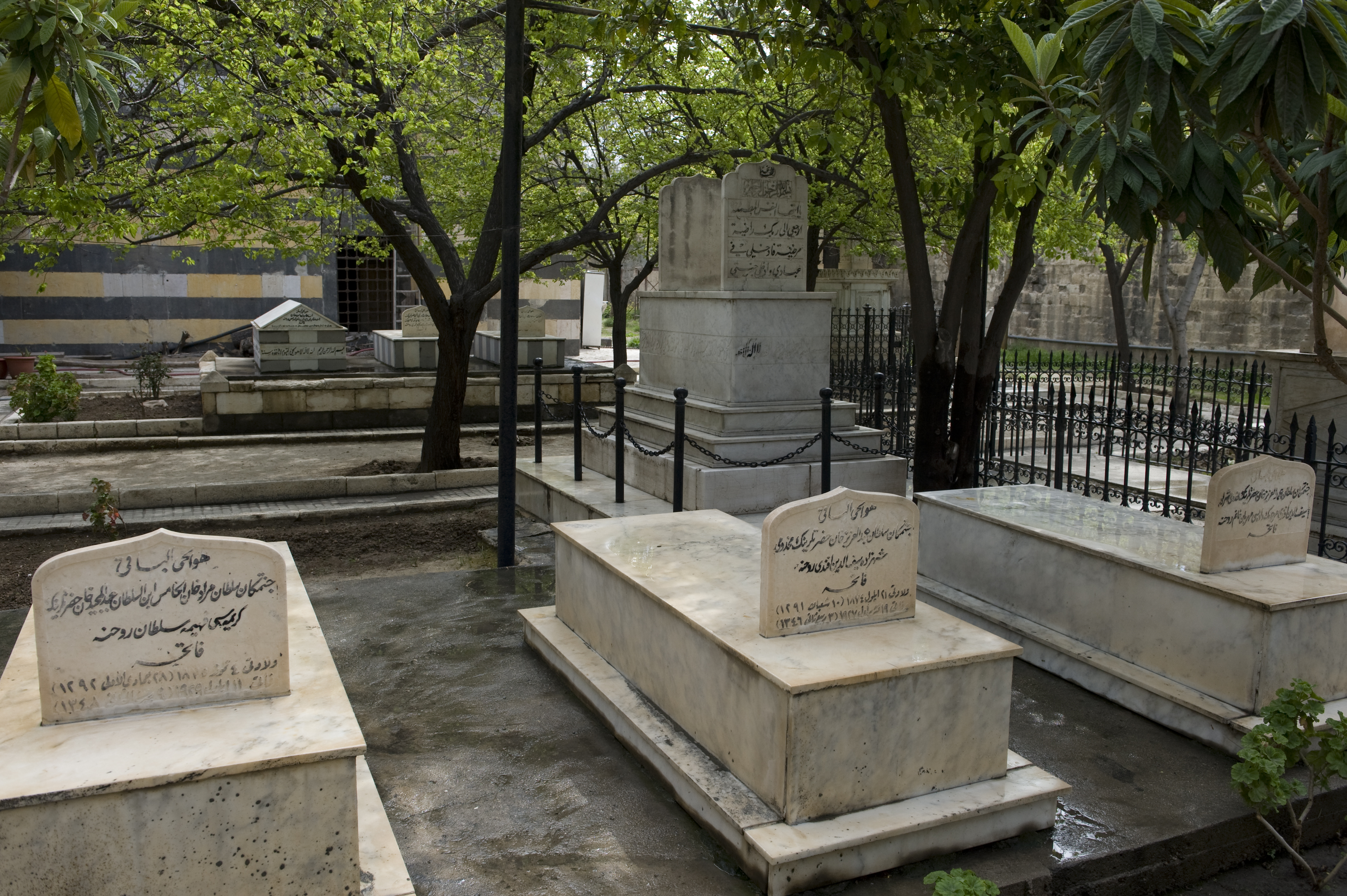
The grave of Seyfeddin (center)

Upon the exile of the imperial family in March 1924, Seyfeddin and his family moved to Cimiez, Nice, France. They bought a villa near the Villa Carabacel which belonged to his cousin Seniha Sultan. He died on 19 October 1927 at the age of fifty-three and was buried in the cemetery of the Sulaymaniyya Takiyya, Damascus, Syria.

== Honours ==
Styles of Şehzade Mehmed Seyfeddin
- Reference style: His Imperial Highness
- Spoken style: Your Imperial Highness

Ottoman honours

- Order of the House of Osman, Jeweled
- Order of Glory, Jeweled
- Order of Osmanieh, 1st Class, 27 July 1884; Jeweled;
- Order of the Medjidie, Jeweled
- Liakat War Medal in Gold
- Hicaz Demiryolu Medal in Gold
- Ottoman War Medal

Foreign honours

- Austria-Hungary: Grand-Cross Order of Leopold, 6 June 1918

=== Military appointments ===
Honorary military appointments

- 7 February 1916: Captain, Ottoman Navy
- 28 July 1918: Rear-Admiral, Ottoman Navy
- Vice-Admiral, Ottoman Navy

== Issue ==
Name	Birth	Death	Notes
By Neşefelek Hanım (married 4 December 1899; 5 January 1880 – 1930)
Şehzade Mehmed Abdulaziz	26 September 1901	19 January 1977	born in Feriye Palace; married once, and had issue, a daughter; died in Nice, France, and buried there
By Nervaliter Hanım (married 23 February 1902; 27 March 1885 – 1935)
Şehzade Mahmud Şevket	30 July 1903	31 January 1973	born in Suadiye Villa; married in 1922 and divorced in 1928 Adile Hanımsultan, daughter of Naime Sultan, and had issue, a daughter; died in exile in Bagnols-sur-Cèze, Gard, France, and buried there
Şehzade Ahmed Tevhid	2 December 1904	24 April 1966	born in Küçük Çamlıca Villa, Üsküdar, twin brother of Gevheri Sultan; died unmarried in exile in Beirut, Lebanon
Fatma Gevheri Sultan	2 December 1904	10 December 1980	born in Küçük Çamlıca Villa, Üsküdar, twin sister of Şehzade Ahmed Tevhid; died unmarried in Taksim Square, Istanbul, and buried in tomb of Sultan Mahmud II

== Sources ==
- Bardakçı, Murat (2017). Neslishah: The Last Ottoman Princess. Oxford University Press. ISBN 978-9-774-16837-6.
- Brookes, Douglas Scott (2010). The Concubine, the Princess, and the Teacher: Voices from the Ottoman Harem. University of Texas Press. ISBN 978-0-292-78335-5.
- Korkmaz, Mehmet (2019-12-30). "Denizin Saraylıları: Bahriye'de Osmanlı Şehzadeleri". Hazine-i Evrak Arşiv ve Tarih Araştırmaları Dergisi (in Turkish). 1 (1): 42–65.
- Uluçay, Mustafa Çağatay (2011). Padişahların kadınları ve kızları. Ankara: Ötüken. ISBN 978-9-754-37840-5.
