= Dürrinev Kadın =

First Consort of Ottoman Sultan Abdülaziz (1835–1895)

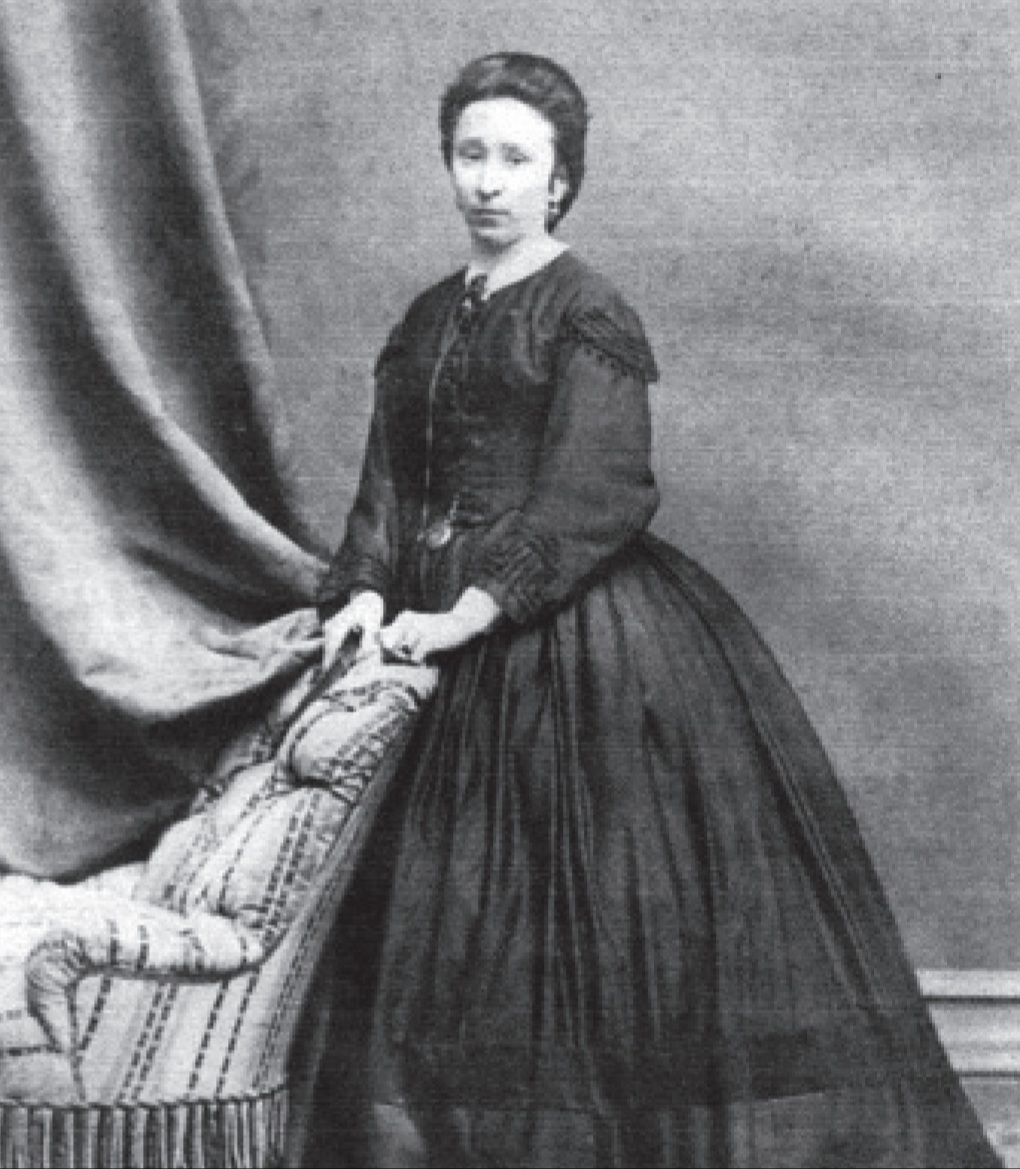

Baş Kadın of the Ottoman Empire (Chief Consort)
- Tenure: 25 June 1861 - 30 May 1876
- Predecessor: Servetseza Kadın
- Successor: Mevhibe Kadın
- Born: Princess Melek Dziapş-İpa; 15 March 1835; Batumi, Caucasus Viceroyalty, Russian Empire (now Batumi, Adjara, Georgia)
- Died: 4 December 1895 (aged 60); Feriye Palace, Istanbul, Ottoman Empire (now Istanbul, Turkey)
- Burial: Sultan Mahmud II Mausoleum, Çemberlitaş, Fatih, Istanbul
- Spouse: Abdulaziz (m. 1856; died 1876)
- Issue: Şehzade Yusuf Izzeddin; Fatma Saliha Sultan; Şehzade Mehmed Selim
Names
- Turkish: Dürrinev Kadın; Ottoman Turkish: درنو قادین
- House: Dziapş-İpa (by birth); Ottoman (by marriage)
- Father: Mahmud Dziapş-lpa
- Mother: Halime Çikotua
- Religion: Sunni Islam

Dürrinev Kadın, also spelled Dürrünev Kadın (Ottoman Turkish: درنو قادین; "new pearl"; born Princess Melek Dziapş-lpa; 15 March 1835 – 4 December 1895) was the Baş Kadin (chief consort) of Sultan Abdulaziz of the Ottoman Empire.

== Early life ==
Dürrinev Kadın was born on 15 March 1835 in Batumi, Georgia. Born as princess Melek Dziapş-lpa, she was a member of the Abkhazian Dziapş-lpa family. Her father was prince Mahmud Bey Dziapş-lpa, and her mother was princess Halime Hanım Çikotua, an Abkhazian. She had two younger sisters. The first was princess Ayşe Kemalifer Hanım (1838 – 1901). She married Ömer Pasha. Her younger daughter, Esma Süreyya Cavidan Hanım became the second consort of Durrinev's son, Şehzade Yusuf Izzeddin, while one of her granddaughters, Emine Nurbanu Hidayet Hanim became a consort of Şehzade Mehmed Burhaneddin, son of Sultan Abdülhamid II. Dürrinev's second sister was princess Aliye Hanım, who married prince Ismail Çikotua and was the mother of Nazperver Kadın, consort of Sultan Mehmed V.

She had been brought to Istanbul as a young child, where her father entrusted her to the imperial harem together with her sister Ayşe. The two of them were then placed in the service of Sultan Abdulmejid I's first wife Servetseza Kadın, where her name according to the custom of the Ottoman court was changed to Dürrinev. She was given a good education: she spoke French without an accent, and was a good pianist and painter. She made paintings which he gave to Bezmiâlem Sultan and Servetseza Kadin. She was blonde and had hazel eyes.

== Marriage ==
One day, when Abdulaziz was in his twenties, he visited his sister-in-law Servetseza Kadın. Here he saw Dürrinev, then twenty one years old, and fell in love with her. He asked his sister-in-law to give him Dürrünev in marriage, but she flatly refused. However, after the prince's pleading to Servetseza, she acceded to her brother-in-law's demand. The marriage took place on 20 May 1856 in the Dolmabahçe Palace.

Dürrinev gave birth to the couple's first child, a son, Şehzade Yusuf Izzeddin on 11 October 1857, who was Abdülaziz's favorite son. Since her husband was not yet sultan, they were forbidden to have children. The child was then hidden until his father ascended the throne. After Abdulaziz's accession to the throne on 25 June 1861, Dürrinev was installed the principal consort with the title of "Baş Kadin". On 10 August 1862, she gave birth to her second child, a daughter, Fatma Saliha Sultan. Four years later, on 28 October 1866, she gave birth to her third child, a son, Şehzade Mehmed Selim, who died at the age of one on 21 October 1867.

In 1869, she met with the Princess of Wales Alexandra of Denmark, when the latter visited Istanbul with her husband Prince of Wales Edward (future Edward VII). Maria Georgina Grey described her during the visit:

The Sultan has only one wife, and she, in the presence of the old Sultana (his mother), is according to their etiquette, not allowed to speak, and I think it was only in honor of our visit that she was not obliged to sit on the floor...The young Sultana (the wife) had a very nice, distinguished face, according to our taste, but is not admired here at all, being considered too thin. She was dressed quite in the European style: a low evening dress covered with lace, and a long train, the Turkish star and ribbon over her shoulder, and, in short, dressed like any European princess.

Abdulaziz was deposed by his ministers on 30 May 1876, his nephew Murad V became the Sultan. He was transferred to Feriye Palace the next day. Dürrinev, and other women of Abdulaziz's entourage didn't wanted to leave the Dolmabahçe Palace. So they were grabbed by hand and were sent out to the Feriye Palace. Dürrinev was imprisoned in the rooms above Abdülaziz's with Şemifer e Zevkyab Hanım. In the process, they were searched from head to toe and everything of value was taken from them. On 4 June 1876, Abdulaziz died under mysterious circumstances. When his body was shown to Dürrinev, she fainted.

== Death ==
Abdülaziz's wives were released on Abdülhamid II's accession to the throne in September 1876, but Dürrinev continued to live in Feriye Palace. Dürrinev Kadın died on 4 December 1895 at the Feriye Palace, and was buried in the mausoleum of Sultan Mahmud II, located at Divan Yolu street, Istanbul.

== Issue ==
Name	Birth	Death	Notes
Şehzade Yusuf Izzeddin	11 October 1857	1 February 1916	married six times, and had issue, two sons and two daughters
Fatma Saliha Sultan	10 August 1862	1941	married once, and had issue, one daughter
Şehzade Mehmed Selim	28 October 1866	21 October 1867	born and died in infancy in Dolmabahçe Palace; buried in tomb of Mahmud II

== See also ==
- Kadın (title)
- Ottoman Imperial Harem
- List of consorts of the Ottoman sultans

== Sources ==
- Açba, Leyla (2004). Bir Çerkes prensesinin harem hatıraları. L & M. ISBN 978-9-756-49131-7.
- Brookes, Douglas Scott (2010). The Concubine, the Princess, and the Teacher: Voices from the Ottoman Harem. University of Texas Press. ISBN 978-0-292-78335-5.
- Sakaoğlu, Necdet (2008). Bu mülkün kadın sultanları: Vâlide sultanlar, hâtunlar, hasekiler, kadınefendiler, sultanefendiler. Oğlak Yayıncılık. ISBN 978-9-753-29623-6.
- Uçan, Lâle (2019). Son Halife Abdülmecid Efendi'nin Hayatı - Şehzâlik, Veliahtlık ve Halifelik Yılları (PDF) (PhD Thesis). Istanbul University Institute of Social Sciences.
- Uluçay, Mustafa Çağatay (2011). Padişahların kadınları ve kızları. Ankara: Ötüken. ISBN 978-9-754-37840-5.
