= Gevheri Kadın =

Consort of Ottoman Sultan Abdülaziz

- Born: Emine Hanim; 8 July 1856
- Died: 6 September 1884 (aged 28); Feriye Palace, Ortaköy, Istanbul, Ottoman Empire (present day Istanbul, Turkey)
- Burial: Imperial ladies mausoleum, New Mosque, Istanbul
- Spouse: Abdulaziz (m. 1872; died 1876)
- Issue: Esma Sultan; Şehzade Mehmed Seyfeddin
Names
- Turkish: Gevheri Kadın; Ottoman Turkish: کوھری قادین
- House: Ottoman (by marriage)
- Father: Salih Bey
- Mother: Şaziye Hanim
- Religion: Sunni Islam

Gevheri Kadın (Ottoman Turkish: کوهری قادین, "gem"; 8 July 1856 – 6 September 1884), born Emine Hanim, was a consort of Sultan Abdulaziz of the Ottoman Empire.

== Life ==
Gevheri Kadın was born on 8 July 1856. She was Abkhazian, daughter of Salih Bey and Şaziye Hanim, prince Tsanba Osman Bey's daughter, and her real name was Emine Hanim. She was sent to the palace as a child and educated to become a consort by Pertevniyal Sultan, Abdülaziz's mother.

She married Abdulaziz in 1872 in the Dolmabahçe Palace, and was given the title of "Senior Ikbal". A year after the marriage, on 21 March 1873, she gave birth to her first child, a daughter, Esma Sultan. On 22 September 1874, she gave birth to her second child, a son, Şehzade Mehmed Seyfeddin in the Çırağan Palace. Sometime later she was elevated to the title of "Fifth Kadın", and in 1875, to the title of "Fourth Kadın".

She had long curly auburn hair and blue eyes. She always wore white dresses with a red sash at the waist and a light blue veil hotoz on her head; her only jewelry were the rings Abdülaziz gave her on their wedding day. Gevheri was a very charitable woman: she helped the poor however she could, paid for the education of young orphans and even supplied funds to repair several mosques and schools.

Abdulaziz was deposed by his ministers on 30 May 1876, and his nephew Murad V became the Sultan. He was transferred to Feriye Palace the next day. Gevheri, and other women in Abdulaziz's entourage didn't want to leave the Dolmabahçe Palace. So they were grabbed by hand and were sent out to the Feriye Palace. In the process, they were searched from head to toe and everything of value was taken from them. On 4 June 1876, Abdulaziz died under mysterious circumstances.

== Death ==
Gevheri and the other wives were released from captivity by Abdulhamid II in September 1876. She then lived with her children with Şehzade Yusuf Izzedin and later in the Ortaköy Palace.

Gevheri died on 6 September 1884 in the Feriye Palace, Ortaköy at the age of twenty-eight, and was buried in the mausoleum of the imperial ladies at the New Mosque Istanbul.

== Issue ==
Name	Birth	Death	Notes
Esma Sultan	21 March 1873	7 May 1899	married once, and had issue, four sons and one daughter
Şehzade Mehmed Seyfeddin	22 September 1874	19 October 1927	married twice, and had issue, three sons and one daughter

== See also ==
- Kadın (title)
- Ottoman Imperial Harem
- List of consorts of the Ottoman sultans

== Sources ==
- Brookes, Douglas Scott (2010). The Concubine, the Princess, and the Teacher: Voices from the Ottoman Harem. University of Texas Press. ISBN 978-0-292-78335-5.
- Sakaoğlu, Necdet (2008). Bu mülkün kadın sultanları: Vâlide sultanlar, hâtunlar, hasekiler, kadınefendiler, sultanefendiler. Oğlak Yayıncılık. ISBN 978-9-753-29623-6.
- Uluçay, Mustafa Çağatay (2011). Padişahların kadınları ve kızları. Ankara: Ötüken. ISBN 978-9-754-37840-5.
- Uçan, Lâle (2019). Son Halife Abdülmecid Efendi'nin Hayatı - Şehzâlik, Veliahtlık ve Halifelik Yılları (PDF) (PhD Thesis). Istanbul University Institute of Social Sciences. Archived from the original (PDF) on 2020-11-27.
