= Mukbile Sultan =

Ottoman princess

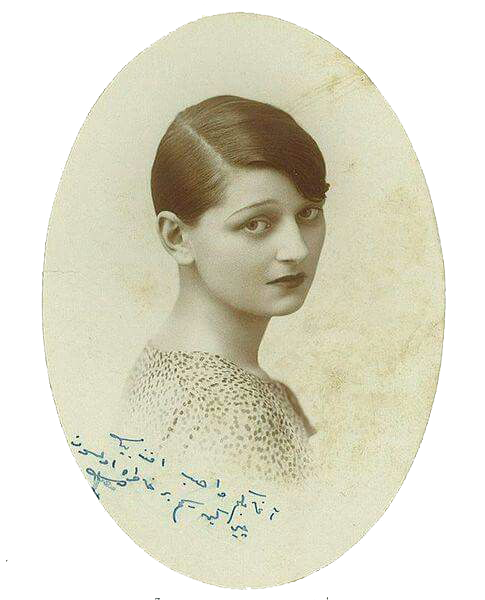
- The text in Ottoman Turkish (using the Arabic alphabet) reads: "To my dear brother, a souvenir of my childhood."
- Born: 17 September 1911; Dolmabahçe Palace, Constantinople, Ottoman Empire (present day Istanbul, Turkey)
- Died: 21 May 1995 (aged 83); Beşiktaş, Istanbul, Turkey
- Burial: Mehmed V Mausoleum, Eyüp, Istanbul
- Spouse: Şehzade Ali Vasib (m. 1931; died 1983)
- Issue: Şehzade Osman Selaheddin Vasib Osmanoğlu
Names
- Turkish: Emine Mukbile Sultan; Ottoman Turkish: امينه مقبله سلطان
- Dynasty: Ottoman
- Father: Şehzade Ömer Hilmi
- Mother: Hatice Firdevs Gülnev Hanım
- Religion: Sunni Islam

Emine Mukbile Sultan (Ottoman Turkish: امينه مقبله سلطان; 17 September 1911 – 21 May 1995) was an Ottoman princess, the daughter of Şehzade Ömer Hilmi, son of Mehmed V.

== Early life ==
Emine Mukbile Sultan was born on 17 September 1911 in the Dolmabahçe Palace. Her father was Şehzade Ömer Hilmi, and her mother was Hatice Fidervs Gülnev Hanım. She was first child and only daughter of her parents. She had a brother, Şehzade Mahmud Namık, two years younger than her. She was the granddaughter of Sultan Mehmed V and Mihrengiz Kadın.

On 29 October 1923, Turkey was officially declared as a republic, and in 1924, the imperial family was exiled, after which her family settled firstly in Beirut, Lebanon, and then in Nice, France.

== Marriage ==
Mukbile was engaged to her second cousin Şehzade Ali Vâsib, the son of Şehzade Ahmed Nihad, and grandson of Şehzade Mehmed Selaheddin in 1928. The two married on 30 November 1931, in Ruhl Hotel in Nice, France. The couple later moved to Maadi, Cairo. Here she, and her husband had to make do with an unassuming apartment on Mosseri Avenue, right next to Maadi's Synagogue. In fact, their landlord was the house principal benefactor Meyr Biton, a close attendant to Haim Nahum Efendi, the Turkish-born Grand Rabbi of Egypt.

They then moved to Alexandria, Egypt in 1935. where on 7 July 1940, she gave birth to the couple's only son, Şehzade Osman Selaheddin Vasib. Here he went to school.

After revocation of the law in 1952, the princesses were allowed to return to Turkey. However, Mukbile chose to stay in Alexandria with her husband and her son. She returned to Istanbul with her husband, and son in 1974, where they settled in Beşiktaş. The same year she visited Dolmabahçe Palace with her son. In 1977, Ali Vâsib became the Head of House of Osman after the death of Şehzade Mehmed Abdulaziz, and died in 1983.

== Death ==
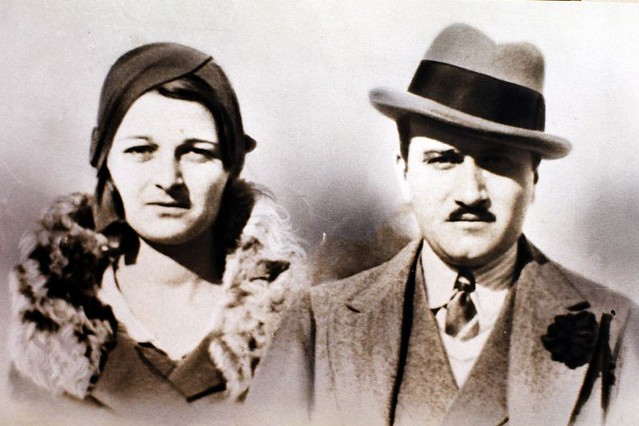
Mukbile Sultan with her husband

Mukbile Sultan died on 21 May 1995 in Beşiktaş, Istanbul at the age of eighty-three, and was buried in the mausoleum of her grandfather in Eyüp, Istanbul.

== Issue ==
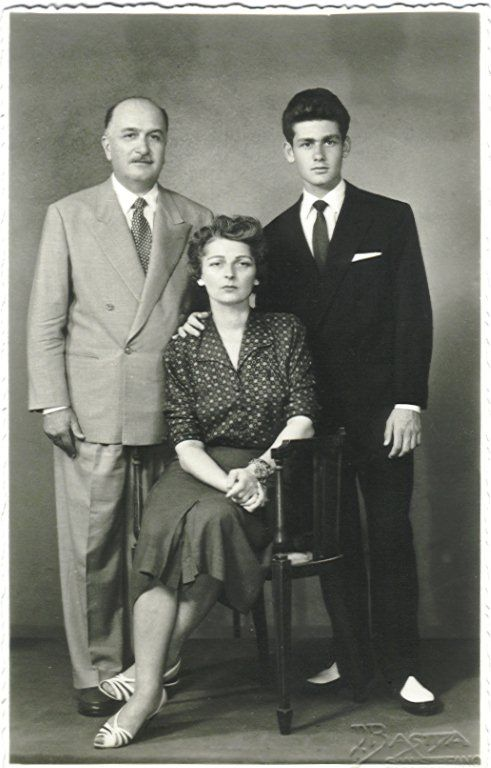
Mukbile Sultan with her husband and their son

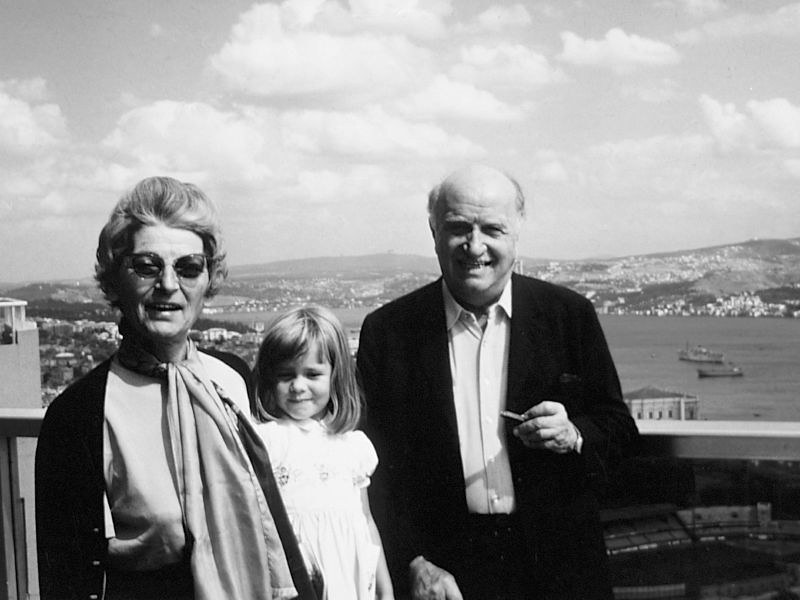
Mukbile Sultan with her husband and their granddaughter Ayşe Gülnev

By her marriage, Mukbile Sultan had an only son:

- Şehzade Osman Selaheddin Vasib Osmanoğlu (b. 7 July 1940, Cairo). On 27 August 1966 he married Athena Joy Christophorides (divorced on 6 May 1991) have three sons and one daughter:
  - Ayşe Gülnev Sultan Osmanoğlu (b. 17 January 1971, England). She is an authoress of historical novels about Ottoman dynasty, like The Gilted Cage on the Bosphorus. She married Nicholas Sutton on 27 August 1994 and has five children:
    - Sultanzade Max Ali Sutton (b. 5 January 2000, London)
    - Sultanzade Cosmo Tarik Sutton (b. 10 September 2001, London)
    - Sultanzade Lysander Gengiz Sutton (b. 12 April 2003, London)
    - Tatyana Aliye Hanımsultan Sutton (b. 2005)
    - Sultanzade Ferdinand Ziya Sutton (b. 26 July 2006)
  - Şehzade Orhan Murad Osmanoğlu (b. 26 December 1972, England). He married Patricia Emine Iotti on 18 February 2001. They have two sons:
    - Şehzade Turan Cem Osmanoğlu (b. 7 January 2004, England)
    - Şehzade Tamer Nihad Osmanoğlu (b. 2006)
  - Şehzade Nihad Reşad Osmanoğlu (b. 17 September 1978 - 19 December 1978, England).
  - Şehzade Selim Süleyman Osmanoğlu (b. 15 December 1979). On 22 June 2003 in Istanbul he married Alev Öcal. They had two children:
    - Şehzade Batu Bayezid Osmanoğlu (b. 2008)
    - Esma Emira Sultan Osmanoğlu (b. 2015)

== Sources ==
- Brookes, Douglas Scott (2010). The Concubine, the Princess, and the Teacher: Voices from the Ottoman Harem. University of Texas Press. ISBN 978-0-292-78335-5.
- Osmanoğlu, Osman Selaheddin (2004). Bir Şehzadenin Hâtırâtı. Yapı Kredi Yayınları.
