= Osmanoğlu family =

Members of the historical ruling house of the Ottoman Empire

Osmanoğlu Family
- Turkish noble family
- Parent family: House of Osman (agnatic line)
- Origin: Turkey
- Founded: c. 1299; 727 years ago
- Founder: Osman I
- Current head: Harun Osman Osmanoğlu
- Titles: Şehzade Sultan Hanımsultan Sultanzade
- Distinctions: Members of the former House of Osman
- Traditions: Sunni Islam
- Motto: Devlet-i Ebed-müddet
- Estate: Topkapı Sarayı Dolmabahçe Sarayı

The Osmanoğlu family is a family belonging to the historical House of Osman, which was the ruling house of the Ottoman Empire from c. 1299 until the abolition of the Ottoman sultanate in 1922, and the Ottoman Caliphate from 1517 until the abolition of the caliphate in 1924. In 1924, members of the Osmanoğlu family were forced into exile. Their descendants now live in many countries throughout Europe, as well as in the United States, the Middle East, and since they have been permitted to return to their homeland, many now also live in Turkey. The female members of the dynasty were allowed to return after 1951, and the male members after 1973. The family adopted the surname Osmanoğlu, meaning "son of Osman"

== Heads of the Osmanoğlu family since 1922 ==
Below is a list of people who would have been heirs to the Ottoman throne following the abolition of the sultanate on 1 November 1922. These people have not necessarily made any claim to the throne; for example Ertuğrul Osman said "Democracy works well in Turkey."

- Mehmed VI, the last Ottoman Sultan (1918–1922) then 36th Head of the House of Osman in exile (1922–1926).
- Abdulmejid II, cousin of Mehmed VI. Last Ottoman Caliph (1922–1924), 37th Head of the House of Osman following Mehmed VI Vahideddin's death (1926–1944).
- Ahmed Nihad, 38th Head of the House of Osman (1944–1954), grandson of Sultan Murad V.
- Osman Fuad, 39th Head of the House of Osman (1954–1973), half-brother of Ahmed IV Nihad.
- Mehmed Abdulaziz, 40th Head of the House of Osman (1973–1977), grandson of Sultan Abdulaziz.
- Ali Vâsib, 41st Head of the House of Osman (1977–1983), son of Ahmed IV Nihad.
- Mehmed Orhan, 42nd Head of the House of Osman (1983–1994), grandson of Sultan Abdul Hamid II.
- Ertuğrul Osman, 43rd Head of the House of Osman (1994–2009), grandson of Sultan Abdul Hamid II. He is known in Turkey as "the Last Ottoman".
- Bayezid Osman, 44th Head of the House of Osman (2009–2017), great-grandson of Sultan Abdulmejid I.
- Dündar Ali Osman, 45th Head of the House of Osman (2017–2021), great-grandson of Sultan Abdul Hamid II.
- Harun Osman, 46th Head of the House of Osman (2021–present), great-grandson of Sultan Abdul Hamid II.

== Resurgence of interest in the Ottoman family ==
Since the turn of the 21st century there has been a growing interest in the living members of the Ottoman family, both within Turkey and abroad.

In 2006, family members met at Dolmabahçe Palace for the presentation of the documentary Osmanoğlu'nun Sürgünü (The Ottomans' Exile) produced by TRT (Turkish Radio and Television Corporation). This documentary followed the stories of the members of the Ottoman family who went into exile in 1924, following the establishment of the Turkish Republic and the abolition of the Ottoman Caliphate. It then follows the stories of their descendants, who now live in Turkey, Europe, India, and North America, and throughout the Middle East. Extensive coverage of the 2006 event, and the success of the documentary series has dramatically raised the profile of the Imperial Family.

According to The New York Times, historians said that the show of reverence at the funeral of Imperial Prince Ertuğrul Osman in September 2009 was a "seminal moment in the rehabilitation of the Ottoman Empire".

The popularity of the historical television series Payitaht Abdulhamid about the Ottoman Empire has grown significantly in recent years in Turkey, and the Turkish government under Recep Tayyip Erdoğan has encouraged a nostalgia for the greatness of the former empire, which is sometimes referred to as 'Neo-Ottomanism'.

An interview with Imperial Prince Mahmud by the Anatolian News Agency was published in several publications in Turkey and the UK.

== Turkish citizenship ==
Without exception, all high-ranking members of the Imperial Ottoman family were exiled in 1924. Most had never left their homeland before, and all were forced to make a new life abroad. The family departed from Sirkeci railway station, and dispersed across Asia, Europe, and the United States. In exile, the family lived in poverty. As the former Ottoman Sultan Mehmed VI Vahideddin had settled in San Remo, many members of the family congregated in the South of France. After living in Switzerland for a short time, the last Caliph of Islam, Imperial Prince (Şehzade) Abdulmecid II, moved to the French Riviera, settling in Nice. The Turkish Republic had issued the exiled Ottoman family members travel documents but they were only valid for one year. Therefore, by 1925 members of the family were no longer able to travel. Prince (Şehzade) Ali Vâsib Efendi appealed to the French Government and succeeded in obtaining courtesy passports for them. The French Government also issued passports to the children of the members of the family who were born in exile. In the years since the exile was lifted in 1973, many members of the Ottoman family have obtained Turkish citizenship and hold Turkish passports.

== Imperial Princes and Princesses of the House of Osman ==
=== Imperial Princes (Şehzades) ===
The formal way of addressing the male descendants of the Ottoman Sultans is Devletlu Necabetlu Şehzade Sultan (given name) Hazretleri Efendi, i.e. Sultan Imperial Prince (given name). According to genealogies of the House of Osman, had the Sultanate not been abolished, there would be twenty-four Imperial Princes in the line of succession after the head of the family, Harun Osman Efendi. The succession law used is agnatic seniority, with the succession passing to eldest male dynast.

Şehzade Harun Osman Efendi (born 22 January 1932, Lebanon; family head since 2021) (descendant of Abdul Hamid II through Şehzade Mehmed Selim Efendi and his son Şehzade Mehmed Abdülkerim Efendi.)

1. Şehzade Osman Selaheddin Osmanoğlu Efendi (born 7 July 1940, Egypt) (descendant of Murad V through Şehzade Mehmed Selaheddin, Ahmed IV and Ali I, and of Mehmed V through Ömer Hilmi and his daughter Mukbile Sultan)
2. Şehzade Ömer Abdülmecid Osmanoğlu Efendi (born 04 June 1941, Egypt) (descendant of Mehmed V)
3. Şehzade Mehmed Ziyaeddin Efendi (born 17 September 1947, Egypt) (descendant of Mehmed V)
4. Şehzade Roland Selim Kadir Efendi (born 5 May 1949, Austria) (descendant of Abdul Hamid II)
5. Şehzade Selim Cem (Djem) Efendi (born 5 September 1955, Germany) (descendant of Abdülmecid I)
6. Şehzade Orhan İbrahim Suleiman Saadeddin Efendi (born 16 July 1959, Lebanon) (descendant of Abdulaziz)
7. Şehzade Mustafa Kemal Stockley Efendi (born 1961) (descendant of Abdul Hamid II)
8. Şehzade Orhan Osmanoğlu Efendi (born 25 August 1963, Syria) (descendant of Abdul Hamid II)
9. Şehzade Eric Mehmed Ziyaeddin Nazim Efendi (born 18 June 1966, America) (descendant of Mehmed V)
10. Şehzade Orhan Murad Osmanoğlu Efendi (born 26 December 1972, England) (descendant of Murad V through Şehzade Mehmed Selaheddin, Ahmed IV and Ali I, and Şehzade Osman Selaheddin Osmanoğlu Efendi)
11. Şehzade Francis Mahmud Namık Osmanoğlu Efendi (born 27 April 1975, England) (descendant of Mehmed V through Ömer Hilmi and Şehzade Mahmud Namık)
12. Şehzade René Osman Abdul Kadir Efendi (born 23 August 1975, Austria) (descendant of Abdul Hamid II)
13. Şehzade Daniel Adrian Abdulhamid Kadir Efendi (born 20 September 1977, Austria) (descendant of Abdul Hamid II)
14. Şehzade Abdulhamid Kayıhan Osmanoğlu Efendi (born 4 August 1979, Turkey) (descendant of Abdul Hamid II)
15. Şehzade Selim Süleyman Osmanoğlu Efendi (born 15 December 1979, England) (descendant of Murad V through Şehzade Mehmed Selaheddin, Ahmed IV and Ali I, and Şehzade Osman Selaheddin Osmanoğlu Efendi)
16. Şehzade Nazım Osmanoğlu Efendi (born 24 September 1985, England) (descendant of Mehmed V)
17. Şehzade Yavuz Selim Osmanoğlu Efendi (born 22 February 1989, Turkey) (descendant of Abdul Hamid II through Şehzade Mehmed Selim)
18. Şehzade Mehmed Süleyman Osmanoğlu Efendi (born 6 November 1989, Turkey) (descendant of Abdul Hamid II through Şehzade Mehmed Selim)
19. Şehzade Turan Cem Osmanoglu Efendi (born 7 January 2004, England) (descendant of Murad V through Ahmed IV )
20. Şehzade Tamer Nihad Osmanoğlu Efendi (born 15 April 2006, England) (descendant of Murad V through Ahmed IV )
21. Şehzade Muhammed Harun Osmanoğlu Efendi (born 1 December 2007, Turkey) (descendant of Abdul Hamid II)
22. Şehzade Batu Bayezid Osmanoğlu Efendi (born 23 April 2008, England) (descendant of Murad V)
23. Şehzade Ziyaeddin Reşad Osmanoğlu Efendi (born 6 June 2012, England) (descendant of Mehmed V through Ömer Hilmi and Mahmud Namık)
24. Şehzade Cem Ömer Osmanoğlu Efendi (born 5 August 2015, England) (descendant of Mehmed V through Ömer Hilmi and Mahmud Namık)
25. Şehzade Abdülaziz Osmanoğlu Efendi (born 11 August 2016, Turkey) (grandson of Harun Osman and descendant of Abdul Hamid II)
26. Şehzade Mehmed Selimhan Osmanoğlu Efendi (born 2024) (grandson of Harun Osman and descendant of Abdul Hamid II)

=== Imperial Princesses (Sultanas) ===
The formal way of addressing the female descendants of the Ottoman Sultans is Devletlû İsmetlu (given name) Sultân Aliyyetü'ş-Şân Hazretleri, i.e. Sultana (given name). According to genealogies of the House of Osman, had the Sultanate not been abolished, there would be eighteen Sultanas:

1. Margot Miriam Leyla Osmanoğlu Sultan (born 17 July 1947, Paris) (descendant of Abdul Hamid II)
2. Nilüfer Osmanoğlu Sultan (born 19 March 1953, Egypt) (descendant of Abdülmecid I)
3. Perihan Osmanoğlu Sultan (born 2 October 1963, Bulgaria) (descendant of Abdülaziz)
4. Ayşe Louise Osmanoğlu Sultan (born 21 March 1964, Turkey) (descendant of Mehmed V)
5. Gülhan Osmanoğlu Sultan (born 30 January 1968, Paris) (descendant of Abdülaziz)
6. Ayşe Gülnev Osmanoğlu Sultan (born 17 January 1969, Paris) (descendant of Murad V)
7. Nurhan Evanthia Osmanoğlu Sultan (born 27 November 1970, Greece) (descendant of Abdul Hamid II)
8. Nilhan Osmanoğlu Sultan (born 25 May 1987, Turkey) (descendant of Abdul Hamid II)
9. Nermin Zoe Osmanoğlu Sultan (born 30 March 1988, Egypt) (descendant of Mehmed V)
10. Emma Osmanoğlu Sultan (born 1992, Damascus) (descendant of Abdul Hamid II)
11. Nilüfer Osmanoğlu Sultan (born 6 May 1995, Turkey) (descendant of Abdul Hamid II)
12. Suzan Osmanoğlu Sultan (born 1997, Netherlands) (descendant of Abdul Hamid II)
13. Ridwan Osmanoglu Sultan (born 1998) (descendant of Abdul Hamid II)
14. Berna Osmanoğlu Sultan (born 1 October 1999) (descendant of Abdul Hamid II)
15. Kristin Koso Osmanoğlu Sultan (born 2000 Yerevan) (descendant of Mehmed V)
16. Asyahan Osmanoğlu Sultan (born 10 January 2004, Turkey) (descendant of Abdul Hamid II)
17. Dilara Ayşe Osmanoğlu Sultan (Aaliyah Isabelle/Aliyya) (born 22 June 2014, Turkey) (descendant of Abdul Hamid II through Şehzade Mehmed Selim. daughter of Şehzade Mehmed Süleyman)
18. Esma Emira Osmanoğlu Sultan (born 18 June 2016, Turkey) (descendant of Murad V through Ahmed IV and Ali I, and of Mehmed V through Ömer Hilmi, daughter of Şehzade Selim Süleyman)
19. Selin Osmanoğlu Sultan (born 17 February 2022) (descendant of Abdul Hamid II)

== Sons of Imperial Princesses (Sultanzades) ==
Sons of an Imperial Princess (Sultanzade)

Sultanzade is an ottoman title meaning "son of a sultan" or "son of a princess" used exclusively for the male-line children born to Imperial Princesses (Sultans)

1. Sultanzade Abbas Hilmi Beyefendi (born 1941) (descendant of Abdülmecid II and Mehmed V)
2. Sultanzade Mehmed Erol Beyefendi (born 1954) (descendant of Mehmed V)
3. Sultanzade Salih Beyefendi (born 1955) (descendant of Mehmed V)
4. Sultanzade Ömer Beyefendi (born 1959) (descendant of Mehmed V)
5. Sultanzade Osman Cem Beyefendi (born 1963) (descendant of Mehmed V)
6. Sultanzade Zekeriya James Beyefendi (born 1992) (descendant of Mehmed V)
7. Sultanzade Maximilian Ali Beyefendi (born 5 January 2000) (descendant of Murad V and Mehmed V)
8. Sultanzade Cosmo Tarık Beyefendi (born 10 September 2001) (descendant of Murad V and Mehmed V)
9. Sultanzade Lysander Cengiz Beyefendi (born 12 April 2003) (descendant of Murad V and Mehmed V)
10. Sultanzade Ferdinand Ziya Beyefendi (born 26 July 2006) (descendant of Murad V and Mehmed V)

== Daughters of Imperial Princesses (Hanımsultans) ==
Hanımsultan or "lady sultan" is a term for the daughters of an Imperial Princess

1. Hanzade Hanımsultan (born 12 September 1903) (descendant of Murad V)
2. Nilülfer Hanımsultan (born 4 January 1916) (descendant of Murad V)
3. Behiye Emel Nuricihan Hanımsultan (born 15 June 1925) (descendant of Mehmed V)
4. Perizad Hanımsultan (born 11 January 1936) (descendant of Mehmed V)
5. Sabiha Fazile Hanımsultan (born 8 August 1941) (descendant of Mehmed V and Abdülmecid I)
6. Katharina Alia Schnelle Hanımsultan (born 1980) (descendant of Abdul Hamid II)
7. Tatyana Aliye Hanımsultan (born 25 March 2005) (descendant of Murad V and Mehmed V)
8. Hanzade Hanımsultan Vatansever (born 2 July 2013) (descendant of Abdul Hamid II)

== More information ==
The Osmanoğlu family is the modern form of the Ottoman dynasty, which ruled from 1299 to 1922 (727 years ago) It was founded by Osman I.

The family lived in palaces, such as the historic Topkapı Palace and the European-inspired Dolmabahçe Palace. Until in March 3, 1924, without exception all 156 members of the House of Osman were exiled following the Abolition of the Caliphate, after the exile the family lived in poverty until in 1951 under Prime Minister Adnan Menderes the exile on the female members and dynasts were lifted. 13 years later the exile was also lifted on the male members and dynasts. They were allowed to return to Turkey and apply for Turkish Citizenship.

Most prominent members of the family are in Turkey. Living private, and normal citizen lives, their former estates and assets were taken by the Turkish state, while most members retain social media presence to share and preserve their family and history’s culture.

The current head of the House of Osman is Harun Osman Osmanoğlu, he is the 46th head of the family.

== See also ==
- Ottoman dynasty, the historical form of the family
- Ottoman Empire, its former ruling empire
