= John Banbury =

John Banbury may refer to:

- Quince Banbury (John Quincy Banbury, 1883–1956), American football player and coach
- John Banbury (MP for Gloucester) (died 1403/04)
- John Banbury (MP for Bristol) (died 1404/05), MP for Bristol
