= Charles Banbury =

Charles Banbury may refer to:

- Charles William Banbury (1877–1914), Baron Banbury
- Charles Banbury, 2nd Baron Banbury of Southam (1915–1981), Royal Warrant of Precedence
- Charles William Banbury, 3rd Baron Banbury of Southam (born 1953)

== See also ==
- Banbury (disambiguation)
