= Banbury (surname) =

Banbury is a surname. The surname was first found in Oxfordshire, in Banbury, a civil parish and market town on the River Cherwell, which is now in the Cherwell District. The derivation is from the pre-7th Century Old English personal name "Ban(na)a" and "burh", meaning "Banna's fort" or fortified manor.

Notable people with the surname include:

- Fernley H. Banbury (1881–1963), English engineer
- Fred Everest Banbury (1893–1918), Canadian flying ace during World War I
- Frederick Banbury, 1st Baron Banbury of Southam (1850–1936), British businessman, Conservative Member of Parliament
- Frith Banbury (1912–2008), British actor
- Ian Banbury, (born 27 November 1957), UK cyclist
- Jabez Banbury (1830–1900), British-born American Civil War veteran
- Jen Banbury (21st century), American playwright & author
- John Banbury (disambiguation), multiple people
- Quince Banbury (1883–1956), American football player and coach
- W. F. Banbury (1879–1975), American football player and coach
- The Earl of Banbury (1547–1632), colonel of the foot regiments enrolled to assist the Armada
