= Nazperver Kadın =

Consort of Ottoman Sultan Mehmed V (1870–1929)

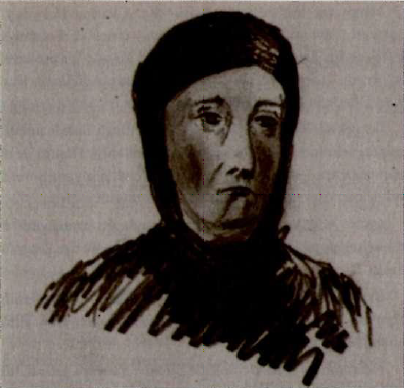
- Born: Rukiye Hanım Çikotua; 12 June 1870; Beşiktaş, Istanbul, Ottoman Empire
- Died: 9 March 1929 (aged 58); Vaniköy, Üsküdar, Istanbul, Turkey
- Spouse: Mehmed V
- Issue: Refia Sultan
Names
- Turkish: Nazperver Kadın; Ottoman Turkish: نازپرور قادین
- House: Ottoman (by marriage)
- Father: Prince Ismail Bey Çikotua
- Mother: Princess Aliye Hanım Dziapş-lpa
- Religion: Sunni Islam

Nazperver Kadın (Ottoman Turkish: نازپرور قادین; born Rukiye Çikotua; 12 June 1870 – 9 March 1929) was the fourth consort of Sultan Mehmed V of the Ottoman Empire.

== Life ==
Her real was name Rukiye Hanim. She was born on 12 June 1870 in Beşiktaş to Prince Ismail Çikotua and Princess Aliye Dziapş-lpa. She was sent to the palace to her aunt Dürrinev Kadın (her mother's sister) to be educated, and she learned French especially well. She played the piano, the ud and the zither. During a dinner, she was noticed by Şehzade Mehmed Reşad (the future Mehmed V), who married her in Veliahd Palace in 1888. She was his fourth consort. In 1888 she give birth to Mehmed's only daughter, Refia Sultan, but the princess died before the year's end. She would have wanted more children, but she never had any more and their absence was a source of sadness for her throughout her life, despite the fact that the sultan always showed her affection and respect.

On 27 April 1909, after Mehmed's accession to the throne, she was given the title of "Fourth Kadın". Upon the death of Dürriaden Kadın in October 1909, Nazperver was elevated to the title of "Third Kadın". She was described as a beautiful woman, with very long curly golden hair, blue eyes, pale skin, full lips, tall and shapely.

After the declaration of Ottoman Empire's entry in World War I in 1914, women who took part in several organisations. During this time, Nazperver also took part in the Women's Organisation for National consumption (Turkish: İstihlak-ı Milli Kadınlar Cemiyeti). The purpose of the organisation was to promote the use of locally produced goods. During World War I, she visited hospitals which she also helped with her own money. Wherever she went, crowds poured out on the streets to see her and would scream “May Allah protect you, Your Highness”. She was loved by many .

Safiye Ünüvar, a teacher at the Palace School, who met her in 1915, described her as being plump, and tall. According to Ünüvar, Nazperver did not appear particularly learned, but she did have a refined and kindly air about her that made a good impression. She also speculated that having no children weighed heavily upon her, despite the fact that the Sultan treated her most kindly and graciously, and so she lived out her life in this rather downhearted fashion.

On 30 May 1918, Nazperver met with the Empress Zita of Bourbon-Parma in the harem of Yıldız Palace, when the latter visited Istanbul with her husband Emperor Charles I of Austria. During the Empress's visit, she liaised with her in French, with great surprise of the Empress.

Nazperver and Dilfirib Kadın, Mehmed's fifth consort were with him, when he died on 3 July 1918. After Mehmed V’s death, she first moved to her family’s mansion in Beşiktaş and then to Fatma Pesend’s in Vaniköy. At the exile of the imperial family in March 1924, Nazperver as being the adjunct member of the family decided to stay in Istanbul. Her niece Princess Mülkicihan Açba was present when she died: “What is this, Mülkicihan?” “What is what, Your Highness?” “Look, Mülkicihan, look. The sky has opened up. Do you hear this sound? The Lord is coming to take me to my daughter. God willing, I will be able to see my Master again.” She died on 9 March 1929 in Vaniköy.

== Issue ==
- Refia Sultan (1888 - 1888). She was Mehmed's only daughter. The sources differ: according to some she died on the same day of her birth, according to others she drowned at few months.

== See also ==
- Kadın (title)
- Ottoman Imperial Harem
- List of consorts of the Ottoman sultans

== Sources ==
- Brookes, Douglas Scott (2010). The Concubine, the Princess, and the Teacher: Voices from the Ottoman Harem. University of Texas Press. ISBN 978-0-292-78335-5.
- Sakaoğlu, Necdet (2008). Bu mülkün kadın sultanları: Vâlide sultanlar, hâtunlar, hasekiler, kadınefendiler, sultanefendiler. Oğlak Yayıncılık. ISBN 978-9-753-29623-6.
- Uluçay, Mustafa Çağatay (2011). Padişahların kadınları ve kızları. Ankara: Ötüken. ISBN 978-9-754-37840-5.
