= Dilfirib Kadın =

Wife of Ottoman Sultan Mehmed V

- Born: c. 1890; Istanbul
- Died: c. 1952 (aged 61–62); Erenköy, Istanbul, Turkey
- Burial: Istanbul
- Spouse: Mehmed V Second husband
- Issue: Second marriage Fülan Bey
Names
- Turkish: Dilfirib Kadın; Ottoman Turkish: دل فریب قادین
- House: Ottoman (by marriage)
- Religion: Sunni Islam

Dilfirib Kadın (Ottoman Turkish: دل فریب قادین, "deceitful heart"; c. 1890 – c. 1952) was the fifth and last consort of Sultan Mehmed V of the Ottoman Empire.

== Life ==
Dilfirib Kadın was born in 1890 in Istanbul. She was Circassian. She married Mehmed in 1907 as his fifth consort. She remained childless. On 27 April 1909, after Mehmed's accession to the throne, she was given the title of "Senior Ikbal". She was later elevated to the title of "Fourth Kadın" when Dürriaden Kadın died in October 1909. Safiye Ünüvar, a teacher at the Palace School, who met her in 1915, described her as being young and well educated. Safiye Ünüvar wrote that she was friends with her and that their friendship continued until her death.

On 30 May 1918, Dilfirib met with the Empress Zita of Bourbon-Parma in the harem of Yıldız Palace, when the latter visited Istanbul with her husband Emperor Charles I of Austria. With her beauty, she won the Empress's appreciation.

Dilfirib and Nazperver Kadın, Mehmed's fourth wife, were with him when he died on 3 July 1918. After the sultan's death, she remained in the Yıldız Palace. When the imperial family went into exile in 1924, she moved into her villa located in Erenköy and she married a doctor, with whom she had a son. She died in 1952 from cancer.

== See also ==
- Kadın (title)
- Ottoman Imperial Harem
- List of consorts of the Ottoman sultans

== Sources ==
- Brookes, Douglas Scott (2010). The Concubine, the Princess, and the Teacher: Voices from the Ottoman Harem. University of Texas Press. ISBN 978-0-292-78335-5.
- Sakaoğlu, Necdet (2008). Bu mülkün kadın sultanları: Vâlide sultanlar, hâtunlar, hasekiler, kadınefendiler, sultanefendiler. Oğlak Yayıncılık. ISBN 978-9-753-29623-6.
- Uluçay, Mustafa Çağatay (2011). Padişahların kadınları ve kızları. Ankara: Ötüken. ISBN 978-9-754-37840-5.
