= Şehzade Ali Vasib =

Şehzade Ali Vâsib
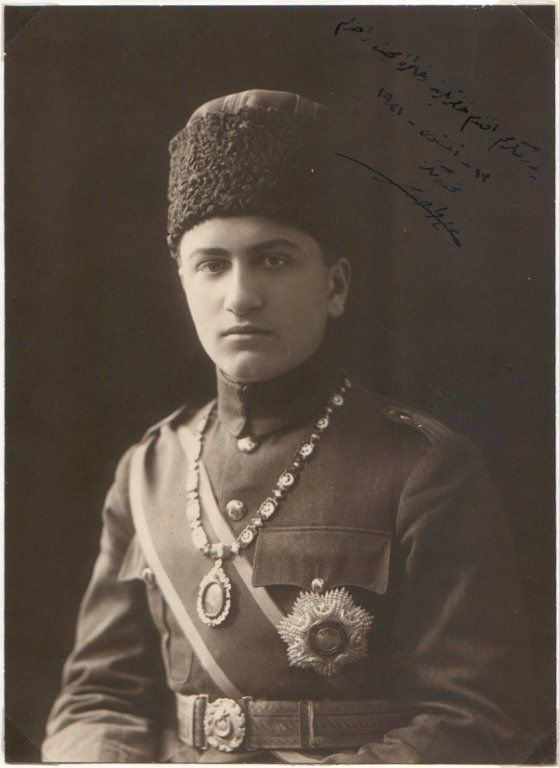

Head of the Osmanoğlu family
- Term: 19 January 1977 – 9 December 1983
- Predecessor: Şehzade Mehmed Abdulaziz
- Successor: Şehzade Mehmed Orhan
- Born: 13 October 1903; Çırağan Palace, Istanbul, Ottoman Empire
- Died: 9 December 1983 (aged 80); Alexandria, Egypt
- Burial: East Side Cemetery, Nice, France
- Spouse: Mukbile Sultan (m. 1931)
- Issue: Şehzade Osman Selaheddin Osmanoğlu
- House: Ottoman
- Father: Şehzade Ahmed Nihad
- Mother: Safiru Hanım
- Religion: Sunni Islam

Şehzade Ali Vâsib Efendi (also Ali Vasib Osmanoğlu; 13 October 1903 – 9 December 1983) was an Ottoman prince. From 1977 to his death in 1983, he was the 41st head of the Imperial House of Osman, the Ottoman royal dynasty.

== Early life ==
Vâsib was born on 13 October 1903 in Çırağan Palace, one year before his parents' enforced residence at the palace came to an end in 1904. His father was Ahmed Nihad, only son of Şehzade Mehmed Selaheddin and Naziknaz Hanm. His mother was Safiru Hanım. Ali Vasib was very attached to Şayan Kadın, his paternal great grandfather's third consort, who chose to stay at Çırağa Palace even after Murad's death. Vasib called her "third grandmother" and often went to see her.

Vasib was educated at the Galatasaray High School and Harbiye in Istanbul. He attained the rank of Lieutenant in the Ottoman army infantry. He achieved the "Collar of the Hanedan-ı-Ali-Osman" and the "Mecidi Nişan", 1st Class.

== Marriage ==
On 30 November 1931, Vâsib married his half second cousin once removed Mukbile Sultan, the only daughter of Şehzade Ömer Hilmi, at the Ruhl Hotel in Nice, France. Mukbile was the granddaughter of Sultan Mehmed V (half-brother of Sultan Murad V, great-grandfather of Vasib). The couple had one son, Şehzade Osman Selaheddin Vâsib Osmanoğlu, born on 7 July 1940), a chartered accountant. He married Athena Joy Christoforides; they have three sons and one daughter and grandchildren.

== Exile ==
After the formation of the Republic of Turkey in 1923 and the abolition of the Ottoman Sultanate and the Caliphate in the following year, Vasib and other members of his family were forced into exile. They left Istanbul from Sirkeci railway station. Vasib lived in Budapest for a few months, before settling in Nice, France. Other family members moved to the South of France and to Italy, including Vahideddin, (Mehmed VI) who went to San Remo; and Abdulmecid II, (Vasib's cousin and the last Caliph) to Nice, after a short time in Switzerland.

=== French passports ===
The travel documents issued by the Turkish Republic to the members of the House of Osman on their exile were valid for only one year. Vasib intervened with the French government to obtain passports for them. Vasib made contact with the French minister, Count Castellane through General Toulouse and his son, Captain Toulouse, who was a friend. The French passports listed the family as having Ottoman nationality and acknowledged their imperial titles.

=== Alexandria ===
In January 1935, Vasib moved to Alexandria, Egypt with his wife and her family. For the next 18 years, Vasib was the Director of the Antoniadis Palace, which served to accommodate foreign heads of state and dignitaries visiting Alexandria.

== Later years ==
Vasib was permitted to return to Turkey in 1974. From that time, he visited annually and his wife lived in a humble rented flat in the old part of the city near Sultan Ahmed Square. Vasib's memoirs have been published in Turkish. Vasib's son, Osman Selaheddin, transcribed the work from Ottoman Turkish script to present-day Turkish script.

=== Succession ===
On 19 January 1977, following the death of his cousin, Şehzade Mehmed Abdulaziz, Vasib became head of the House of Osman. Had Vâsib become the reigning sultan, he would have been "Sultan Ali I".

== Death ==
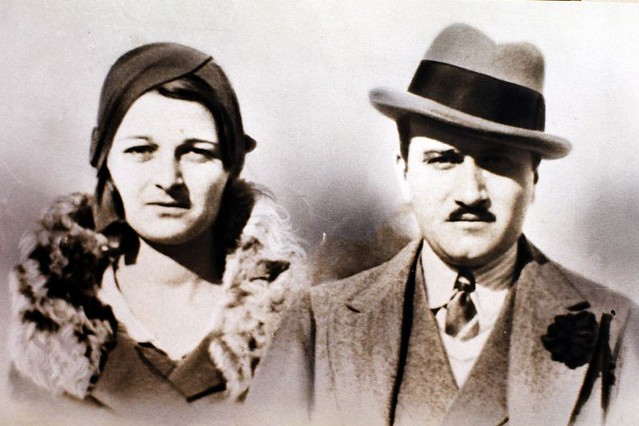
Ali Vasib with his wife

On 9 December 1983, in Alexandria, Vasib died from a stroke. He was 80. He was buried in Alexandria and later his remains were moved to Sultan Mehmed V Reşad Mausoleum, Eyüp. At the time of his death, he was the oldest living Ottoman prince. On his death, the Monarchist League wrote: "Prince Ali Vasib will be remembered as a man of great charm. His ease of manner and his gifts as a raconteur were the hallmarks of one of the last of the grands seigneurs of the Gotha."

== Issue ==
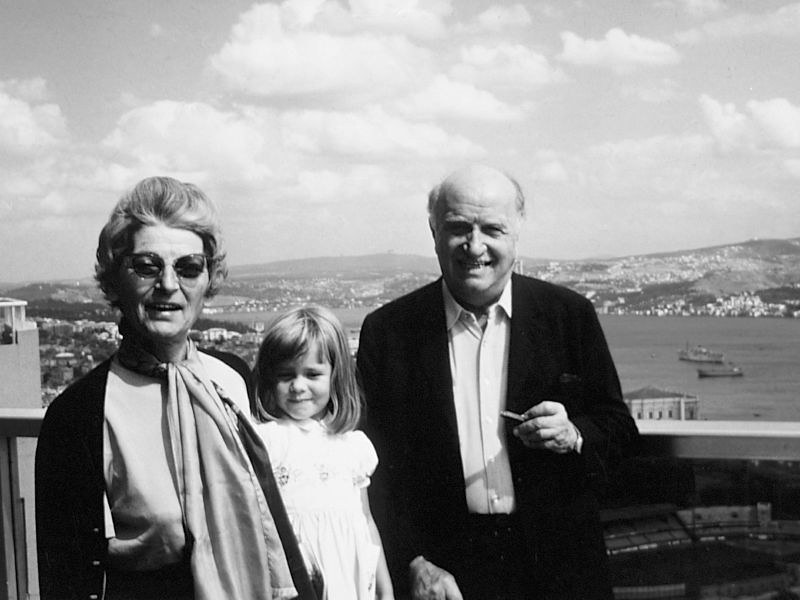
Ali Vasib with his wife and their granddaughter Ayşe Gülnev

By his wife, Şehzade Ali Vasib had an only son:

- Şehzade Osman Selaheddin Vasib Osmanoğlu (b. 7 July 1940). Married to Athena Joy Christophorides, they have three sons and one daughter:
  - Ayşe Gülnev Sultan Osmanoğlu (b. 17 January 1971, England). She is an author of historical novels about Ottoman dynasty, like The Gilded Cage on the Bosphorus. She married Nicholas Sutton on 27 August 1994 and has five children:
    - Sultanzade Max Ali Sutton (b. 5 January 2000, London)
    - Sultanzade Cosmo Tarik Sutton (b. 10 September 2001, London)
    - Sultanzade Lysander Gengiz Sutton (b. 12 April 2003, London)
    - Tatyana Aliye Hanımsultan Sutton (b. 2005)
    - Sultanzade Ferdinand Ziya Sutton (b. 26 July 2006)
  - Şehzade Orhan Murad Osmanoğlu (b. 26 December 1972, England). He married Patricia Emine Iotti on 18 February 2001. They have two sons:
    - Şehzade Turan Cem Osmanoğlu (b. 7 January 2004, England)
    - Şehzade Tamer Nihad Osmanoğlu (b. 2006)
  - Şehzade Nihad Reşad Osmanoğlu (b. 17 September 1978 – 19 December 1978, England).
  - Şehzade Selim Süleyman Osmanoğlu (b. 15 December 1979). On 22 June 2003 in Istanbul he married Alev Öcal. They have two children:
    - Şehzade Batu Bayezid Osmanoğlu (b. 2008)
    - Esma Emira Sultan Osmanoğlu (b. 2015)

== See also ==
- Line of succession to the former Ottoman throne

Şehzade Ali Vasib House of Osman Born: 13 October 1903 Died: 9 December 1983
Preceded by Mehmed Abdulaziz	Head of the Osmanoğlu family 19 January 1977 – 9 December 1983	Succeeded by Mehmed Orhan
