= Şehzade Mehmed Orhan =

Head of the Osmanoğlu family (1909–1994)

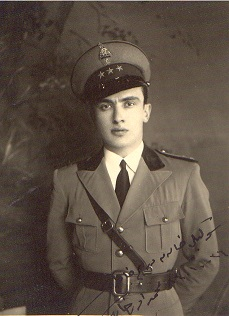
- Orhan Effendi in the military clothing of Albania

Head of the Osmanoğlu family
- Term: 9 December 1983 – 12 March 1994
- Predecessor: Şehzade Ali Vasib
- Successor: Şehzade Ertuğrul Osman
- Born: 12 October 1909; Naime Sultan Palace, Üsküdar, Istanbul, Ottoman Empire
- Died: 12 March 1994 (aged 84); Nice, France
- Burial: 14 March 1994; East Side Cemetery, Nice, France
- Spouse: Nafia Hanım (m. 1932; div. 1933) Marguerite Fournier (m. 1940; div. 1945) Francesca Franchetti (m. 1946; div. 1951)
- Issue: Fatma Necla Sultan; Şehzade Mehmed Selim; Ayten Sultan
- House: Ottoman
- Father: Şehzade Mehmed Abdülkadir
- Mother: Mihriban Hanım

Şehzade Mehmed Orhan Efendi (Ottoman Turkish: محمد اور خان; also Mehmed Orhan Osmanoğlu; 12 October 1909 – 12 March 1994) was an Ottoman prince and the 42nd head of the Ottoman dynasty from 1983 to 1994. He was the advisor of King Zog I of the Albanians and succeeded as head of the Ottoman dynasty on 9 December 1983, following the death of Şehzade Ali Vâsib.

== Early life ==
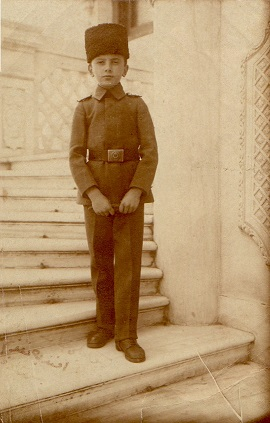
Prince Mehmed Orhan in childhood

Şehzade Mehmed Orhan was born on 12 October 1909 in Üsküdar. According to his aunt Ayşe Sultan, he was born in Naime Sultan's Palace. His father was Şehzade Mehmed Abdülkadir, son of Abdul Hamid II and Bidar Kadın, and his mother was Mihriban Hanım, an ethnic Abkhazian. After his parents divorced in 1913, he and his mother went to live in with his uncle. He was then enrolled in Galatasaray High School and Robert College.

== Life in exile ==
At the exile of the Imperial Family in March 1924, Mehmed Orhan settled in Budapest, Hungary. He then went to live with his uncle in Beirut, Lebanon, and then to his aunt Naime Sultan in Nice, France. From here he moved to Buenos Aires, Argentina, where he lived for two and a half years.

Mehmed Orhan worked as shipbuilder and picture seller at an art gallery in São Paulo, Brazil, taxi driver in Beirut, Lebanon, and Damascus, Syria, a cemetery attendant in the United States of America and an Advisor of King Zog I of the Albanians.

From 1983, following the death of Ali Vâsib, he served as the head of the imperial house from his home in Nice, France. In a 1990 feature in Life magazine, he said his legacy is "both sacred and laughable," and said, "To be Ottoman is to know how to breathe with time."

== Personal life ==
Mehmed Orhan's first wife was Nafia Hanım. She was the third daughter of Ali Reza Bey of the Yeğen family and wife Nimet Hanım. They married in 1932. She was mother of a daughter, Fatma Necla Sultan, born in 1933. After the two divorced in 1933, she married Prince Abbas Halim of Egypt. Her eldest sister, Berkemal Hanım, was married to Mehmed Abdulaziz, 40th head of the Ottoman dynasty from 1973 to 1977, and was the mother of the couple's only daughter, Hürrem Sultan.

His second wife was Marguerite Hanım Fournier, a French woman. They married in 1940 in Paris, France. They were parents of a son, Şehzade Mehmed Selim Osmanoğlu, born in 1943. The two divorced in 1945.

His third wife was Francesca Hanım Franchetti, who was the daughter of an Italian Baron. They married after 1945 and divorced after seven years. The two together had a daughter named Ayten Sultan.

== Death ==
Mehmed Orhan died at the age of eighty-four on 12 March 1994 in Nice, France. He was buried two days later on 14 March in the East Side Cemetery in Nice. In 2010, Nice Municipality removed the bones from his grave and placed them into the ossuary number 3 in the same cemetery, citing the fact that the license to use the burial place was not paid for years and the family couldn't be reached.

== Issue ==
Mehmed Orhan had two sons and two daughters::

- Fatma Necla Sultan Osmanoğlu (born Cairo, 14 September 1933 – Zürich, 2010) – with Nafia Hanim, married Damat ... Germann and had two sons:
  - Sultanzade Mehmed Erol Germann (born 1952);
  - Sultanzade Osman Cem Germann (born 1963);
- Şehzade Mehmed Selim Osmanoğlu (born Paris, 3 October 1943) – with Marguerite Fournier, married and had one daughter:
  - Claris Sultan Osmanoğlu (born 1971)
- Ayten Sultan Osmanoğlu (born 1940s) – with Francesca Franchetti, unmarried and without issue
- Şehzade Ali Khan Orhan Efende (born in Brazil on 12/11/1962) - with Anna Gomes Pereira Alcalai ), page=24

== See also ==
- Line of succession to the former Ottoman throne

== Sources ==
- Bardakçı, Murat (2008). Son Osmanlılar: Osmanlı Hanedanı'nın Sürgün ve Miras Öyküsü. İnkılâp. ISBN 978-9-751-02616-3.

Şehzade Mehmed Orhan House of Osman Born: July 11 1909 Died: March 12 1994
| Preceded by Ali Vâsib | Head of the Osmanoğlu family 9 December 1983 – 12 March 1994 | Succeeded by Ertuğrul Osman |
