= Mihrengiz Kadın =

Consort of Ottoman Sultan Mehmed V

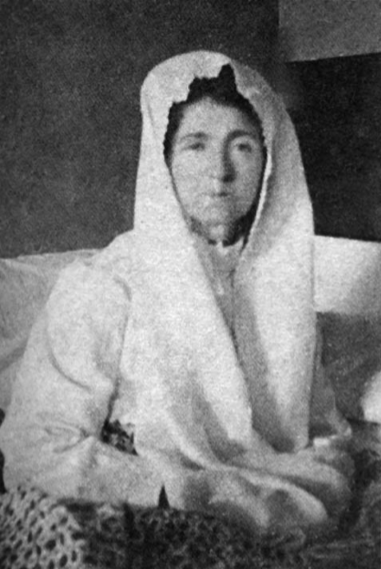
- Born: Fatma Hanim; 15 October 1869; Adapazarı or Sochi
- Died: 12 December 1938 (aged 69); Alexandria, Egypt
- Burial: Khedive Tewfik Pasha Mausoleum, Cairo, Egypt
- Spouse: Mehmed V
- Issue: Şehzade Ömer Hilmi
Names
- Turkish: Fatma Mihrengiz Kadın; Ottoman Turkish: مھرانکیز قادین
- House: Ottoman (by marriage)
- Religion: Sunni Islam

Fatma Mihrengiz Kadın (Ottoman Turkish: مهرانکیز قادین, "sun's/light's daughter"; 15 October 1869 – 12 December 1938) was the third consort of Sultan Mehmed V of the Ottoman Empire.

== Early life ==
Mihrengiz Kadın was born on 15 October 1869. Official records state that she was born in Adapazarı but Harun Açba believes that she was born in Sochi instead and that she had fled to the Ottoman Empire with her family during the Russo-Turkish War of 1877–1878. Her real name was Fatma. In any case, she received a good education in the palace, where she learned to play the piano. Mihrengiz had a brother named Ibrahim Bey, who served as the third chamberlain to the sultan.

== Marriage ==
Mihrengiz married Mehmed as his third consort, when he was a prince, on 4 April 1887. After Sultan Abdul Hamid II's accession to the throne in 1876, Mehmed became the crown prince, after which they settled in the crown prince's apartments located in the Dolmabahçe Palace. On 2 March 1886, she gave birth to her only child, a son, Şehzade Ömer Hilmi. On 27 April 1909, after Mehmed's accession to the throne, she was given the title of "Third Kadın". At the end of 1909, after the death of Dürriaden Kadın, she became "Second Kadın".

Safiye Ünüvar, a teacher at the Palace School, whom she met in 1915, noted in her memoirs that unlike the other wives, Mihrengiz was slim, while the others were quite heavier. This was because she had been suffering from illness for the past few years.

On 30 May 1918, Mihrengiz met with the Empress Zita of Bourbon-Parma in the harem of Yıldız Palace, when the latter visited Istanbul with her husband Emperor Charles I of Austria.

== Philanthropy ==
In 1912, the "Hilal-i Ahmer Centre for Women" was organized within the "Ottoman Hilal-i Ahmer Association", a foundation established in 1877 to provide medical care in Istanbul and surrounding communities. Mihrengiz was a member of this organization.

In May 1915, Mihrengiz visited the soldiers at the Haydarpasha Hospital together with some other women from the imperial harem. During her visit she also addressed the soldiers:

How are you, my soldier sons, my soldier brothers! What do you wish for? We are all at your service! If I knew how to bandage your wounds, I would pay great attention and devotion to you and circle around your head end like a capable nurse. You are very precious to us.

== Last years and death ==
After Mehmed's death, she settled with her son. At the exile of the imperial family in March 1924, Mihrengiz, her son, Ömer Hilmi and his two children, Emine Mukbile Sultan, and Şehzade Mahmud Namık, settled firstly in Beirut, Lebanon, then in Nice, France, and finally settling in Alexandria, Egypt, where Ömer Hilmi died in 1935. She died on 12 December 1938 at Alexandria at the age of sixty-nine, having outlived her son by three years. She was buried in the mausoleum of Khedive Tewfik Pasha in Cairo.

== Issue ==
| Name | Birth | Death | Notes |
|---|---|---|---|
| Şehzade Ömer Hilmi | 2 March 1886 | 6 April 1935 | married five times, and had issue, one son and one daughter |

== See also ==
- Kadın (title)
- Ottoman Imperial Harem
- List of consorts of the Ottoman sultans

== Sources ==
- Uluçay, M. Çağatay (2011). Padişahların kadınları ve kızları. Ötüken. ISBN 978-9-754-37840-5.
- Sakaoğlu, Necdet (2008). Bu Mülkün Kadın Sultanları: Vâlide Sultanlar, Hâtunlar, Hasekiler, Kandınefendiler, Sultanefendiler. Oğlak Yayıncılık. ISBN 978-6-051-71079-2.
- Brookes, Douglas Scott (2010). The Concubine, the Princess, and the Teacher: Voices from the Ottoman Harem. University of Texas Press. ISBN 978-0-292-78335-5.
