= Şehzade Mahmud Necmeddin =

Ottoman prince, son of Sultan Mehmed V

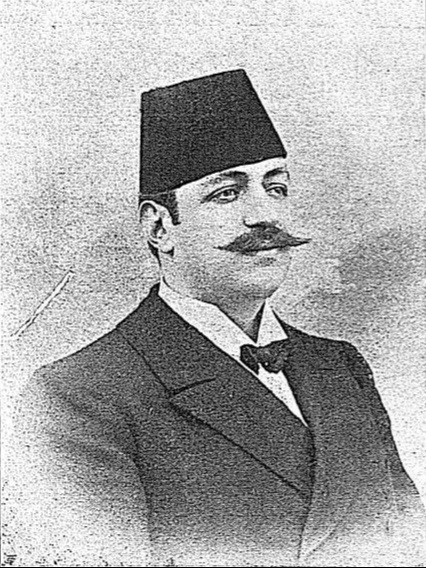
- Born: 23 June 1878; Dolmabahçe Palace, Constantinople, Ottoman Empire (present day Istanbul, Turkey)
- Died: 27 June 1913 (aged 35); Kuruçeşme Palace, Kuruçeşme, Ottoman Empire (present day Istanbul, Turkey)
- Burial: Mehmed V Mausoleum, Eyüp, Istanbul
- Dynasty: Ottoman
- Father: Mehmed V
- Mother: Dürriaden Kadın
- Religion: Sunni Islam

Şehzade Mahmud Necmeddin Efendi (Ottoman Turkish: شہزادہ محمود نجم الدین; 23 June 1878 – 27 June 1913) was an Ottoman prince, second son of Sultan Mehmed V and his second consort Dürriaden Kadın.

== Early life ==
Şehzade Mahmud Necmeddin was born on 23 June 1878 in the apartment of the crown prince, Dolmabahçe Palace. His father was Mehmed V, son of Abdulmejid I and Gülcemal Kadın, and his mother was Dürriaden Kadın. He was circumcised with Şehzade Abdülkadir, Abdülhamid II’s son.

== Public life ==
On 2 September 1909, Necmeddin travelled to Bursa with his father, Sultan Mehmed V, and brothers, Şehzade Mehmed Ziyaeddin and Şehzade Ömer Hilmi. On 13 June 1910, he and his brothers received Şehzade Yusuf Izzeddin at the Sirkeci railway station, when he came from a his first visit to Europe. On 5 June 1911, he and other princes received Izzeddin at the station after he came back from his second visit to Europe. Between 5 and 26 June 1911, Necmeddin travelled to Rumelia with his father and brothers.

== Personal life ==
After his father's accession to the throne, Necmeddin was given apartments in the Dolmabahçe Palace, and Yıldız Palace. In 1910, he came into possession of a villa in Kuruçeşme. Here he sponsored a fountain in his mother's name after her death in 1909.

Necmeddin liked music. He was described as a person who engaged in conversation, and whose innate intelligence one grasped immediately. He was quite appealing of face, but suffered physical hindrances. He was born with kyphosis, morbidly obese, and his left ear lay flat against his head. His ill health was of great concern to his mother.

== Death ==
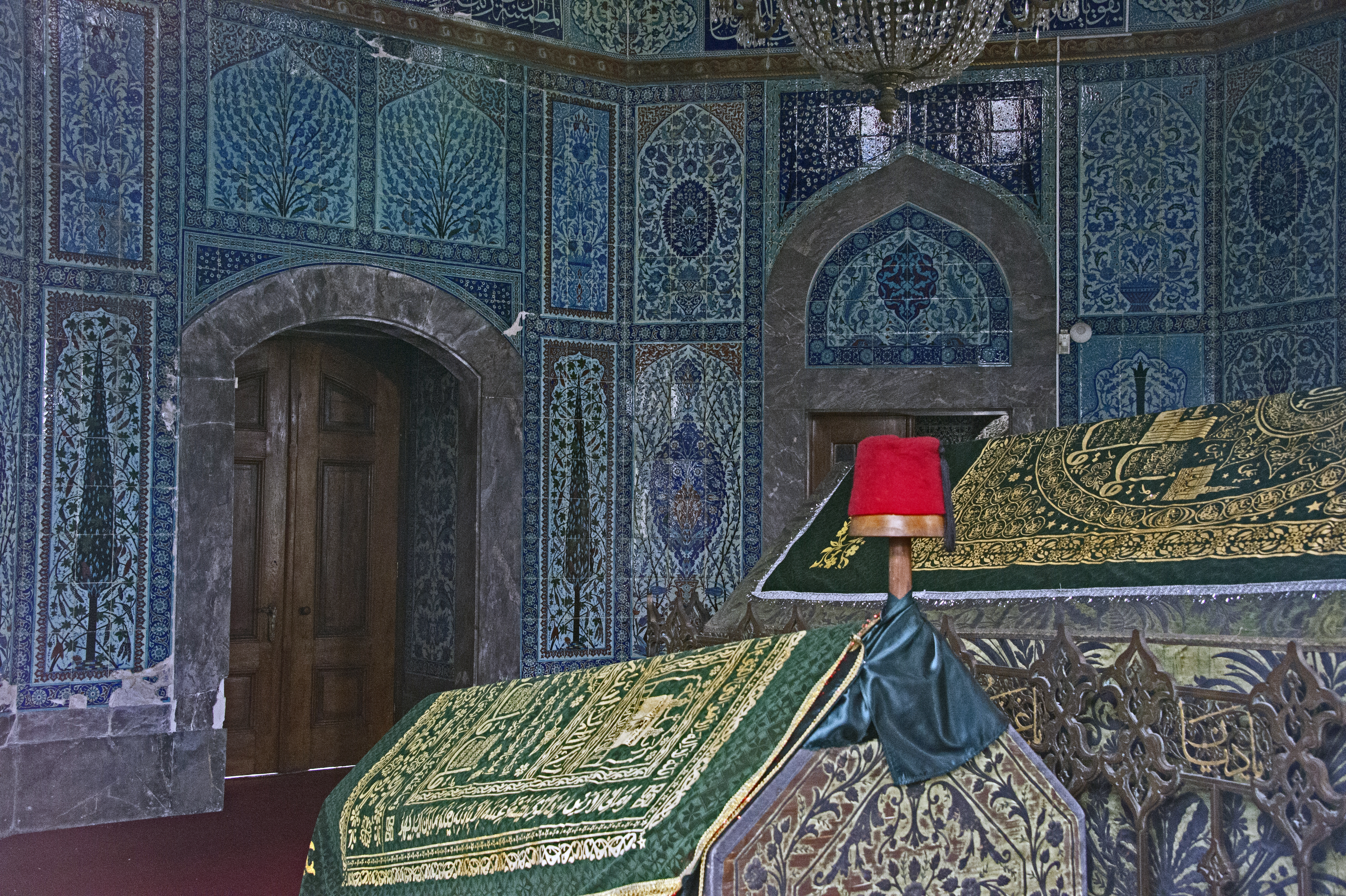
Sarcophagus of Şehzade Mahmud Necmeddin located inside the tomb of Sultab Mehmed V

Şehzade Mahmud Necmeddin died of diseases related to the stomach and heart on 27 June 1913, and was buried in the tomb of his father located in Eyüp. His palace in Kuruçeşme passed to his stepmother Kamures Kadın after his death.

== Honours ==
- Order of the House of Osman
- Order of Osmanieh, 1st Class
- Order of the Medjidie, Jeweled
- Hicaz Demiryolu Medal in Gold

== Sources ==
- Alp, Ruhat (2018). Osmanlı Devleti'nde Veliahtlık Kurumu (1908–1922) (PhD Thesis) (in Turkish). Hacettepe University Institute of Social Sciences.
- Brookes, Douglas Scott (January 1, 2010). The Concubine,the Princess, and the Teacher:Voices from the Ottoman Harem. University of Texas Press. ISBN 978-0-292-78335-5.
- Brookes, Douglas S. (February 4, 2020). On the Sultan's Service: Halid Ziya Uşaklıgil's Memoir of the Ottoman Palace, 1909–1912. Indiana University Press. ISBN 978-0-253-04553-9.
- Ekim, Zeynep Emel (2018). Sultan V. Mehmed Reşad ve Dönemi – Cilt 3: Sultan Mehmed Reşad'ın Oğlu Necmeddin Efendi'nın Kuruçeşme'deki Yalısı. TBMM Milli Saraylar. ISBN 978-9-752-46418-6.
- Gün, Fahrettin (2018). Sultan V. Mehmed Reşad ve Dönemi – Cilt 3: Sultan Mehmed Reşad'ın Oğlu Şehzade Ziyaeddin Efendi (1873-1938). TBMM Milli Saraylar. ISBN 978-9-752-46418-6.
