= Şehzade Ömer Hilmi =

Ottoman prince

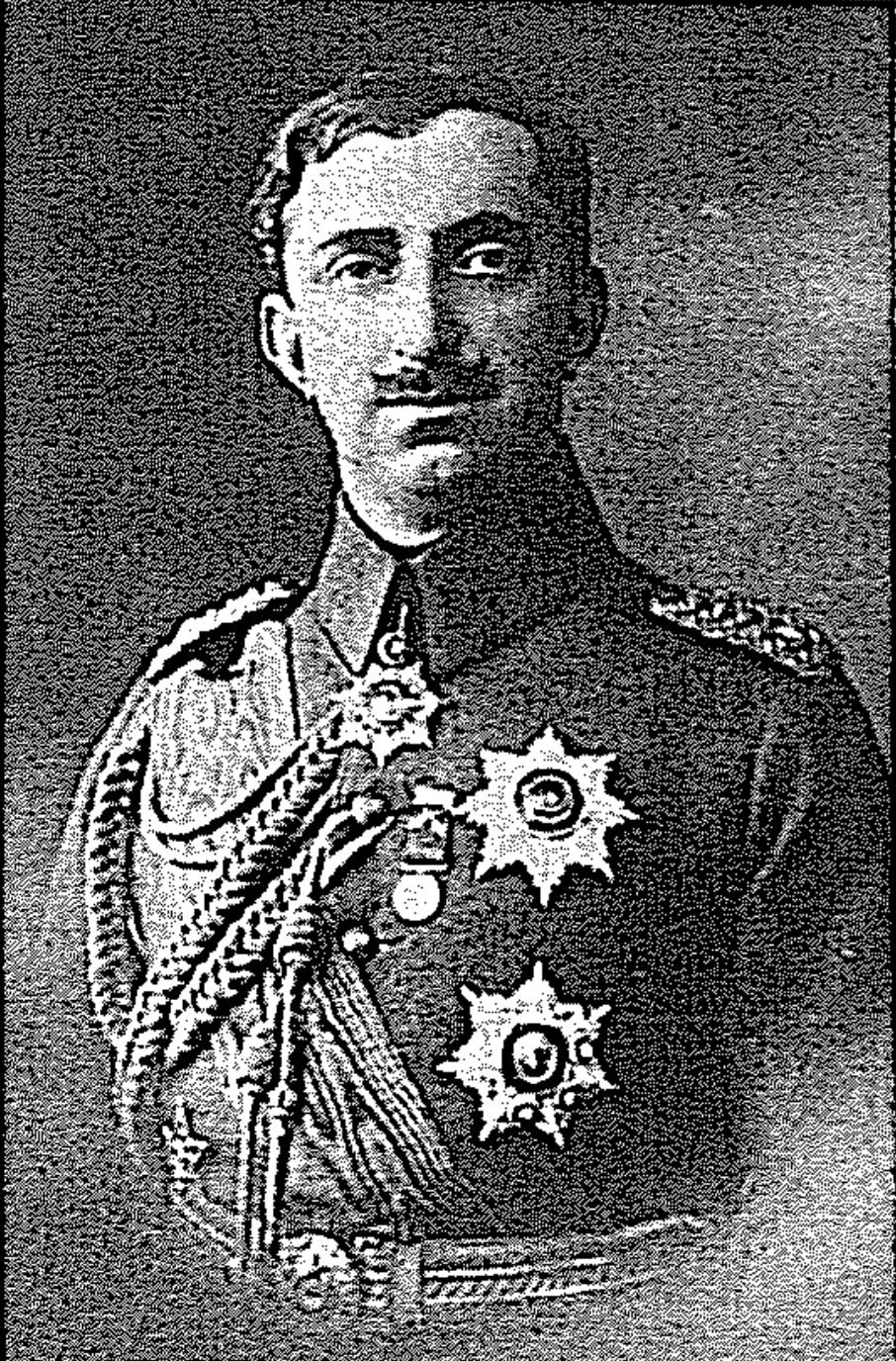
- Born: 2 March 1886; Dolmabahçe Palace, Constantinople, Ottoman Empire (present day Istanbul, Turkey)
- Died: 6 April 1935 (aged 49); Alexandria, Egypt
- Burial: Khedive Tewfik Pasha Mausoleum, Cairo
- Spouse: Faika Hanım (m. 1907; div. 1907) Nesimter Hanım (div. 1915) Hatice Firdevs Gülnev Hanım (m. 1910; died 1919) Başter Hanım (m. 1914) Mediha Hanım (m. 1921)
- Issue: Emine Mukbile Sultan; Şehzade Mahmud Namık
- Dynasty: Ottoman
- Father: Mehmed V
- Mother: Mihrengiz Kadın
- Religion: Sunni Islam
- Military career
- Allegiance: Ottoman Empire
- Branch: Ottoman Army
- Service years: 1916–1922 (active service)
- Rank: See list

Şehzade Ömer Hilmi Efendi (Ottoman Turkish: شہزادہ عمر حلمى; 2 March 1886 – 6 April 1935) was an Ottoman prince, the third son of Sultan Mehmed V, and his consort Mihrengiz Kadın. His great-granddaughter, Ayşe Gülnev Osmanoğlu, is an author of historical novels on the history of the Ottoman dynasty.

== Early years ==
Şehzade Ömer Hilmi was born in the apartment of the crown prince, Dolmabahçe Palace, on 2 March 1886. His father was Mehmed V, son of Abdulmejid I and Gülcemal Kadın, and his mother was Mihrengiz Kadın.

In 1911 and 1912, Ömer Hilmi attended the Imperial War College with his eldest brother Şehzade Mehmed Ziyaeddin. In 1916, during the First World War he served as Honorary Colonel of Infantry in the Imperial Ottoman Army.

On 2 September 1909, Ömer Hilmi travelled to Bursa with his father, Sultan Mehmed Reşad, and brothers, Şehzade Ziyaeddin and Şehzade Mahmud Necmeddin. On 13 June 1910, he and his brothers received Şehzade Yusuf Izzeddin at the Sirkeci railway station, when he came from his first visit to Europe. On 5 June 1911, he and other princes received Izzeddin at the station after he came back from his second visit to Europe. Between 5 and 26 June 1911, he travelled to Rumelia with his father and brothers.

On 15 October 1917, he met with the German emperor Wilhelm II, when the latter visited Istanbul in 1917. On 9 May 1918, he also met with the Emperor Charles I of Austria, when the latter visited Istanbul in 1918, with his wife Empress Zita of Bourbon-Parma.

He was known to openly support the nationalists, and was against his father's policies.

== Personal life ==
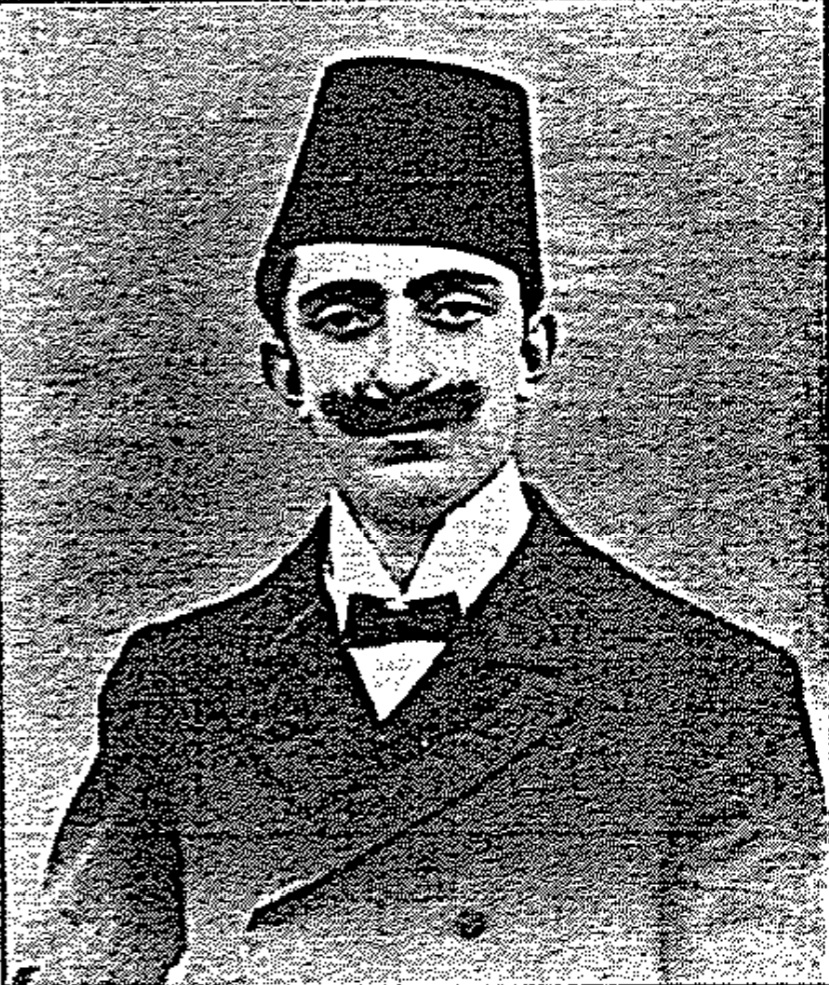

Ömer Hilmi's first wife was Faika Hanım. She was the daughter of Mehmed Bey and Ayşe Hanım. She belonged to an influential noble clan, the Hunç, who were founding members of the village, and for this reason, the village was also known as Hunça Hable. She had two elder sisters, Naciye Hanım, and Hayriye Melek Hanım, who is considered Turkey's first female author of Circassian origin. She was of medium height, slim with blonde hair, blue eyes, and a cute face. She was the most beautiful among her sisters. The two married on 10 November 1907. Faika could not get along with Ömer Hilmi, and he divorced her two times but united again. However, then hülle (interim marriage necessary before a divorced woman can remarry her formed husband) was required since he divorced her three times. She did not accept hülle because there were not any men in palace, and so she was dismissed from the palace of Prince Mehmed Reşad. After her divorce on 20 December 1907, she got her paycheck regularly, but later she could not out of fear of being informed on. She and her sisters were banished to Bursa by Sultan Abdul Hamid II, where they lived until the proclamation of the Second Constitutional Era in 1908. They left Bursa right after the declaration of the constitution.

His second wife was Nesimter Hanım. The two divorced in January 1915.

His third wife was Hatice Firdevs Gülnev Hanım. She was born on 21 February 1890. Her father was a Turkish officer from Ayvalık, and her mother was Ayşe Hanım. They married on 3 October 1910. She gave birth to two children, Emine Mukbile Sultan, born in 1911, followed by Şehzade Mahmud Namık, born in 1913. She died on 31 December 1919, aged twenty nine.

His fourth wife was Başter Hanım, married on 16 June 1914.

His fifth wife was Mediha Hanım, married on 12 July 1921.

Ömer Hilmi had been allocated apartments in the Dolmabahçe Palace. In 1910, he came into possession of the villa in Bağlarbaşı, built by the Egyptian Khedive Isma'il Pasha in the hills above Üsküdar, Istanbul, on the Asian side of the Bosphorus. He also owned another villa in Nişantaşı.

He was described as an attractive and vigorous man, and one who shied away from conversation.

== Exile and death ==
Upon the exile of the imperial family in March 1924, Ömer Hilmi, his mother, and his two children, settled firstly in Beirut, Lebanon, then in Nice, France, and finally in Alexandria, Egypt. He died in Alexandria on 6 April 1935, aged forty nine, and was buried there. His remains were later interred in the mausoleum of Khedive Tewfik Pasha in Cairo, Egypt. His mother outlived him by three years, dying in 1938.

== Honours ==
- Order of the House of Osman
- Order of Osmanieh, 1st Class; Jeweled
- Order of the Medjidie, Jeweled
- Hicaz Demiryolu Medal in gold
- Liakat War Medal in Gold
- Imtiyaz War Medal in Silver

=== Military appointments ===
Honorary military ranks and army appointments

- 1916: Colonel of the Infantry, Ottoman Army
- Aide-de-Camp to the Sultan

== Issue ==
Name	Birth	Death	Notes
By Gülnev Hanım (married October 1910; 21 February 1890 – 31 December 1919)
Emine Mukbile Sultan	17 September 1911	21 May 1995	born in Dolmabahçe Palace; married Ali Vâsib and had issue, an only son; buried in tomb of Sultan Mehmed V
Şehzade Mahmud Namık	23 December 1913	13 November 1963	born in Dolmabahçe Palace; married and had issue, a son; died at Cairo, Egypt, and buried in tomb of Khedive Tewfik, Cairo, later transferred to tomb of Sultan Mahmud II in 1987

== Sources ==
- Alp, Ruhat (2018). Osmanlı Devleti'nde Veliahtlık Kurumu (1908–1922) (PhD Thesis) (in Turkish). Hacettepe University Institute of Social Sciences.
- Brookes, Douglas Scott (2010). The Concubine, the Princess, and the Teacher: Voices from the Ottoman Harem. University of Texas Press. ISBN 978-0-292-78335-5.
- Gün, Fahrettin (2018). Sultan V. Mehmed Reşad ve dönemi. TBMM Milli Saraylar. ISBN 978-9-752-46418-6.
- Arslan, Elmas Zeynep (Aksoy) (2008). Circassian Organizations in the Ottoman Empire (1908-1923) (PDF) (MA in History thesis). Boğaziçi University.
- Çare, Mêral (Çizemuğ) (2018). Bir Çerkes Ubıh Yazar Kadın Portresi: Hayriye Melek Hunç.
