= Banbury (disambiguation) =

Banbury is a market town located on the River Cherwell in northern Oxfordshire, England.

Banbury may also refer to:

== Surname/family name ==
- Banbury (surname)

== Transport ==
- Banbury railway station, a railway station in Oxfordshire, England

== Politics ==
- Banbury (UK Parliament constituency), a constituency represented in the House of Commons of the Parliament of the United Kingdom.
- Banbury Rural District, a rural district in Oxfordshire, England.

== Ships ==
- ST Banbury Cross, a tugboat

== Places ==
- Banbury Oaks, California, USA
- Banbury, Toronto, Ontario, Canada
- Banbury, Oxfordshire, UK

== Sport ==
- Banbury United F.C.

== Industry ==
- Banbury Mixers A brand of internal batch mixer.

== Miscellaneous ==
- "Banburies", cards used in the cryptanalytic process of Banburismus
