= Şehzade Mahmud Namık =

Ottoman noble (1913–1963)

- Born: 23 December 1913; Dolmabahçe Palace, Constantinople, Ottoman Empire (present day Istanbul, Turkey)
- Died: 13 November 1963 (aged 49); Cairo, Egypt, United Arab Republic
- Spouse: Şehrazad Hanım (m. 1939; div. 1947)
- Issue: Şehzade Ömer Abdülmecid
- House: Ottoman
- Father: Şehzade Ömer Hilmi
- Mother: Hatice Fidervs Gülnev Hanım
- Religion: Sunni Islam

Şehzade Mahmud Namık Efendi (Ottoman Turkish: شهزاده محمود نامك; 23 December 1913 – 13 November 1963) was an Ottoman prince, the only son of Şehzade Ömer Hilmi, and his third consort Hatice Fidervs Gülnev Hanım. He was the grandson of Sultan Mehmed V Reşad and Mihrengiz Kadın.

Mahmud Namık was an active member of the "Zohriya Set", a group of exiled members of the Ottoman dynasty who lived in the Cairo suburb of Maadi, along with members of the Egyptian royal family and their entourage. Mahmud Namık was implicated in the "Restoration Plot" to overthrow Gamal Abdel Nasser and replace him on the restored throne with Prince Muhammad Abdel Moneim. His trial and subsequent imprisonment made headlines around the world.

== Early life and exile ==
Şehzade Mahmud Namık was born on 23 December 1913 in the Dolmabahçe Palace. His father was Şehzade Ömer Hilmi, son of Sultan Mehmed V and Mihrengiz Kadın and his mother was Hatice Fidervs Gülnev Hanım.

He lived there until the death of his grandfather, Sultan Mehmed V, just before the end of World War I on 4 July 1918. He then moved with his family to Bağlarbaşı, Üsküdar.

Upon the exile of the imperial family in March 1924, Namık, then aged ten, and his family settled in Beirut, Lebanon, and later in Nice, France. In May 1933, they moved to Alexandria, Egypt, where his father died in 1938.

== Personal life ==
Namık's only wife was Şehrazad Hanım. She was the daughter of Ismail Ratib Bey, and his wife Princess Emine Bihruz, daughter of Prince Ibrahim Rashid Fazil Pasha of Egypt. She was born in 1922. They married in 1939. On 4 June 1941, she gave birth to Şehzade Ömer Abdülmecid in Alexandria. By the early 1940s, he kept an apartment with his wife in the Maadi suburb of Cairo. They divorced in 1947. She died in 1993.

== Arrest, trial and imprisonment ==
Namık was accused of involvement in a plot to bring down the military regime of Gamal Abdel Nasser in favour of the one time Regent Muhammad Abdel Moneim or his son. In 1957, there were reports that Namık and Neslişah Sultan met in Saint Moritz, France, in the summer of 1956, to identify the person who would be placed on Egypt's throne. Years later Julian Amery, a former British Intelligence officer and a Conservative MP advocating continued British presence in the Middle East, confirmed in his writings that the prince, together with several Egyptian dissidents, had indeed attended anti-Nasser meetings in Geneva and the South of France in August 1956.

On 29 April 1958, he was tried in absentia on charges of plotting against Nasser, and was sentenced to fifteen years in jail. Luckily for him he was in Europe at the time. In 1958 he was asked to help negotiate the marriage of Princess Sabiha Fazile Hanımsultan, the only daughter of Prince Muhammad Ali Ibrahim of Egypt and Princess Hanzade Sultan, to King Faisal II of Iraq. The engagement was ended by the murder of King Faisal II, following a military coup on 14 July 1958.

For his utter misfortune Namık was in Iraq on 14 July 1958 when a bloody revolution broke out in that country. Mending fences with its republican neighbors, the new military junta offered the captured prince to a pitiless Nasser in exchange for improved relations with Egypt. Namık was thus flown to Cairo on 31 August 1958 to face retrial receiving a fifteen year jail sentence in Tora Prison.

== Death ==
Mahmud died at the age of forty-nine from a stroke in Cairo, Egypt, United Arab Republic, on 13 November 1963. The funeral took place in the garden of the prison, and was attended by relatives and a few Turkish citizens living in Cairo. He was buried in the private tomb of his former wife, Şehrazad Hanım. In 1977, he was reburied in the mausoleum of Sultan Mahmud II in Istanbul.

== Issue ==
By his wife, he had an only son:

- Şehzade Ömer Abdülmecid Namık (Alexandria, 4 June 1941 - Paris, March 2003). He married Beulah Banbury Hanım (8 April 1943 - Paris, 21 February 2003). They had a son:
  - Şehzade Mahmud Francis Namık-Banbury (b. London, 27 April 1975)

== Bibliography ==
- Bardakçı, Murat (2017). Neslishah: The Last Ottoman Princess. American University in Cairo Press. ISBN 978-977-416-837-6.
