= John Banbury (MP for Gloucester) =

English politician

John Banbury (died 1403/1404), of Gloucester, was an English politician.

He was a member (MP) of the parliament of England for Gloucester in January 1390.
