= W. F. Banbury =

American football player and coach (1879–1975)

Biographical details
- Born: June 30, 1879; Danville, Ohio, U.S.
- Died: April 9, 1975 (aged 95); Pratt, Kansas, U.S.

Playing career
- 1901–1904: Bethany (KS)
- 1905–1907: Western U. of Pennsylvania
- Positions: Fullback, halfback

Coaching career (HC unless noted)
- 1917–1919: Bethany (KS)

Head coaching record
- Overall: 5–15–2

Winfred Foster "Wynn" Banbury (June 30, 1879 – April 9, 1975) was an American college football player and coach. He served as the head football coach at Bethany College, in Lindsborg, Kansas, from 1917 to 1919.

Banbury attended Bethany College, where he played football as a fullback and halfback from 1901 to 1904, and was team captain in 1904. After graduating from Bethany, he went to the University of Pittsburgh School of Dental Medicine. At Pittsburgh, he again played football. He later practiced as a dentist in Pratt, Kansas, where he was raised. Banbury played football at both Bethany and Pittsburgh alongside his brother, Quince Banbury.

== Head coaching record ==
Year	Team	Overall	Conference	Standing	Bowl/playoffs
Bethany Swedes (Kansas Collegiate Athletic Conference) (1917–1919)
1917	Bethany	3–7	3–6	T–10th	
1918	Bethany	0–3–1			
1919	Bethany	2–5–1	2–5–1	10th	
Bethany:		5–15–2			
Total:		5–15–2			
