= Quince Banbury =

American football player and coach (1883–1956)

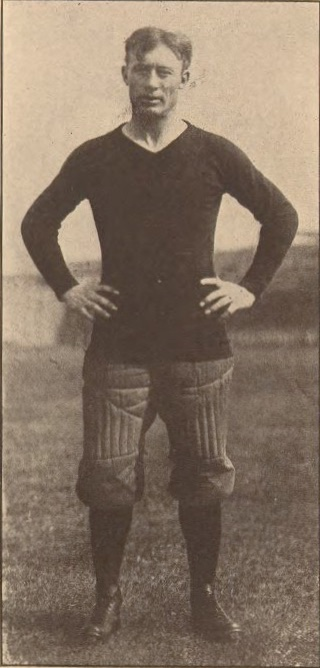

Biographical details
- Born: August 29, 1883; Danville, Ohio, U.S.
- Died: January 19, 1956 (aged 72); Wichita, Kansas, U.S.

Playing career

Football
- 1901–1904: Bethany (KS)
- 1905–1908: Western U. of Pennsylvania / Pittsburg

Track and field
- c. 1905–1908: Western U. of Pennsylvania / Pittsburg
- Position: Quarterback (football)

Coaching career (HC unless noted)

Football
- 1912–1917: Friends
- 1918: Fairmount
- 1919–1923: Friends
- 1926–1931: Friends

Track and field
- c. 1912–1930: Friends

Accomplishments and honors

Championships
- Football; 2 KCAC (1914, 1920)

John Quincy "Quince" Banbury (August 29, 1883 – January 19, 1956) was an American college football player and coach, track and field athlete and coach, and dentist.

== Playing career ==
Banbury played for the University of Pittsburgh and was captain of the team in 1908. He also was on the track and field team and competed in the long jump. A native of Pratt, Kansas, Banbury played football at both Bethany and Pittsburgh alongside his brother, W. F. Banbury.

== Coaching career ==
In 1912, Banbury was appointed coach of the football team at Friends University in Wichita, Kansas. In 1918, when Friends was unable to field a football team, he coached football at Fairmount College—now known as Wichita State University. Banbury returned to Friends in 1919. He also coached the track team at Friends.

== Later life and death ==
Banbury practiced as dentist in Wichita for 43 years. He died on January 19, 1956, at St. Francis Hospital in Wichita.

== Head coaching record ==
=== Football ===
Year	Team	Overall	Conference	Standing	Bowl/playoffs
Friends Quakers (Kansas Collegiate Athletic Conference) (1912–1917)
1912	Friends				
1913	Friends		3–2	T–5th	
1914	Friends	9–0	8–0	1st	
1915	Friends	5–3	4–1	4th	
1916	Friends	3–4–2	3–2–2	8th	
1917	Friends	3–5–1	3–3–1	T–7th	
Fairmount Wheatshockers (Kansas Collegiate Athletic Conference) (1918)
1918	Fairmount	1–4			
Fairmount:		1–4			
Friends Quakers (Kansas Collegiate Athletic Conference) (1919–1923)
1919	Friends	4–5	3–4	T–7th	
1920	Friends	7–1	7–1	1st	
1921	Friends	3–4–1	3–3–1	T–8th	
1922	Friends	5–2	5–2	T–4th	
1923	Friends	5–2	5–1	T–2nd	
Friends Quakers (Kansas Collegiate Athletic Conference) (1926–1928)
1926	Friends	4–2–1	4–2	6th	
1927	Friends	2–6	1–6	T–13th	
1928	Friends	3–6	3–4	7th	
Friends Quakers (Independent) (1929–1931)
1929	Friends	4–3–1			
1930	Friends	2–5–1			
1931	Friends	4–3–1			
Friends:					
Total:					
National championship Conference title Conference division title or championship game berth
