= Şehzade =

Ottoman title, equivalent to prince

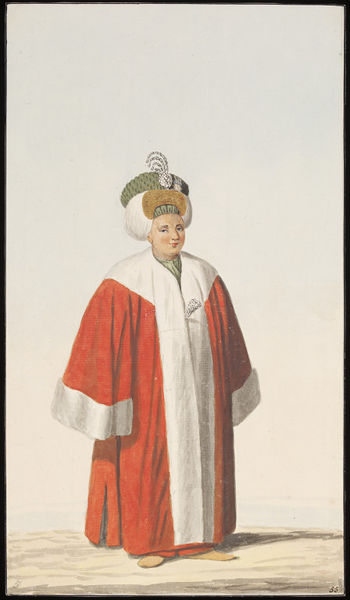
Costume of a Şehzade

Şehzade (Persian/Ottoman Turkish: شهزاده) is the Ottoman form of the Persian title Shahzadeh, and refers to the male descendants of an Ottoman sovereign. This title is equivalent to "prince of the blood imperial" in English.

== Origin ==
Şehzade derives from the Persian word shahzadeh or shahzada. In the realm of a shah (or shahanshah), a prince or princess of the blood was logically called shahzada, the term being derived from "shah" using the Persian patronymic suffix -zādeh or -zada, meaning "son of", "daughter of", "descendant of", or "born of". However, the precise full styles can differ in the court traditions of each monarchy.

== Usage in Ottoman royalty ==
In Ottoman royalty, the title şehzade designates male descendants of sovereigns in the male line. In formal address, this title is used with title sultan before a given name, reflecting the Ottoman conception of sovereign power as a family prerogative. Only a şehzade had the right to succeed to the throne. Before the reign of Murad II (1421-1444 and 1446–1451), sons of sultans used the title Çelebi after their name.

The formal way of addressing a şehzade is Devletlû Najabatlu Şehzade Sultan (given name) Hazretleri Efendi, i.e., Sultan Imperial Prince (given name) or simply Imperial Prince (given name). The style of consorts of şehzades is hanımefendi. Sons of şehzades also carried the same title as their fathers, and daughters of şehzades hold the title sultan after their name. The Osmanoğlu family continues to use these titles.

=== Ottoman Crown Prince ===
A designated crown prince used the title of Valiahad or Veliahd (Ottoman Turkish: ولی عہد), meaning "the successor by virtue of a covenant", and the full style of Devletlû Najabatlu Valiahd-i Saltanat Şehzade-i Javanbahd (given name) Efendi Hazretleri. The title for consorts of crown princes was "Vali Ahad Zevcesi", with the full style of Veliahd Zevcesi (given name) (rank) Hanımefendi Hazretleri.

== Education ==
The education of princes has been of great importance throughout the Ottoman period since its foundation. The main reason was that the prince who ascends the throne and becomes the sultan will take over the administration of the country. However, these training courses have undergone various changes over time. The periods in which the education of the princes underwent changes can be divided into four parts. These;

- Change due to Kafes system,
- Change due the lattice system to the mid-19th century,
- Change due the mid-19th century to the proclamation of the Second Constitutional Monarchy,
- Change after the proclamation of the Second Constitutional Monarchy.

Until the Second Constitutional Monarchy declared in the early 19th century, princes began their early education in palaces. Dâye and Lalas who were responsible for the education of the princes. Although the princes who started the school took a wide variety of courses, they were mainly trained in reading, writing, the Koran and basic religious education. These education, which lasted until the age of 11 or 15, also included practical lessons such as fighting and horse riding.

After the theoretical and basic education received until the age of 11 or 15, şehzades were sent to the sanjaks (provinces) for practical training until their turn to rule came. The period of sending to sanjaks for this practical training ended with Ahmed I, being Mehmed III the last Ottoman Sultan to be sent to a province as governor. After this period the system known as the Kafe system came into effect. Under this system, princes who completed their education up to the age of ten began to live in the sections reserved for them in apartments called Şimşirlik in palaces. However, under 15s are found in Topkapı Palace. They lived under the care of little girls called "Dâye". After the age of 15, they were placed in their own departments. Now they could never have left their post here in the palace. Their education continued without interruption and in a very rigorous manner, accompanied by teachers. The princes were forced to live in the palace sections for many years as a sort of prison life. Because they had almost no contact with anyone except servants (concubines) and their mothers. This caused some symptoms of madness such as Mustafa I and Ibrahim.

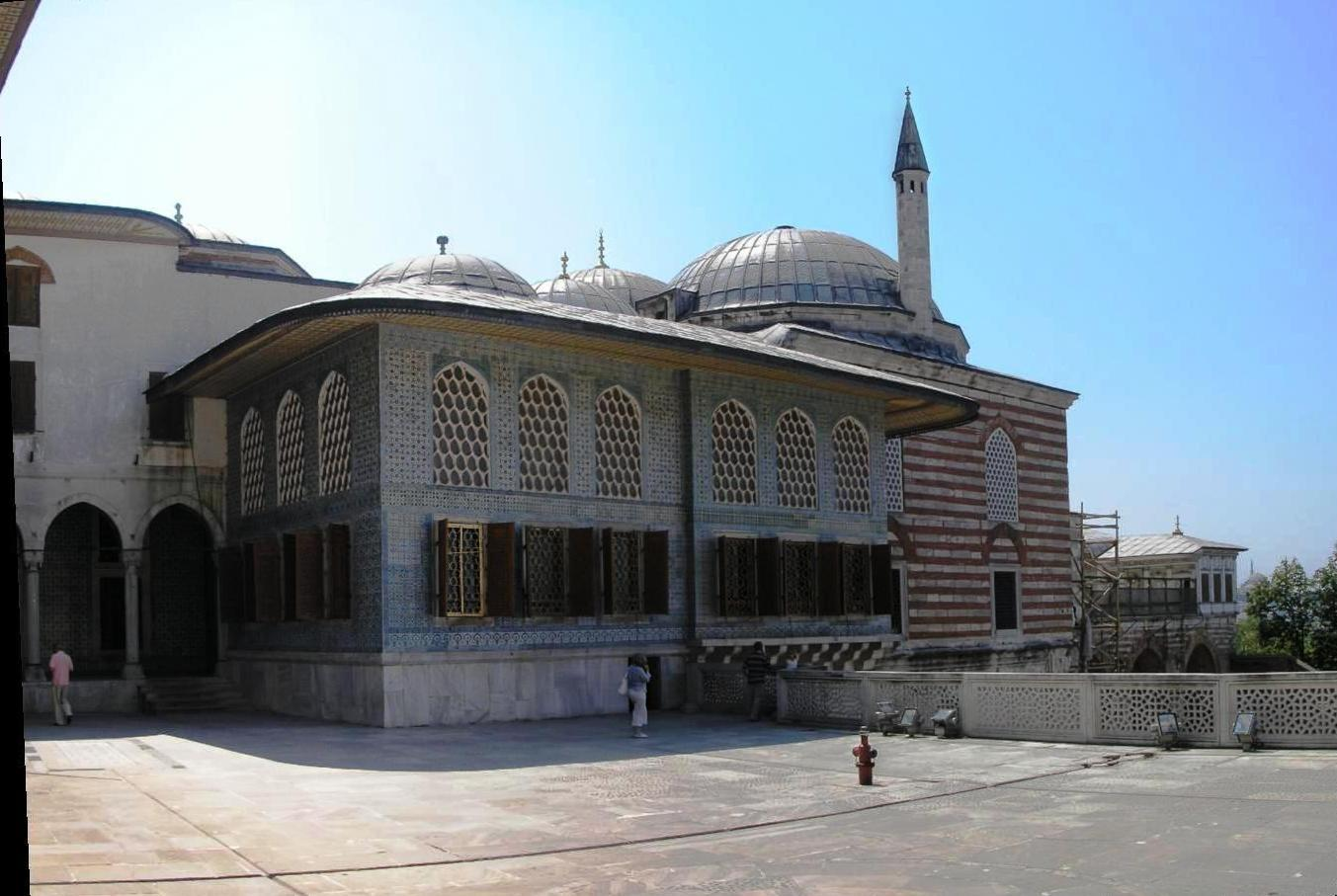
The apartments of the Crown Prince in the Topkapı Palace, which was also called kafes

The princes, who did not participate in any state ceremonies or celebrations until 1839, were only allowed to participate in a few ceremonies and celebrations during Abdülmecid's reign between 1839 and 1861. This period is already a time when the kafe system softens and begins to deteriorate. Also, there were changes in the education of the princes during this period, and Western culture became one of the educations given. Also, in this period, while the members of the dynasty and the children of the notables of the Ottoman state were educated at the Şehzadegân Mektebi (Mekteb-i Âli) school, the princes began to receive an education later. Foreign teachers could also teach in this school. However, most of the teachers were chosen by the soldiers. In subsequent years, the sultan Abdülhamid II wanted his children to get more attention and better education in this school. He did not show the care and attention he gave to his children's education in the education of the other boys in the dynasty. For this reason the educational level of the children of the other members of the dynasty was quite low in these years. With the declaration of the Second Constitutional Monarchy in 1908, this school was closed Abdülhamid's dethronement in 1909 also changed the education and other conditions of the princes. Now the princes were freed from being indoors.

In 1913, the "Regulations determining the status and positions of members of the dynasty" came into force for the education of princes. According to this regulation, the princes would learn to read and write a foreign language after having had a perfect education in Turkish and Arabic. Furthermore, with the Nizamnâme, the education of princes assumed an institutional structure. The final decision on the prince's education was made on February 7, 1922, with the "Hanedân-ı Saltanat Decree". With this Decree a clearer picture was drawn of the education imparted to the princes.

== Struggle for the throne and fratricide ==
Before the implementation of the cage system (Kafes), in which the practice of being sent to the sanjak was abolished, the princes previously assumed military duties and had improved themselves in this respect. However, after the death of Suleiman I in 1566, the princes could not actually take part in the army and could not participate in wars. This period continued until the reign of Abdülmecid in 1839. However, after this period, although the princes lived a freer life, they did not participate largely in state administration or in the military. Subsequently, some princes took part in some state functions. The most important reason why princes fight for the throne is that there is no system of succession to ascend the throne. In other words, every prince has the right to become a sultan. However, this order changed during the reign of Murad I. Murad left the sultanate only to the sultan and his sons. In this case, he occasionally brought major fights to the throne. This was sanctioned by Mehmed the Conqueror who considered this practice essential for the good of the world.

Thus it was that the state administration was transformed into a highly centralized structure, making the sultan an "absolute ruler". In some contemporary sources, this event is referred to as "the legalization of fratricide". In this period the princes were often victims of massacres (such as when Mehmed III ascended the throne) and struggles for the throne (such as between Selim I and his brother Şehzade Ahmed or Selim II and Şehzade Bayezid).

Only later, during the reign of Ahmed I, the modification of the pattern of succession to the throne from a system of primogeniture to one based on agnatic seniority made the hereditary system stricter and clearer.

== Feminine equivalent ==
There is no feminine equivalent of şehzade or a special title for princesses in Ottoman royalty. In Persian, shahzade is used for both male and female descendants of a monarch. The royalty of the Indian Mughal Empire used the title shahzada for princes and the feminine equivalent of this title, shahzadi, for princesses. In the Ottoman Empire two titles were used to refer to Ottoman princesses. Hatun was used before 16th century and this style also used for female imperial consort and noblewomen. Sultan used after their name after 1481 with the accession of Bayezid II to the throne and this title also used for the main imperial family.

== Example of imperial princes (şehzade) ==
- Şehzade Mustafa (1515–1553), son of Suleiman the Magnificent. His story was very popular, especially rumors of his execution in 1553. In 1561, eight years after Mustafa's death, the French author Gabriel Bounin wrote a tragedy titled La Soltane about the role of Hürrem Sultan in Mustafa's death. This tragedy marks the first time the Ottomans were introduced on stage in France.
- Şehzade Yahya (1585–1649), son of Murad III. He was baptized at an Orthodox Christian monastery and gained support for his claim to the throne from his nephew, Ahmed I.
- Abdülmecid II (29 May 1868 – 23 August 1944), son of Abdülaziz. He was the only şehzade to hold the title of caliph; Ottoman caliphs before Abdülmecid only obtained the title of caliph when they became emperor.
- Bayezid Osman (23 June 1924 - 6 January 2017), second son of Sultan Abdülmecid I's grandson Ibrahim Tevfik. He was the 44th Head of the Imperial House of Osman from 23 September 2009 to 6 January 2017.

== See also ==
- List of Ottoman titles and appellations
- List of sultans of the Ottoman Empire
- List of Ottoman princesses
- Şehzade Mosque
