= Mehmed V =

Sultan of the Ottoman Empire from 1909 to 1918

- Custodian of the Two Holy Mosques; Khan
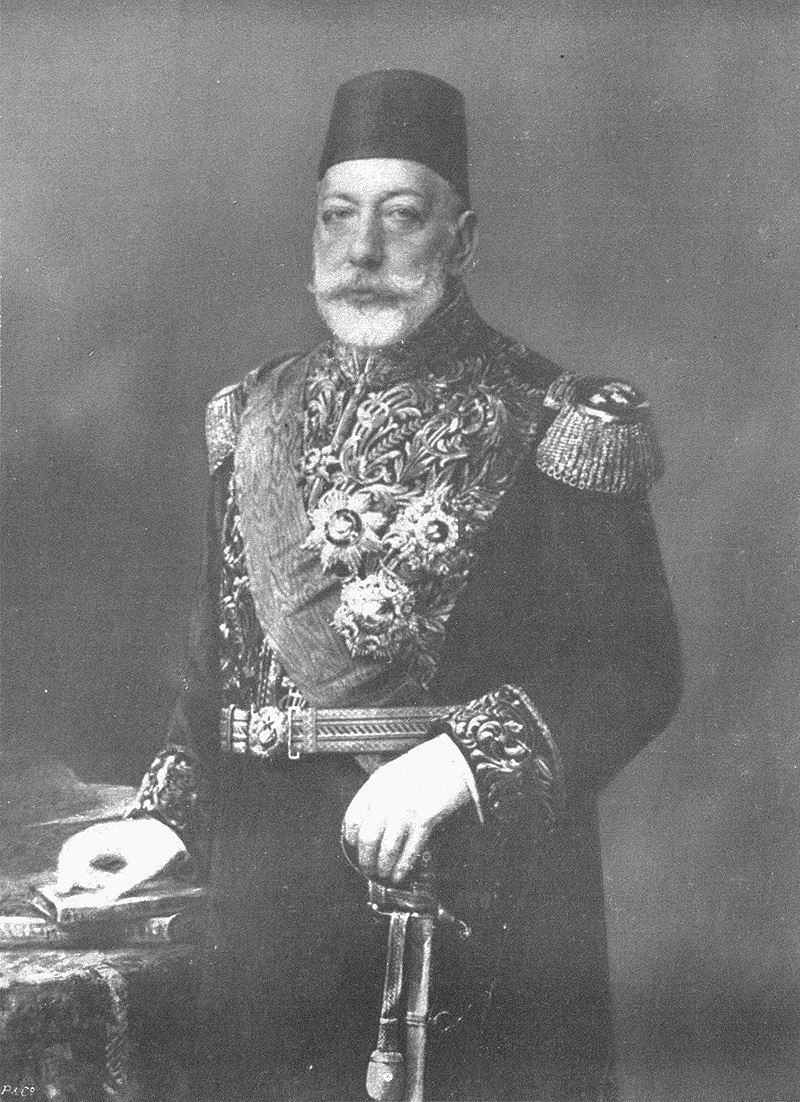
- Formal portrait, 1915

Sultan of the Ottoman Empire (Padishah)
- Reign: 27 April 1909 – 3 July 1918
- Predecessor: Abdul Hamid II
- Successor: Mehmed VI
- Grand Viziers: See list: Ahmet Tevfik Pasha Hüseyin Hilmi Pasha Ibrahim Hakki Pasha Mehmed Said Pasha Ahmed Muhtar Pasha Mehmed Kâmil Pasha Mahmud Shevket Pasha Said Halim Pasha Mehmed Talat Pasha

Ottoman caliph (Amir al-Mu'minin)
- Predecessor: Abdul Hamid II
- Successor: Mehmed VI
- Born: 2 November 1844; Çırağan Palace, Constantinople, Ottoman Empire
- Died: 3 July 1918 (aged 73); Yıldız Palace, Constantinople, Ottoman Empire
- Burial: Tomb of Sultan Mehmed V Reşad, Eyüp, Istanbul
- Consorts: Kamures Kadın; Dürriaden Kadın; Mihrengiz Kadın; Nazperver Kadın; Dilfirib Kadın
- Issue: Şehzade Mehmed Ziyaeddin; Şehzade Mahmud Necmeddin; Şehzade Ömer Hilmi; Refia Sultan
Names
- Mehmed Han bin Abdülmecid
- Dynasty: Ottoman
- Father: Abdulmejid I
- Mother: Gülcemal Kadın (biological mother); Servetseza Kadın (adoptive mother)
- Religion: Sunni Islam
- Tughra

Mehmed V Reşâd (Ottoman Turkish: محمد خامس, romanized: Meḥmed-i ḫâmis; Turkish: V. Mehmed or Mehmed Reşad; 2 November 1844 – 3 July 1918) was the penultimate sultan of the Ottoman Empire from 1909 to 1918. Mehmed V reigned as a constitutional monarch. He had little influence over government affairs and his ministries showed little regard for the constitution. The first half of his reign was marked by increasingly polarizing politics, and the second half by war and domination of the Committee of Union and Progress (CUP) and the Three Pashas.

Reşad was the son of Sultan Abdul Mejid I. He was sympathetic to the Young Turks, and while Crown Prince was kept under house arrest by his reigning half-brother Abdul Hamid II. Reşad was elevated to the throne at his expense in the aftermath of the 31 March Incident, taking the regal name Mehmed V. Coming to power in the aftermath of the failed coup attempt, his nine-year reign featured three coups d'etat, four wars, eleven governments, and numerous uprisings. The Italo-Turkish War saw the cession of the Empire's North African territories and the Dodecanese Islands, including Rhodes, during which the CUP was forced out of power by the military. This was followed by the traumatic loss of Turkey's European territories west of Constantinople (now Istanbul) in the First Balkan War, and the return of a now radicalized CUP rule in another coup. Eastern Thrace was retaken in the Second Balkan War.

Turkey entered World War I in November 1914, upon which Mehmed declared a jihad against the Allies. In 1915, Turkish forces successfully fended off an Allied invasion at Gallipoli and captured a large British garrison at Kut. During that year, the CUP initiated the Armenian genocide against the Sultan's wishes, though his private disapproval of his government's actions was inconsequential. By Mehmed V's death on 3 July 1918, defeat loomed on the Palestinian and Macedonian fronts. With military collapse in the field and the Arab Revolt spelling impending disaster, the Turks signed the Armistice of Mudros during the reign of his successor Mehmed VI.

== Early life ==
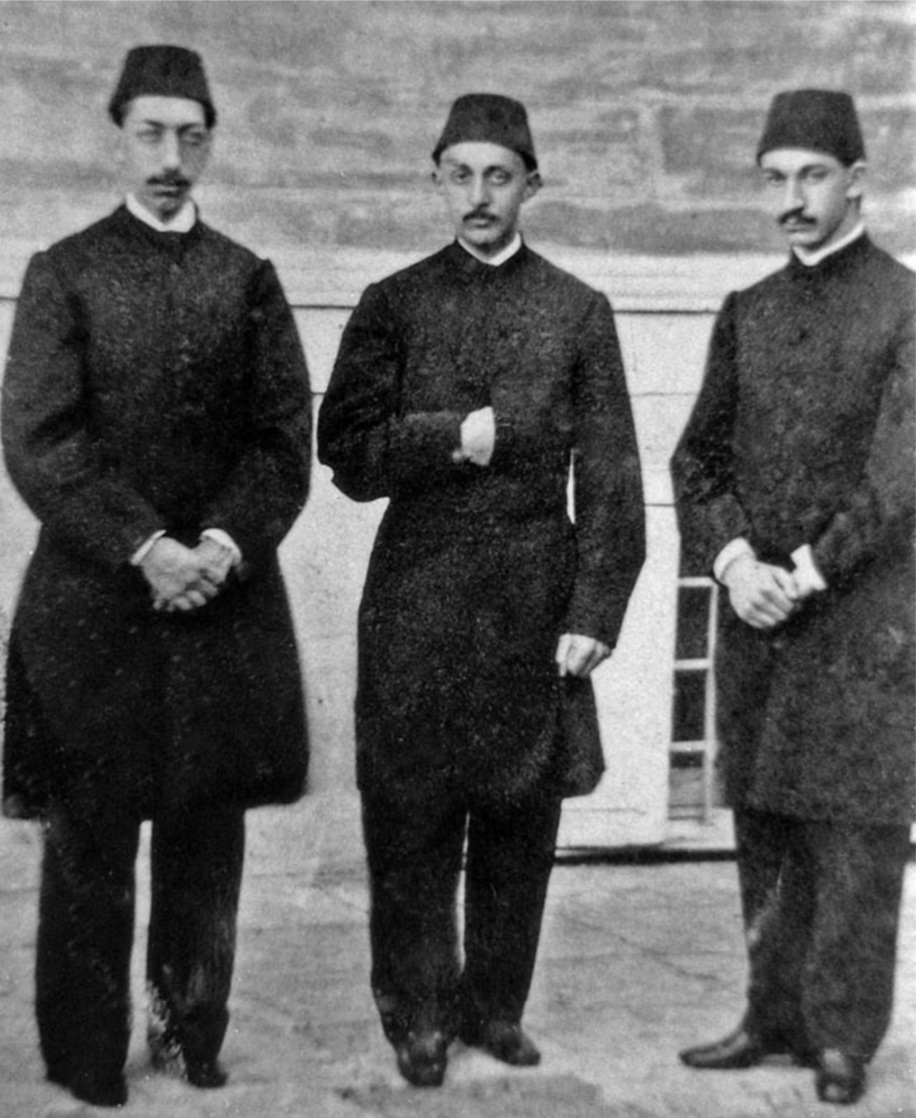
Princes Reşad, Murad, and Kemaleddin

Şehzade Mehmed Reşad was born on 2 November 1844, at the Çırağan Palace, Constantinople. His father was Sultan Abdulmejid I, and his mother was Gülcemal Kadın. He had three elder sisters, Fatma Sultan, Refia Sultan and Hatice Sultan (Refia Sultan's twin sister, died in infancy). After his mother's death in 1851, he and his sisters were entrusted to the care of his father's senior consort Servetseza Kadın. Abdulmejid allowed her to take motherless children under her wing, whom she raised as her own.

In 1856, aged twelve, he was ceremoniously circumcised together with his younger half-brothers, Şehzade Ahmed Kemaleddin, Şehzade Mehmed Burhaneddin, and Şehzade Ahmed Nureddin.

Şehzade Reşad received his education at the palace. Halid Ziya, the chief clerk of the Chamberlain's office between 1909 and 1912, described this as being a poor one. Thanks to his comparatively high intelligence, however, he made good use of the education he had. He studied Arabic and Persian, and spoke the latter very well. He took piano lessons from an Italian pianist and calligraphy lessons from a famous Ottoman calligrapher, Kazasker Mustafa Izzet Efendi, who designed the giant pendant medallions of the Hagia Sophia. In addition to Persian literature, Reşad was also interested in Mevlevi Sufism and the Masnavi.

He enjoyed the company of his uncle Abdul Aziz. Reşad became crown-prince in 1876 with the ascension of his half-brother Sultan Abdul Hamid II, but was essentially kept under house arrest in Dolmabahçe Palace under close surveillance. For a variety of reasons, especially superstitious ones, Abdul Hamid abhorred his half-brother. It was said that Abdul Hamid was afraid of the evil eye of his brother and that he had sacrifices made, held prayers, and incense burned immediately after he left the palace when he came to congratulate him on holidays. He was even heard to say, "I am doing my brother a great favor by not showing myself to the public," out of concern that his half-brother might be indiscreet. The belief in his bad luck began when he learned a favorite mare of his died hours after taking a walk around the palace stables with Prince Reşad. Abdul Hamid did have grounded reasons to be suspicious of Reşad, who maintained a correspondence with exiled Young Turks.

After the lifting of many restrictions in the aftermath of the Young Turk Revolution Reşad earned popularity as crown prince by attending ceremonies that celebrated the constitution, much to the chagrin of his previously absolutist half-brother.

== Reign ==
His reign began at the conclusion of the 31 March Incident on 27 April 1909, which resulted in the deposition of his half-brother Abdul Hamid II. Reşad came to the throne largely as a figurehead with no real political power. At the age of 65, Reşad was the oldest person to ascend the Ottoman throne. It was decided to use the name "Mehmed" as his regal name, not his more distinct name "Reşad". This was upon the suggestion of Ferik Sami Pasha, to establish a connection between Mehmed the Conqueror's entry into Constantinople with his army and Prince Mehmed Reşad's accession to the Sultanate upon the arrival of the Action Army to Istanbul. Although he ascended to the throne with the title of Mehmed V, he was called Sultan Reşad by the people.

Because of his house imprisonment, Reşad sat on the throne at the age of 65 and with no experience in state affairs. His time as a Şehzade was sheltered because of his bad relationship with his now deposed half-brother. Due to his meek, weak-willed, and naïve personality and the strength of the Committee of Union and Progress, the government was firmly out of his hands. When the CUP asked something from him he would immediately acquiesce without push back, typically replying "I am pleased!" or "I am humbled!" The Sultan was incredibly afraid of the men of action of the CUP, and the possibility he could end up like one of his predecessors: His uncle Abdul Aziz was deposed and died in suspicious circumstances, his half-brother Murad V was deposed by the Young Ottomans after suffering a nervous breakdown and held in house arrest for the rest of his life, and Abdul Hamid was now deposed (and held in house arrest in Salonika) after his palace and harem was ransacked.

The sultan complained to one of the few companions he had: Elif Efendi, Sheikh of the Sütlüce Sadi Sufi Order, of the situation he was in. “Everyone complains that I do not interfere in anything, and that I do not even use the rights given to me by the Constitution. However, if I did not do this, these guys [the Unionists] would send me to Konya and declare a republic. I am doing this for the survival of the sultanate that was the legacy of my ancestors.” When the sultan was asked to take a more proactive approach to politics as the CUP stirred up trouble, Reşad responded "Everyone tells me not to interfere in business. What was my brother’s crime if I interfered with the Constitutional Monarchy?"

=== Enthronement and sword girding ===
His Cülûs [Coronation] ceremony was held in the Ministry of War building (now part of Istanbul University) in Beyazıt. The new sultan boarded the İhsaniye from Dolmabahçe Palace to Sirkeci, during which he received a gun salute that frightened him. As he was leaving Sirkeci to Beyazıt in the royal carriage, the people of Istanbul lined up on both sides of the road and enthusiastically applauded as he passed by. In his speech after the bay'ah prayer, he declared, "I am the first sultan of liberty and I am proud of it!" and from then on Mehmed V was known as the "Constitutional Sultan." On May 10, 1909, the sultan boarded the yacht Söğütlü in front of Dolmabahçe, and was received in the Eyüp Sultan Mosque Complex by the Shaykh al-Islam Saygı Efendi and Postnişini Abdülhalim Efendi of the Mevlevi Order, and was girded with the sword of Osman. Sultan Reşad then boarded the royal carriage and visited the tomb of Mehmed the Conqueror in the Fatih Mosque, after which he returned to the Dolmabahçe. Since the sultan was not seen on the streets of Istanbul during the long years of Abdul Hamid's reign, the new sultan's carriage trip around the city, during which he cheerfully greeted his subjects, created great excitement among the people of Istanbul.

=== First years ===
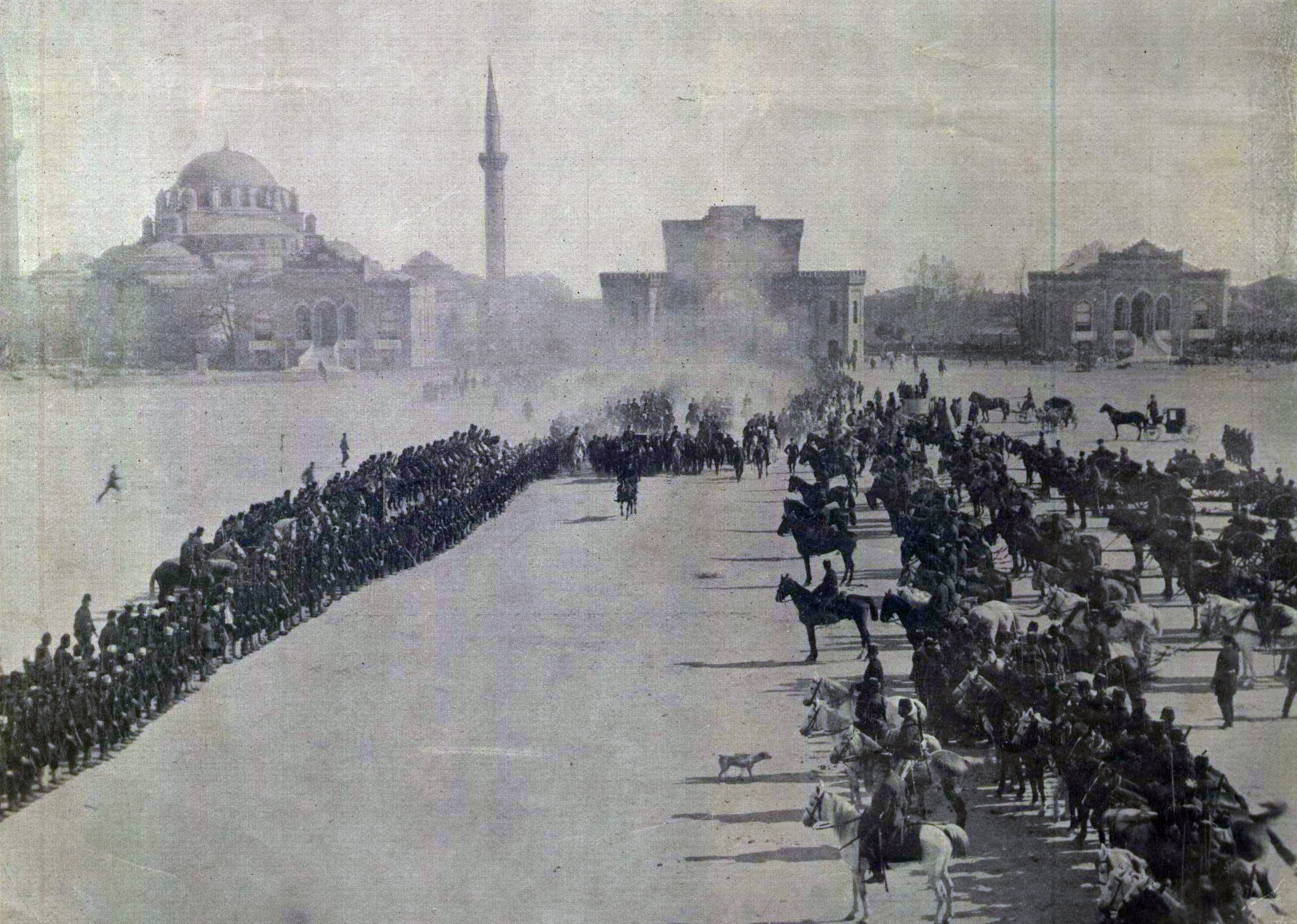
Padişah Reşad's Cülûs ceremony

Despite its shaky foundations, the constitution was promulgated for the third and final time when Reşad ascended to the throne (it was retracted during the 1878 and 1909 crisis). However the issue about what to with the 31 March perpetrators revealed who was really in power: Mahmud Şevket Pasha and the CUP. In the immediate aftermath of the 31 March Incident, Sultan Reşad persistently informed the members of the Chamber of Deputies that he would not approve the executions of common criminals and especially political criminals associated with the 31 March uprising. Afterwards, he wasn't able to resist the insistence of the Unionist politicians, and eventually approved their hanging. This was the first of many examples of Sultan Reşad's reluctant approval of many laws, decrees and wills during his reign against his personal convictions and the constitution, and he soon developed a disinterest in statecraft.

On May 5, 1909, Ahmed Tevfik Pasha, Abdul Hamid II's last grand vizier who was appointed in the middle of the 31 March Crisis, resigned under the pressure from the CUP, and a new government more favorable to the committee was formed under the grand viziership of Hüseyin Hilmi Pasha.

Right after ascending the throne, he made an imperial tour of Bursa, to demonstrate the monarchy's new openness to the people. His entourage also included the Crown Prince Yusuf İzzeddin, Şehzade Mehmed Vahdeddin, Grand Vizier Hüseyin Hilmi, Minister of the Navy Arif Hikmet Pasha and the official historian of the state Abdurrahman Şeref Efendi. He embarked on another imperial tour of Edirne in 1910, with Prince Vahdeddin, Grand Vizier İbrahim Hakkı Pasha, Foreign Minister Rıfat Pasha, and Interior minister Talât Pasha.

The Albanian Revolt of 1910 broke out and was suppressed by Şevket Pasha, now War Minister. The assassination of Ahmet Samim Bey and the Western-sponsored integration of the Cretan State into Greece threw the sultan into a fit of depression.

In June 1911, he embarked on an imperial tour of Selânik (Salonica, today Thessaloniki) and Manastır (today Bitola), stopping by Florina on the way. He also visited Üsküp (Skopje) and Priştine (Pristina), where he attended Friday prayers at the Tomb of Sultan Murad. The visit was recorded on film and photographs by the Manaki brothers. It would soon prove to be the last visit of an Ottoman sultan to the Rumelian provinces before the catastrophe of the Balkan Wars the following year.

In the backdrop of the 1912 Albanian revolt and the Italian invasion of Libya, due to the CUP's policies of centralization and Turkish nationalism, the 1912 elections were mainly a contest between the CUP and the new Freedom and Accord Party. With the CUP rigging the proceedings to their advantage, the military decided to dispute the results. The Savior Officers demanded the pro-CUP Grand Vizier Mehmed Said Pasha dissolve parliament and to resign, which he did. Reşad appointed Ahmed Muhtar Pasha in his place, who formed a national unity government called the Great Cabinet. Martial law was declared. With defeat in the Balkan Wars, Muhtar Pasha resigned, and was replaced by Kâmil Pasha.

=== War ===
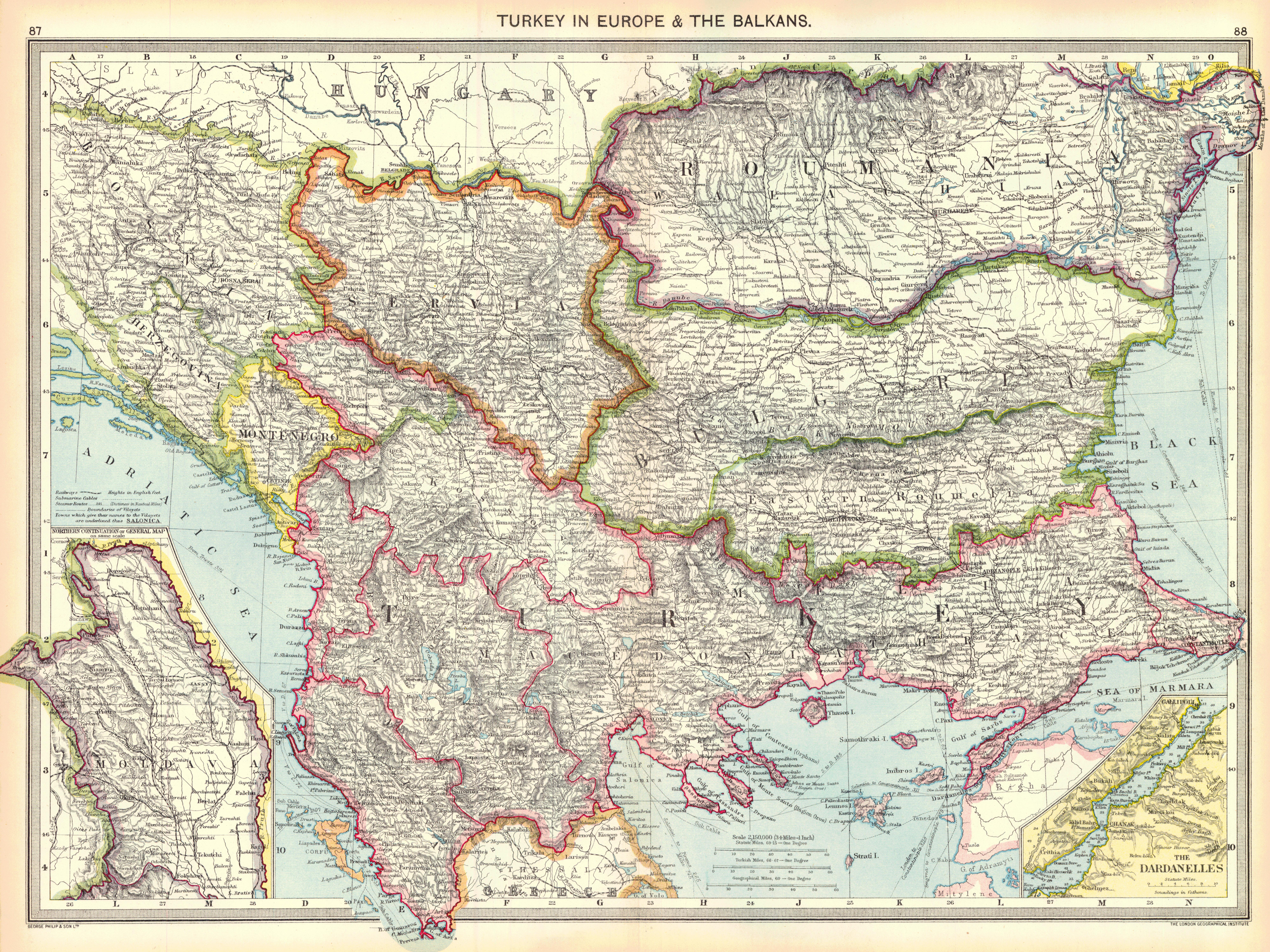
Map of the Ottoman territories in Europe in 1910, prior to the Balkan Wars (1912–1913)

Under his rule, the Ottoman Empire lost all its remaining territory in North Africa (Tripolitania, Cyrenaica and Fezzan) and the Dodecanese to Italy in the Italo-Turkish War and nearly all its European territories (except for a small strip of land west of Constantinople) in the First Balkan War. The Ottomans made some small gains in the following Second Balkan War, recapturing the peninsula comprising East Thrace up to Edirne, but this was only partial consolation for the Turks: the bulk of Ottoman territories that they had fought to keep had been lost forever.

The sudden loss of these enormous swaths of land, which had been Ottoman territory for centuries and were ceded to the Empire's opponents within a span of only two years, was traumatic to the Turks. The CUP organized the 1913 coup d'état, where a party of ~50 Unionists led by Enver and Talât raided the Sublime Porte, and Enver famously demanded Kâmil resign at gunpoint. Upon the Sultan hearing of the news he said "Peki o halde... Hayırlı olsun" ("Well in that case... good luck [to them]").

Muslims in the lost lands were expelled from their homes and emigrated behind the new Ottoman border surrounding Constantinople. The resulting refugee crisis overwhelmed municipal authorities. It also spelt the end of the Ottomanism movement, which for several decades had advocated equal rights to all citizens of the Empire regardless of ethnicity or religion, in order to foster a communal sense of belonging and allegiance to the Ottoman state. With the loss of the Empire's ethnic minorities in Rumelia and North Africa, the movement's raison d'être also evaporated, and the country's politics soon began to take on a more exclusionary character, centered around Turkish nationalism. The more extreme elements of a right-wing faction, primarily in the upper echelons of the CUP-dominated government, would go on to commit genocide against the Armenians.

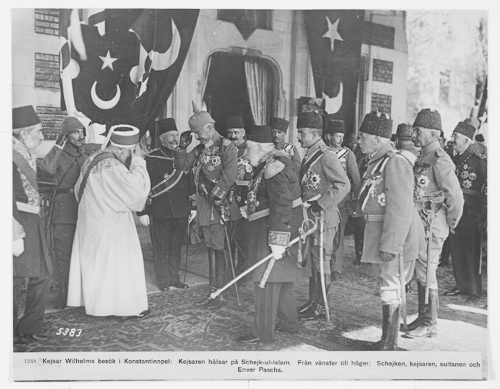
Sultan Mehmed V, Enver Pasha, Grand Vizier Talât Pasha, and future Sultan Mehmed VI, hosting Wilhelm II in Constantinople during World War I.

After the assassination of Mahmud Şevket Pasha, it was discovered a member of the royal family was involved in the plot. Şehzade Kemaleddin's daughter Münire Sultan married Grand Vizier Tunuslu Hayreddin Pasha's son: Salih Pasha. Sultan Reşad had no qualms with signing the death sentence of one of his brothers’ damats. It is alleged that the Committee of Union and Progress upper echelon knew he wasn't involved in the plot but pushed for his execution to eliminate a political rival. Salih Pasha was tried and sentenced to death, and when Sultan Reşad signed the sentence, he was executed by hanging. Mehmed V is said to have sanctioned the execution under duress- Cemal Pasha is said to have threatened the sultan, saying, “If you do not sign this, we will dethrone you too." Münire Sultan cursed her uncle Sultan Reşad, who had authorized her husband’s execution, saying “God willing, his beard will be stained with blood!”, the grey-haired sovereign defended himself by saying “What could I do? Enver put his gun to my head, I signed it” and tried to compensate for his cognitive dissonance by snapping the pen which he signed the decision. After this incident, Reşad is said to have been terrified of being dethroned and simply approved everything the Unionists demanded from him.

Despite his preference that the country stayed out of further conflict, Sultan Reşad's most significant political act was to formally declare a jihad against the Entente Powers on 14 November 1914, following the Ottoman government's decision to join the First World War on the side of the Central Powers. He was actually said to look with disfavour on the pro-German policy of Enver Pasha, but could do little to prevent war due to the sultanate's diminished influence. This was the last genuine proclamation of jihad in history by a Caliph, as the Caliphate was abolished in 1924. As a direct result of the declaration of war, the British annexed Cyprus, while the Khedivate of Egypt proclaimed its independence and was turned into a British protectorate; these provinces had at least been under nominal Ottoman rule. The proclamation had no noticeable effect on the war, despite the fact that many Muslims lived in Ottoman territories. Some Arabs eventually joined the British forces against the Ottoman Empire with the Arab Revolt in 1916.

Reşad hosted Kaiser Wilhelm II, his World War I ally, in Constantinople on 15 October 1917. He was made Generalfeldmarschall of the Kingdom of Prussia on 27 January 1916, and of the German Empire on 1 February 1916. He was also made a Feldmarschall of Austria-Hungary on 19 May 1918.

== Death ==
Reşad died at Yıldız Palace on 3 July 1918 at the age of 73, only four months before the end of World War I. Thus, he did not live to see the downfall of the Ottoman Empire. He spent most of his life at the Dolmabahçe Palace and Yıldız Palace in Constantinople. His grave is in the Eyüp district of modern Istanbul. He was succeeded by his brother Mehmed Vahideddin, who took the regal name Mehmed VI.

== Honours ==
Ottoman honours

- Grand Master of the Order of the Crescent
- Grand Master of the Order of Distinction
- Grand Master of the Order of Glory
- Grand Master of the Order of the Medjidie
- Grand Master of the Order of Osmanieh

Foreign honours

- Austria-Hungary: Order of Saint Stephen of Hungary, Grand Cross with Diamonds (1914)
- Kingdom of Bavaria: Military Order of Max Joseph, Grand Cross (2 February 1916)
- Kingdom of Serbia: Order of the Star of Karađorđe, Grand Cross

== Personal life ==
=== Personality ===
Sultan Reşad was known to all as someone full of graciousness and elegance, but little to show when it came to politics.

=== Family ===
Mehmed V had a small harem, as well as few children. He was also the only sultan not to take new consorts after his accession to the throne.

==== Consorts ====
Mehmed V had five consorts:

- Kamures Kadın (5 March 1855 – 30 April 1921). BaşKadin. She is also called Gamres, Kamres or Kamus. Of Caucasian descent, she married Mehmed when he was still Şehzade. She had a son.
- Dürriaden Kadın (16 May 1860 – 17 October 1909). Second Kadın. She born Hatice Hanim, she married Mehmed when he was still Şehzade. She was the aunt of Inşirah Hanim, who was a consort of Mehmed VI (Mehmed V's younger half-brother). She had a son.
- Mihrengiz Kadın (15 October 1869 – 12 December 1938). Second Kadın after Dürriaden's death. Circassian, born Fatma Hanım, married Mehmed when he was still Şehzade. She had a son.
- Nazperver Kadın (12 June 1870 – 9 March 1929). Third Kadın after Dürriaden's death. Born Rukiye Hanim, she was an Abkhazian princess of Çikotua family and niece of Dürrinev Kadın, chief consort of Sultan Abdülaziz, who educated her. She married Mehmed when he was still Şehzade. She had a daughter.
- Dilfirib Kadın (1890–1952). Fourth Kadın after Dürriaden's death. Circassian, she married Mehmed when he was still Şehzade. She was close friends with Safiye Ünüvar, a teacher at the Palace. She had no children by Mehmed, but after his death she remarried and had a son.

==== Children ====
Mehmed V had three sons:

- Şehzade Mehmed Ziyaeddin (26 August 1873 – 30 January 1938) – with Kamures Kadın. He had five consorts, two sons and six daughters.
- Şehzade Mahmud Necmeddin (23 June 1878 – 27 June 1913) – with Dürriaden Kadın. Born with kyphosis, he never married or had children.
- Şehzade Ömer Hilmi (2 March 1886 – 6 April 1935) – with Mihrengiz Kadın. He had five consorts, a son and a daughter. His great-granddaughter Ayşe Gülnev Osmanoğlu became an authoress of historical novels about the Ottoman dynasty.
- Mehmed V had only one daughter:
  - Refia Sultan (1888–1888) – with Nazperver Kadın. She died in infancy.

== Sources ==
- Bardakçı, Murat (1998). Şahbaba: Osmanoğulları'nın Son Hükümdarı Vahdettin'in Hayatı, Hatıraları ve Özel Mektupları. Pan Yayıncılık-İnkılâp Kitabevi. ISBN 9751024536.
- Brookes, Douglas Scott (2010). The Concubine, the Princess, and the Teacher: Voices from the Ottoman Harem. University of Texas Press. ISBN 978-0-292-78335-5.
- Brookes, Douglas S. (2020). On the Sultan's Service: Halid Ziya Uşaklıgil's Memoir of the Ottoman Palace, 1909–1912. Indiana University Press. ISBN 978-0-253-04553-9.
- Glencross, Matthew; Rowbotham, Judith, eds. (2018). Monarchies and the Great War. Springer. ISBN 978-3-319-89515-4.
- Uluçay, M. Çağatay (2011). Padişahların kadınları ve kızları. Ötüken. ISBN 978-9-754-37840-5.

Mehmed V House of Osman Born: 2 November 1844 Died: 3 July 1918
Regnal titles
Preceded by Abdul Hamid II	Sultan of the Ottoman Empire; 27 Apr 1909 – 3 Jul 1918	Succeeded by Mehmed VI
Sunni Islam titles
Preceded by Abdul Hamid II	Caliph of the Ottoman Caliphate; 27 Apr 1909 – 3 Jul 1918	Succeeded by Mehmed VI
