= Dürriaden Kadın =

Consort of Ottoman Sultan Mehmed V

- Born: Voçibe Hatice Hanim; 16 May 1860; Kars or Sochi
- Died: 17 October 1909 (aged 49); Validebağı Palace, Constantinople, Ottoman Empire (present day Istanbul, Turkey)
- Burial: Gülistu Kadın mausoleum, Fatih Mosque, Fatih, Istanbul
- Spouse: Mehmed V (m. 1876)
- Issue: Şehzade Mahmud Necmeddin
Names
- Turkish: Hatice Dürriaden Kadın; Ottoman Turkish: درعدن قادین
- House: Voçibe (by birth); Ottoman (by marriage)
- Father: Voçibe Mustafa Bey
- Religion: Sunni Islam

Dürriaden Kadın (Ottoman Turkish: درعدن قادین, "shining heaven"; born Hatice Hanım Voçibe; 16 May 1860 – 17 October 1909) was the second consort of Sultan Mehmed V of the Ottoman Empire.

== Life ==
Dürrüaden Kadın was born on 16 May 1860 in the Voçibe princely family, in the North Caucasus, in Kars or Sochi. Her father was Voçibe Mustafa Bey and her real name was Hatice Hanim. She was aunt of Inşirah Hanim, her brother Aziz Bey's daughter and consort of Mehmed VI.

She was sent to the Ottoman Palace at three years old and was raised there. She married the then Şehzade Mehmed Reşad on 10 October 1876 in the crown princes apartments (Valihad Mansion) located in the Ortaköy Palace. Mehmed was thirty two years old, while Dürrüaden was sixteen years old. She was his second consort. Two years after the marriage, on 23 June 1878, she gave birth to her only son Şehzade Mahmud Necmeddin. The child had kyphosis and was in poor health.

On 27 April 1909, after Mehmed's accession to the throne, she was given the title of "Second Kadın".

== Death ==
Stressed and weakened by concern for her son's health, Dürriaden contracted tuberculosis and was sent to solitary confinement. Dürrüaden died on 17 October 1909 in the Vadildebağı Palace at the age of forty-nine, and was buried in the mausoleum of Gülistü Kadın, Fatih Mosque, Fatih, Istanbul. After her death, her son sponsored a fountain in her name at Kuruçeşme. He outlived her by four years, dying in 1913.

== Issue ==
Name	Birth	Death	Notes
Şehzade Mahmud Necmeddin	23 June 1878	27 June 1913	unmarried, and without issue

== See also ==
- Kadın (title)
- Ottoman Imperial Harem
- List of consorts of the Ottoman sultans

== Sources ==
- Brookes, Douglas Scott (2010). The Concubine, the Princess, and the Teacher: Voices from the Ottoman Harem. University of Texas Press. ISBN 978-0-292-78335-5.
- Sakaoğlu, Necdet (2008). Bu mülkün kadın sultanları: Vâlide sultanlar, hâtunlar, hasekiler, kadınefendiler, sultanefendiler. Oğlak Yayıncılık. ISBN 978-9-753-29623-6.
- Uluçay, Mustafa Çağatay (2011). Padişahların kadınları ve kızları. Ankara: Ötüken. ISBN 978-9-754-37840-5.
