= Bayezid Osman =

Bayezid Osman Osmanoğlu

Head of the Osmanoğlu family
- Term: 23 September 2009 – 6 January 2017
- Predecessor: Şehzade Ertuğrul Osman
- Successor: Şehzade Dündar Ali Osman
- Born: 23 June 1924; Paris, France
- Died: 6 January 2017 (aged 92); New York City, United States
- House: Imperial House of Osman
- Father: Şehzade Ibrahim Tevfik
- Mother: Hatice Şadiye Hanım

Bayezid Osman, also known as Osman Bayezid Osmanoğlu with a surname as required by the Republic of Turkey, or known by the Ottoman imperial name as Şehzade (Prince) Bayezid Osman Efendi (Ottoman Turkish: بایزید عثمان; 23 June 1924 – 6 January 2017), was the 44th Head of the Imperial House of Osman, which ruled the Ottoman Empire from 1299 to 1922. The monarchy was abolished in 1922, with the modern Republic of Turkey replacing it.

== Biography ==
He was the second son of Sultan Abdulmejid I's grandson Ibrahim Tevfik (24 September 1874 – 31 December 1931) by his fourth consort Şadiye Hanım. She was the daughter of Çürüksulu Süleyman Bahri Pasha Tavdgiridze, a Georgian.

He was a member of one of the younger branches of the House of Osman. He was the first member of the House of Osman to be born in exile, and the first head to have been born after the dissolution of the Ottoman Empire.

He served in the US military and worked as a librarian. He lived in the United States and France.

He declared that he had no grudges towards the regime that exiled his family and that for a long time prevented him from even visiting Turkey, saying he was happy to have at least been conceived in his homeland. His only bitterness concerned the 24-hour limit given to exiled members to leave the country, which forced them to leave without material assets and later determined their precarious economic situation.

Osman never married and had no children. On 23 September 2009 with the death of Ertuğrul Osman, he succeeded to the head of the House of Osman. Osman's relative, Abdulhamid Kayıhan Osmanoğlu, announced on social media that Osman had died in New York on 6 January 2017, aged ninety-two.

== Ancestry ==
Ancestors of Bayezid Osman

16. Mahmud II
8. Abdulmejid I
17. Bezmiâlem Sultan
4. Şehzade Mehmed Burhaneddin
9. Nükhetsezâ Hanım
2. Şehzade Ibrahim Tevfik
5. Mestinaz Hanım
1. Bayezid Osman Osmanoğlu
24. Çürüksulu Süleyman Bey
12. Çürüksulu Ibrahim Arslan Bey
6. Admiral Mahmud Süleyman Bahri Pasha
3. Hatice Şadiye Hanım
7. Hadice Elmas Hanım

== See also ==
- Line of succession to the former Ottoman throne

Bayezid Osman House of Osman Born: 23 June 1924 Died: 6 January 2017
Preceded by Ertuğrul Osman	Head of the Osmanoğlu family 23 September 2009 – 6 January 2017	Succeeded by Dündar Ali Osman
