= Ottoman dynasty =

Royal family of the Ottoman Empire

House of Osman
- Imperial house
- Country: Ottoman Empire
- Founded: c. 1299; 727 years ago
- Founder: Osman I
- Current head: Harun Osman
- Final ruler: Mehmed VI (Ottoman sultan); Abdulmejid II (Ottoman caliph)
- Titles: Padishah; Sultan; Pasha; Bey; Khan; Ghazi; Qayser-i Rûm; Şehzade; Efendi; Çelebi; Caliph; Custodian of the Two Holy Mosques; Amir al-Mu'minin
- Traditions: Sunni Islam
- Deposition: 1 November 1922 (Ottoman Empire); 3 March 1924 (Ottoman Caliphate)
- Cadet branches: Osmanoğlu family

The Ottoman dynasty (Turkish: Osmanlı Hanedanı) consisted of the members of the imperial House of Osman (Ottoman Turkish: خاندان آل عثمان, romanized: Ḫānedān-ı Āl-i ʿOsmān), also known as the Ottomans (Turkish: Osmanlılar). According to Ottoman tradition, the family originated from the Kayı tribe (Note: A claim which has come under criticism from many historians, who argue either that the Kayı genealogy was fabricated in the fifteenth century, or that there is otherwise insufficient evidence to believe in it.) branch of the Oghuz Turks, under the leadership of Osman I in northwestern Anatolia in the district of Bilecik, Söğüt. The Ottoman dynasty, named after Osman I, ruled the Ottoman Empire from c. 1299 to 1922.

During much of the Empire's history, the sultan was the absolute monarch, head of state, and head of government, though much of the power often shifted to other officials such as the Grand Vizier. During the First (1876–1878) and Second Constitutional Eras (1908–1920) of the late Empire, a shift to a constitutional monarchy was enacted, with the Grand Vizier taking on a prime ministerial role as head of government and heading an elected General Assembly.

The imperial family was deposed from power and the sultanate was abolished on 1 November 1922 immediately after the Turkish War of Independence. The Republic of Turkey was declared the following year. The living members of the dynasty were initially sent into exile as personae non-gratae, though some have been allowed to return and live as private citizens in Turkey. In its current form, the family is known as the Osmanoğlu family.

== Name in English ==
From the 16th century until well into the 18th century, the name of Osman I was written in English as "Ottoman", "Otoman" or "Othoman" The adjective "Ottoman" comes from this name.

== History ==
The Ottoman dynasty operated under several basic premises: that the sultan governed the empire's entire territory, that every male member of the dynastic family was hypothetically eligible to become sultan, and that only one person at a time could be the sultan. Such rules were fairly standard for monarchic empires of the time. The certain processes through which men rose to the sultanate, however, were very specific to the Ottoman Empire. To go into greater detail about these processes, the history of succession between sultans can be divided into two eras: the period between the reign of Orhan (1323–1362), the first person to inherit the Ottoman sultanate, and the reign of Ahmed I (1603–1617); and the period following Ahmed I's reign.

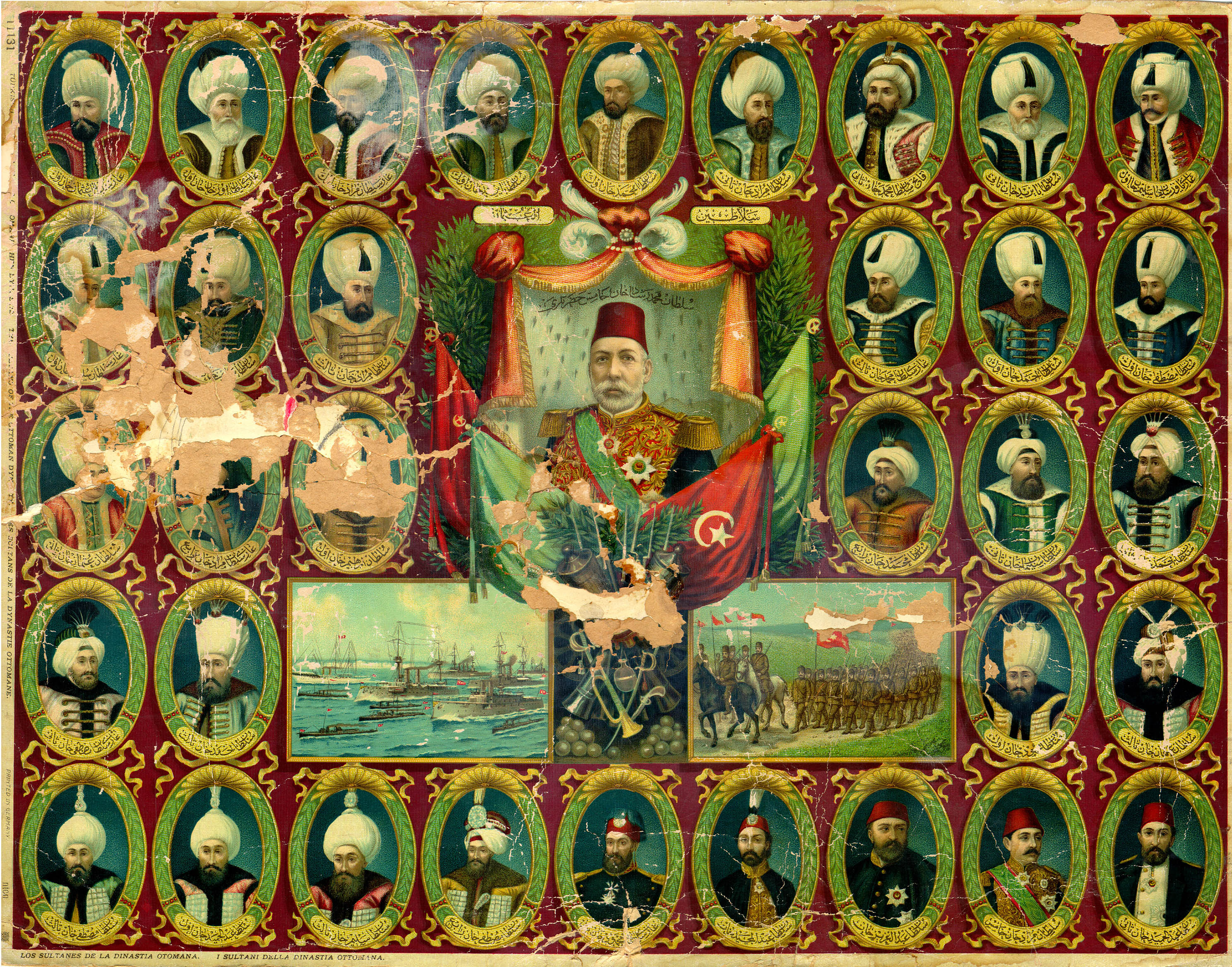
Sultans of the Ottoman dynasty

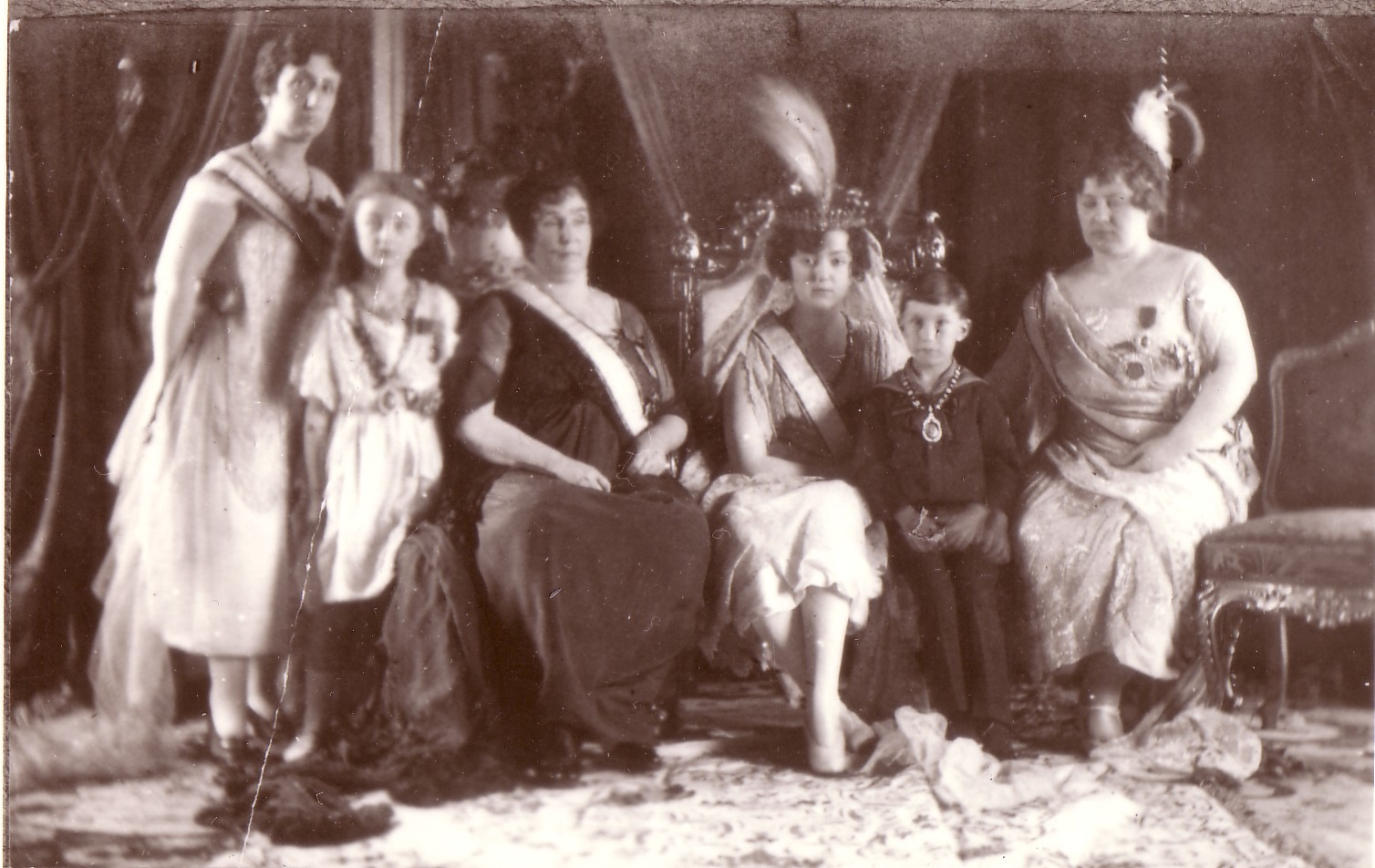
Rukiye Sabiha Sultan's wedding day in 1920, left to right: Fatma Ulviye Sultan, Ayşe Hatice Hayriye Dürrüşehvar Sultan, Emine Nazikeda Kadınefendi, Rukiye Sabiha Sultan, Mehmed Ertuğrul Efendi, Şehsuvar Hanımefendi

The succession process during the first period was dominated by violence and intra-familial conflict, in which the various sons of the deceased sultan fought until only one remained alive and, thus, inherited the throne. This tradition was known as fratricide in the Ottoman Empire but may have evolved from tanistry, a similar succession procedure that existed in many Turco-Mongolic dynasties predating the Ottomans. Sons of the sultan were often given provincial territories to govern until the sultan's death, at which point they would each vie for the throne. Each son had to, according to historian H. Erdem Cipa, "demonstrate that his fortune was superior to the fortunes of his rivals", a demonstration that often took the form of military accomplishment and ruthlessness. This violence was not considered particularly unexpected or unusual. As Cipa has noted, the Ottoman words for "successor" and "conflict" share the same Arabic root, and indeed, all but one of the successions in this roughly 200-year period involved a resolution by combat. Over time, the combat became increasingly prevalent and recognized, especially after a Janissary uprising negated Murad II's attempt to abdicate the throne peacefully to his son, Mehmed II, in 1444. During the eventual reign of Mehmed II (1451–1481), fratricide was legalized as an official practice; during the reign of Bayezid II (1481–1512), fratricide between Bayezid II's sons occurred before Bayezid II himself died; and after the reign of Murad III (1574–1595), his successor Mehmed III executed 19 brothers to claim the throne.

During the second period, the tradition of fratricide was replaced by a simpler and less violent procedure. Starting with the succession from Ahmed I to Mustafa I in 1617, the Ottoman throne was inherited by the eldest male blood relative – not necessarily the son – of the sultan, regardless of how many eligible family members were alive. The change in succession procedure was likely instigated by numerous factors, including fratricide's decline in popularity among Ottoman elites and Ahmed I's decision not to kill Mustafa when inheriting the throne from Mehmed III in 1603. With the door open for a policy change, a political debate arose between those who supported unrestricted sultanic privilege and those who supported a stronger, centralized law system that would supersede even the sultan's power to an extent. Historian Baki Tezcan has argued that the latter faction – with the help of the influential şeyhülislam Hocazade Esad Efendi – was able to prevail in this instance. The bloodless succession from Ahmed I to Mustafa I in 1617 "provided a reference for the eventual stabilization of the rule of Ottoman succession, the very regulation of which by an outside force was in effect a constitutional check on the dynastic prerogative," Tezcan has written. The precedent set in 1617 stuck, as the eldest living family member successfully inherited the throne in each of the following 21 successions, with relatively few instances of a son inheriting the throne.

== Succession practices ==
From the fourteenth through the late sixteenth centuries, the Ottomans practiced open succession – something historian Donald Quataert has described as "survival of the fittest, not eldest, son". During their father's lifetime, all adult sons of the reigning Osmanoğlu family's sultan were given provincial governorships in order to gain experience in administration (a practice commonly found in Central Asian tradition), accompanied and mentored by their retinues and tutors. Upon the death of their father, the reigning sultan, these sons would fight amongst themselves for the succession until one emerged triumphant. The first son to reach the capital and seize control of the court would usually become the new ruler. The proximity of a Şehzade (Prince) to Constantinople improved his chances of success, simply because he could hear of his father's death, seize control of the Ottoman court in the capital, and declare himself sultan first. A sultan could thus hint at his preferred successor by giving a favourite son a closer governorship. Bayezid II, for instance, had to fight his brother Cem Sultan in the 1480s for the right to rule.

Occasionally, the half-brothers would begin the struggle even before the death of their father. Under Suleiman the Magnificent (1520–1566), strife between his sons Şehzade Mustafa and Şehzade Selim (later Selim II) caused such internal turmoil that Suleiman ordered the deaths of both Şehzade Mustafa and another son, Şehzade Bayezid, leaving Şehzade Selim the sole heir.

During the reigns of Suleiman I and Selim II, the Haseki Sultan (Ottoman Turkish: خاصکى سلطان) or chief consort rose to greater prominence. Gaining power within the Imperial Harem, the favourite was able to manoeuvre to ensure the succession for one of her sons. This led to a short period of effective primogeniture. However, unlike in the earlier period, when the sultan had already defeated his brothers and potential rivals for the throne in battle, these sultans had the problem of many half-brothers who could act as the focus for rival factions. Thus, to prevent attempts at seizing the throne, reigning sultans practiced fratricide upon accession, starting with Murad I in 1362. Both Murad III and his son Mehmed III had their half-brothers murdered. The killing of all the new sultan's brothers and half-brothers (who were usually quite numerous) was traditionally done by manual strangling with a silk cord. As the centuries passed, the ritual killing was gradually replaced by lifetime solitary confinement in the "Golden Cage" or kafes, a room in the harem from where the sultan's brothers could never escape, unless perchance they became heir presumptive. Some had already become mentally unstable by the time they were asked to reign.

Mehmed III was the last sultan to have previously held a provincial governorship. Sons now remained within the harem until the death of their father. This not only denied them the ability to form powerful factions capable of usurping their father but also denied them the opportunity to have children while their father remained alive. Thus, when Mehmet's son came to the throne as Ahmed I, he had no children of his own. Moreover, as a minor, there was no evidence he could have children. This had the potential to create a crisis of succession and led to a gradual end to fratricide. Ahmed had some of his brothers killed, but not Mustafa (later Mustafa I). Similarly, Osman II allowed his half-brothers Murad IV and Ibrahim to live. This led to a shift in the 17th century from a system of primogeniture to one based on agnatic seniority, in which the eldest male within the dynasty succeeded, also to guarantee adult sultans and prevent both fratricides as well as the sultanate of women. Thus, Mustafa succeeded his brother Ahmed; Suleiman II and Ahmed II succeeded their brother Mehmed IV before being succeeded in turn by Mehmed's son Mustafa II. Agnatic seniority explains why from the 17th century onwards a deceased sultan was rarely succeeded by his son, but usually by an uncle or brother. It also meant that potential rulers had to wait a long time in the kafes before ascending the throne, hence the old age of certain sultans upon their enthronement. Although attempts were made in the 19th century to replace agnatic seniority with primogeniture, they were unsuccessful, and seniority was retained until the abolition of the sultanate in 1922.

== Chronology of sultans ==
The genealogy of the Ottoman Sultans including their mothers

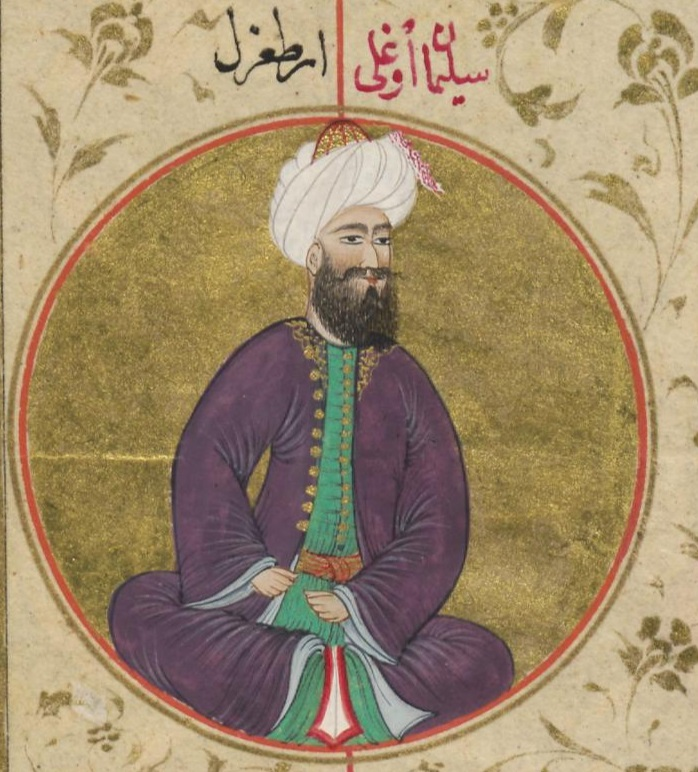
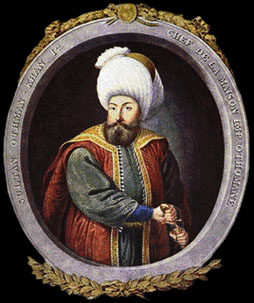
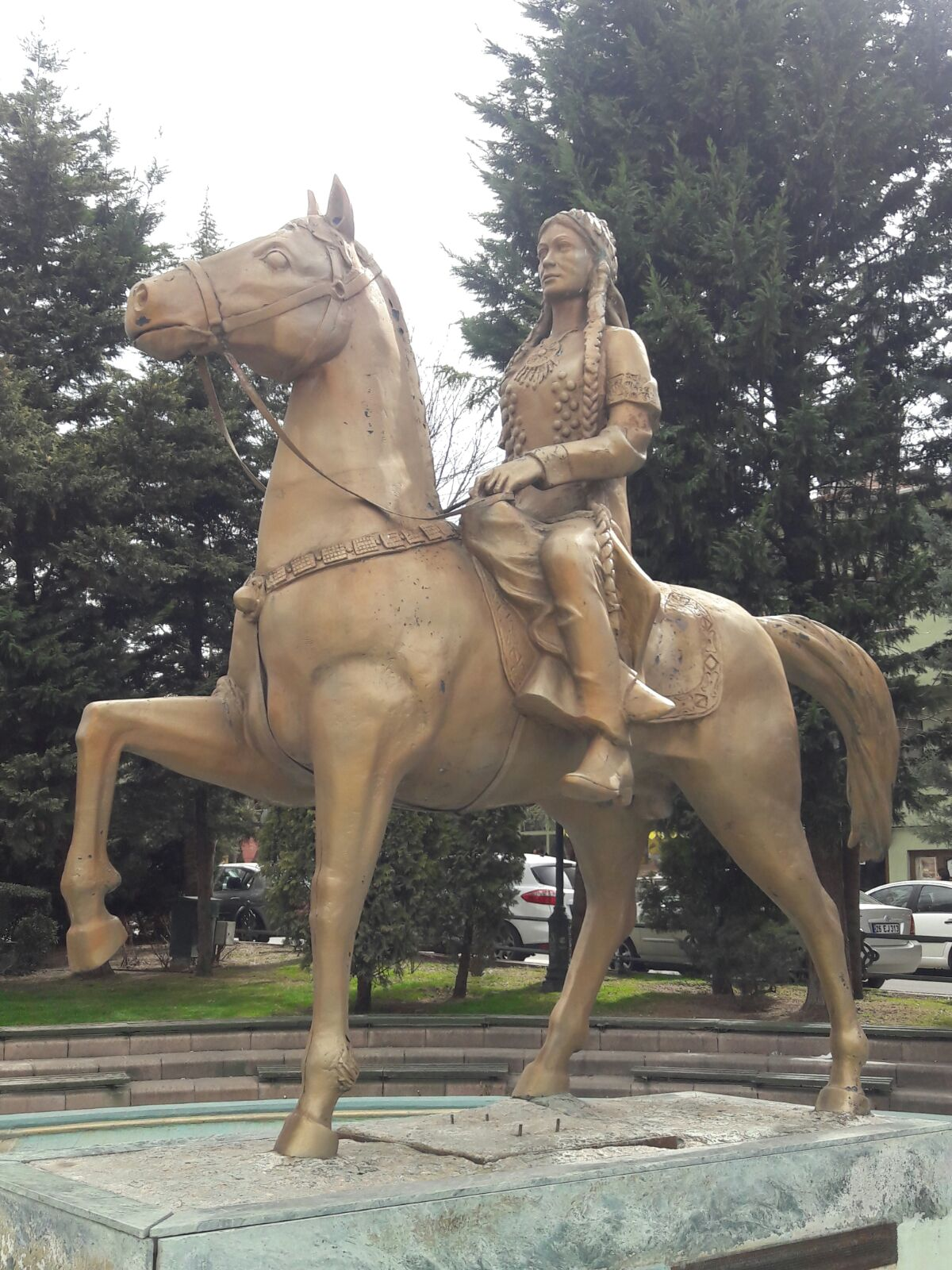
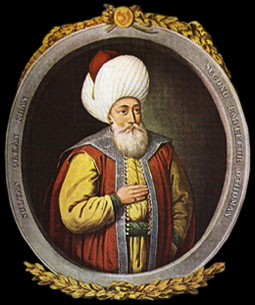
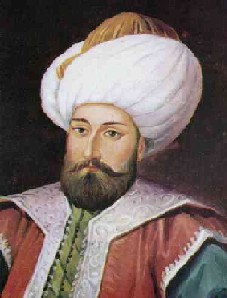
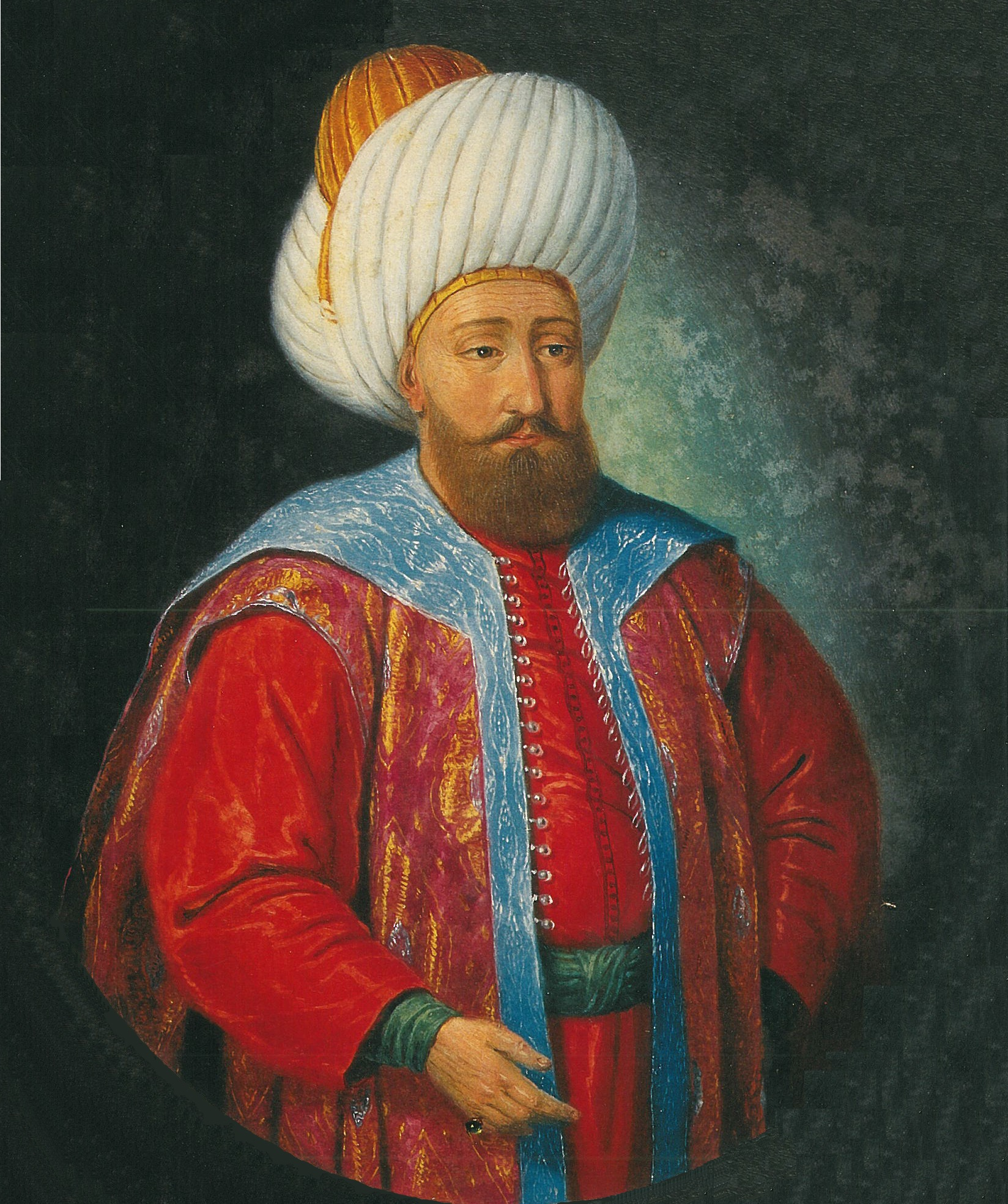
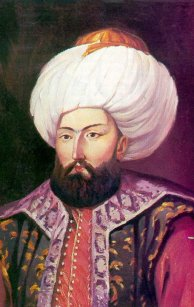
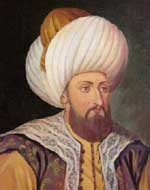
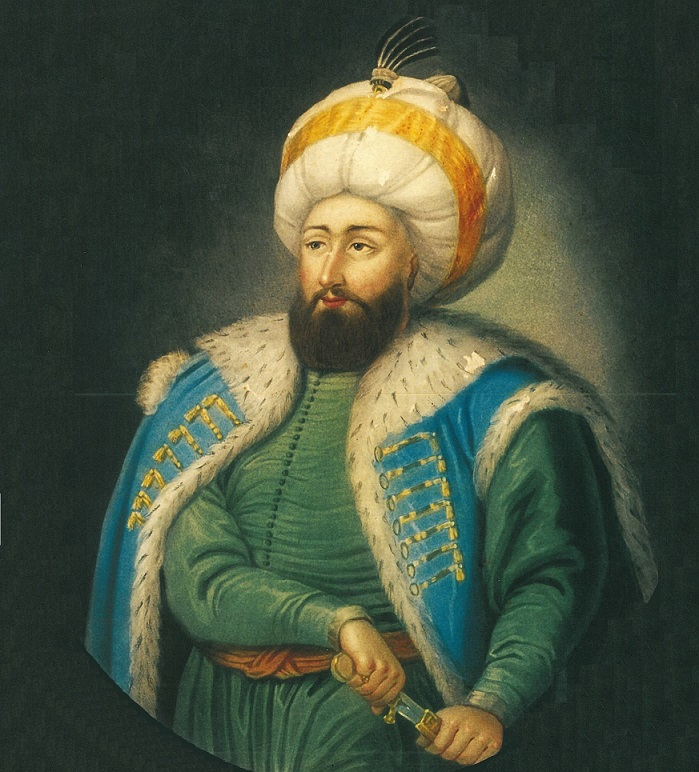
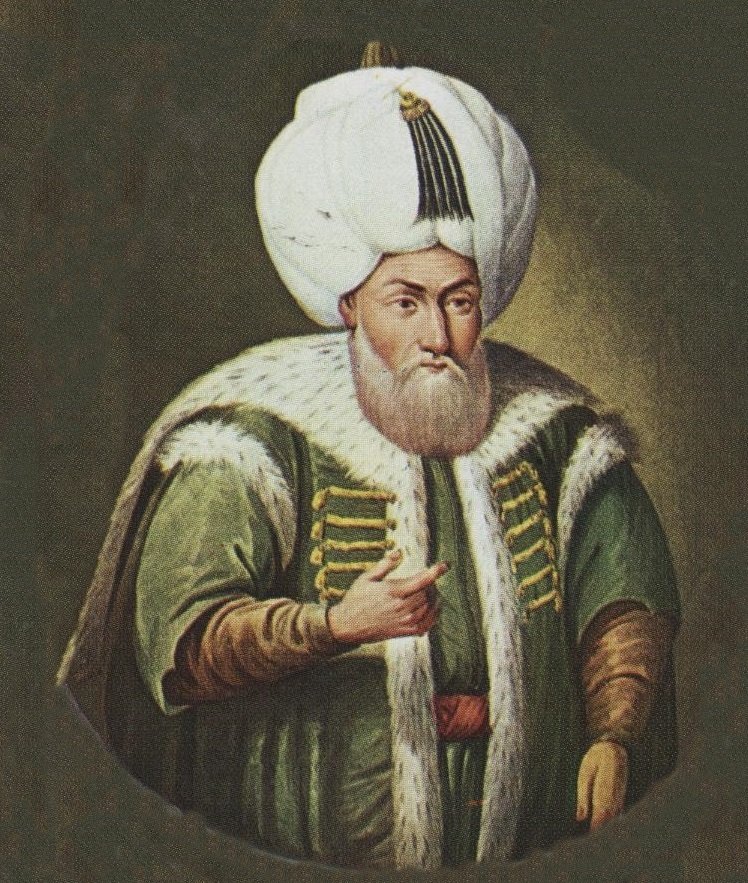
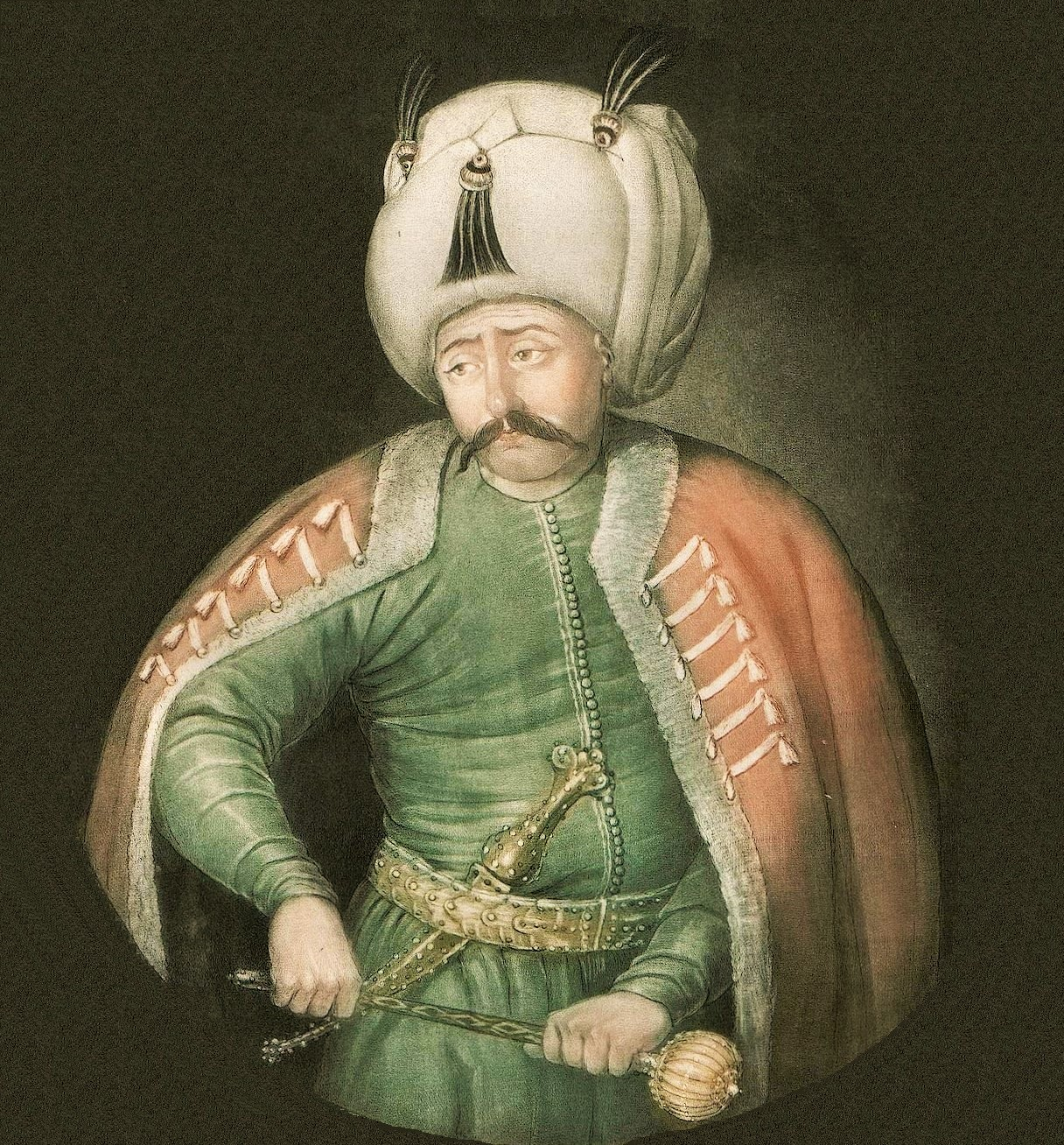
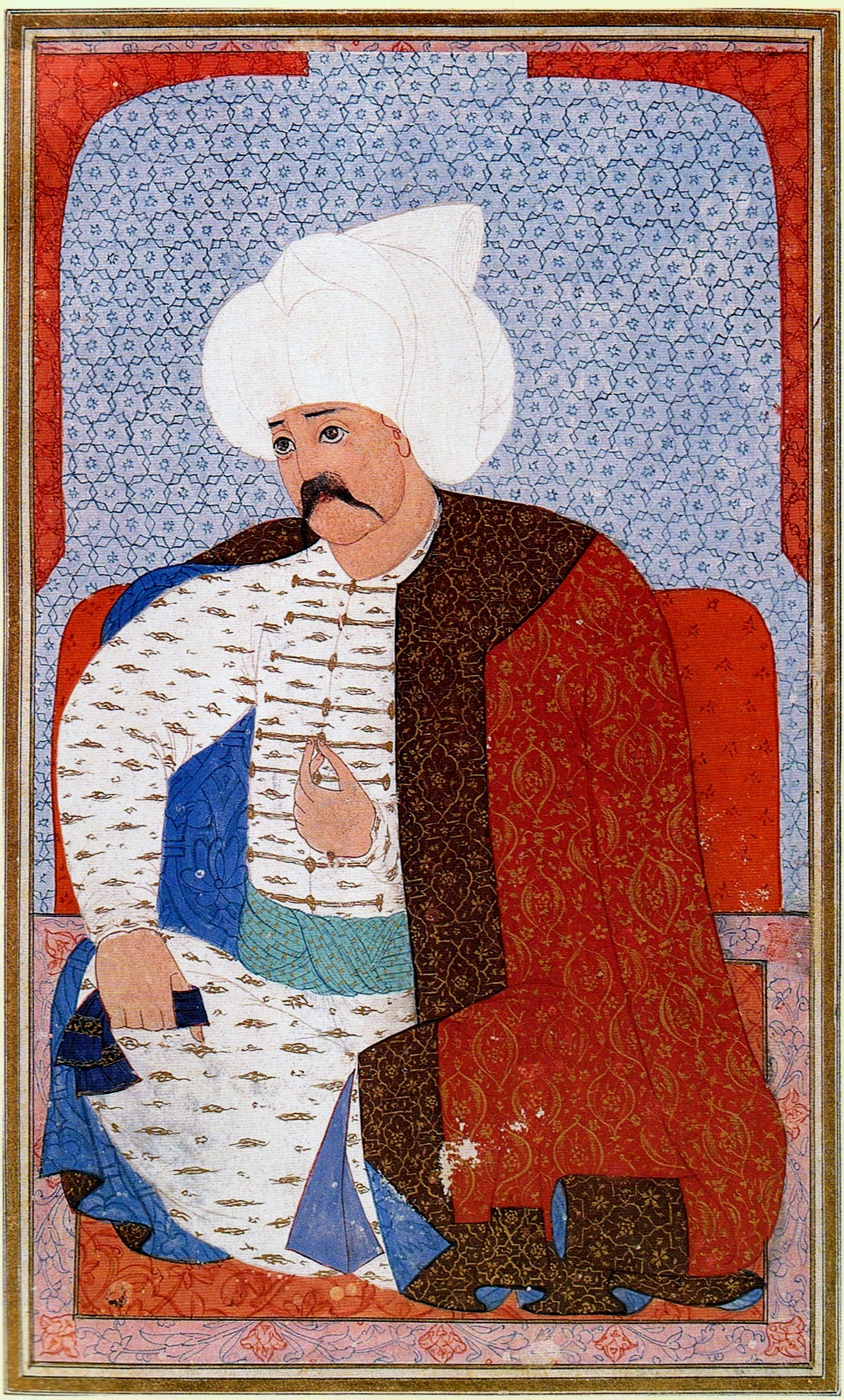
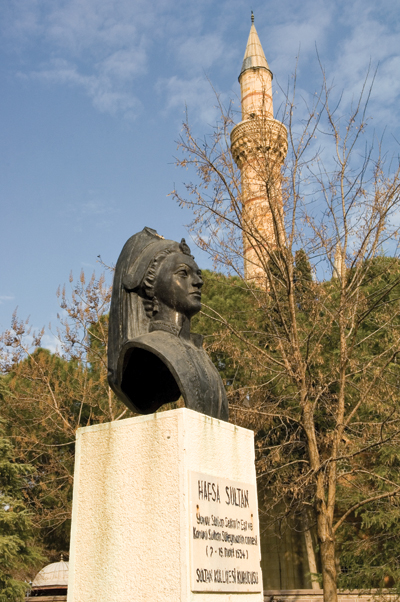
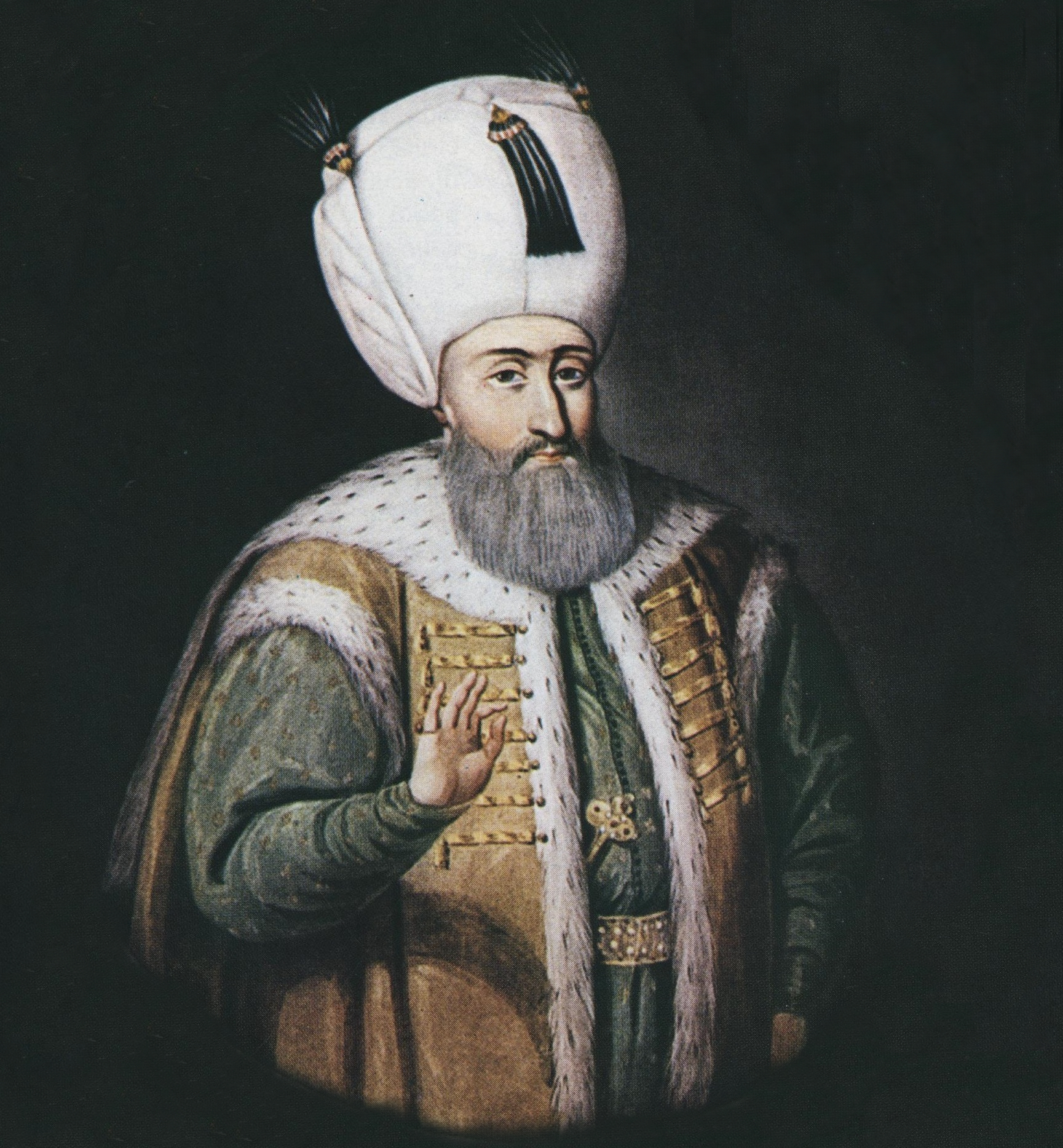
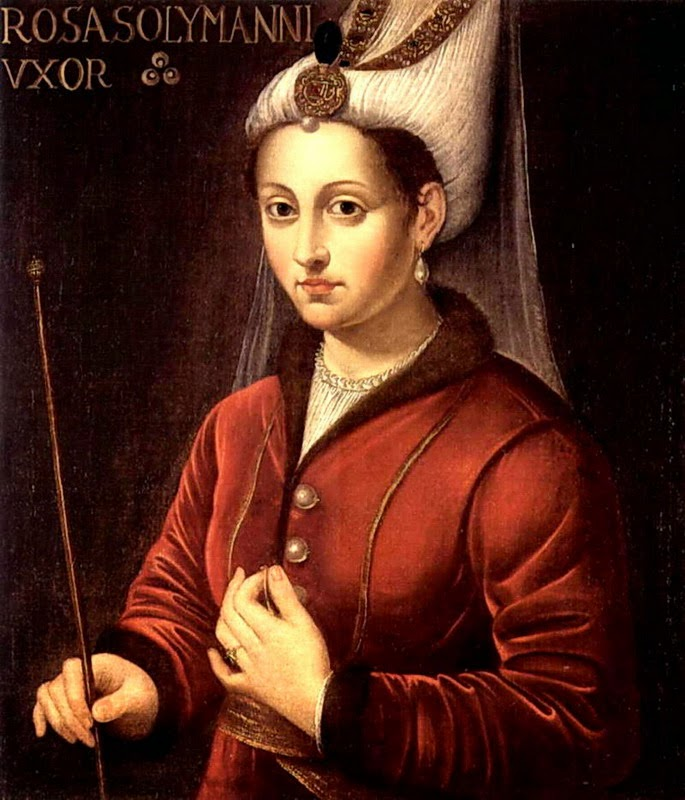
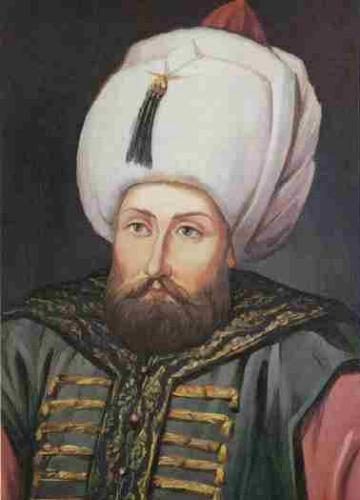
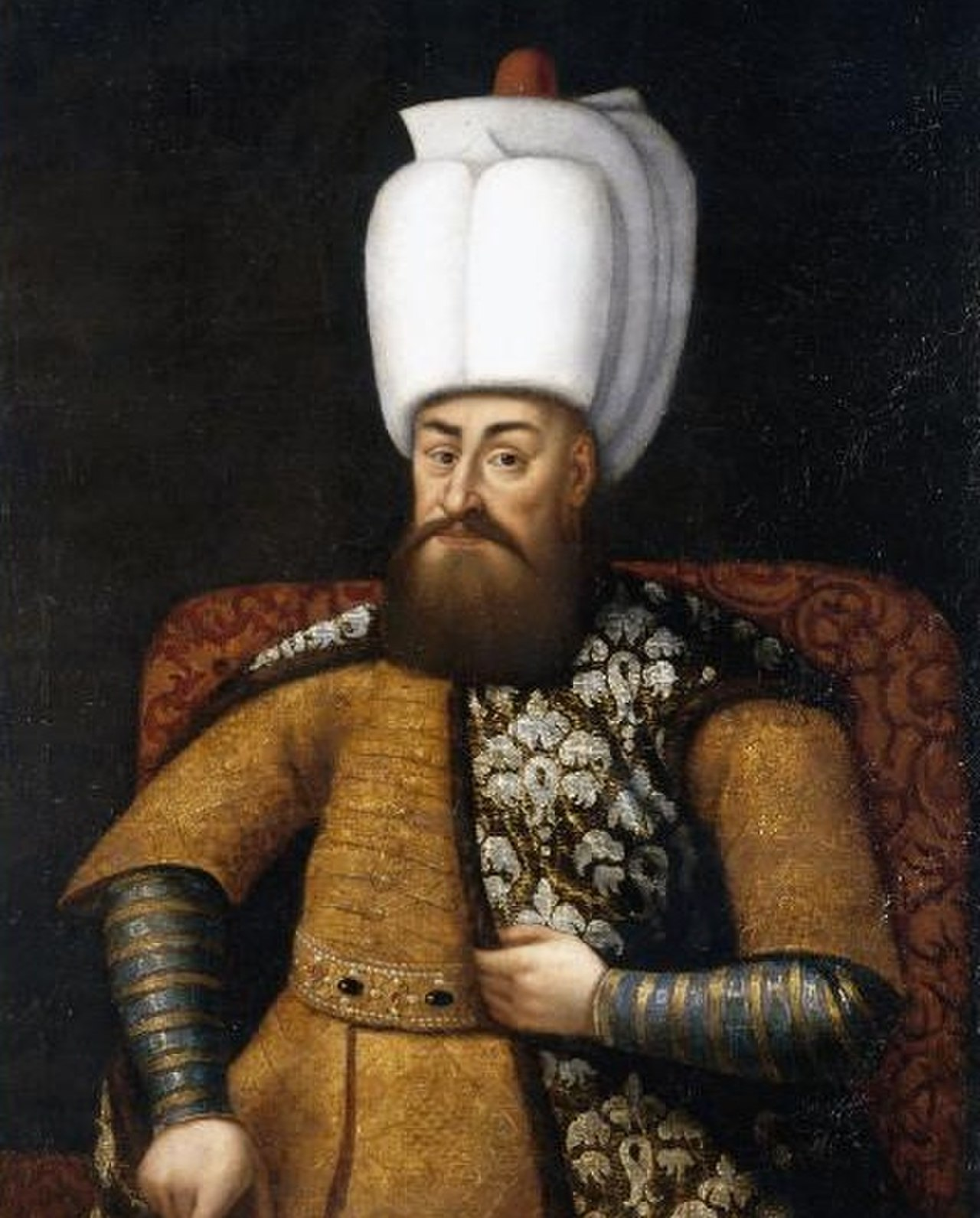
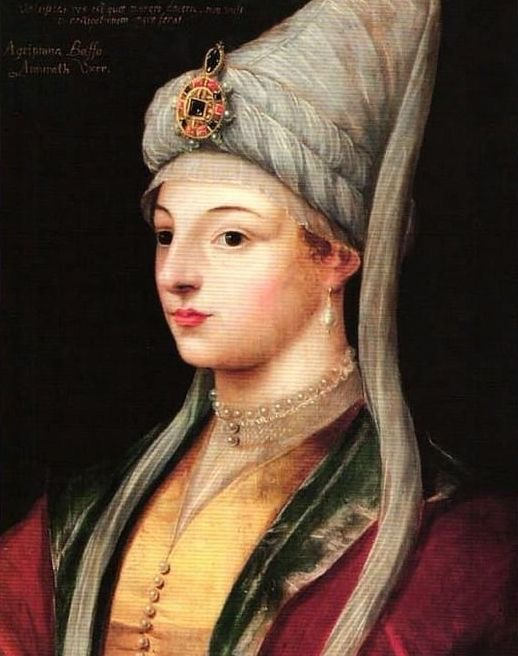
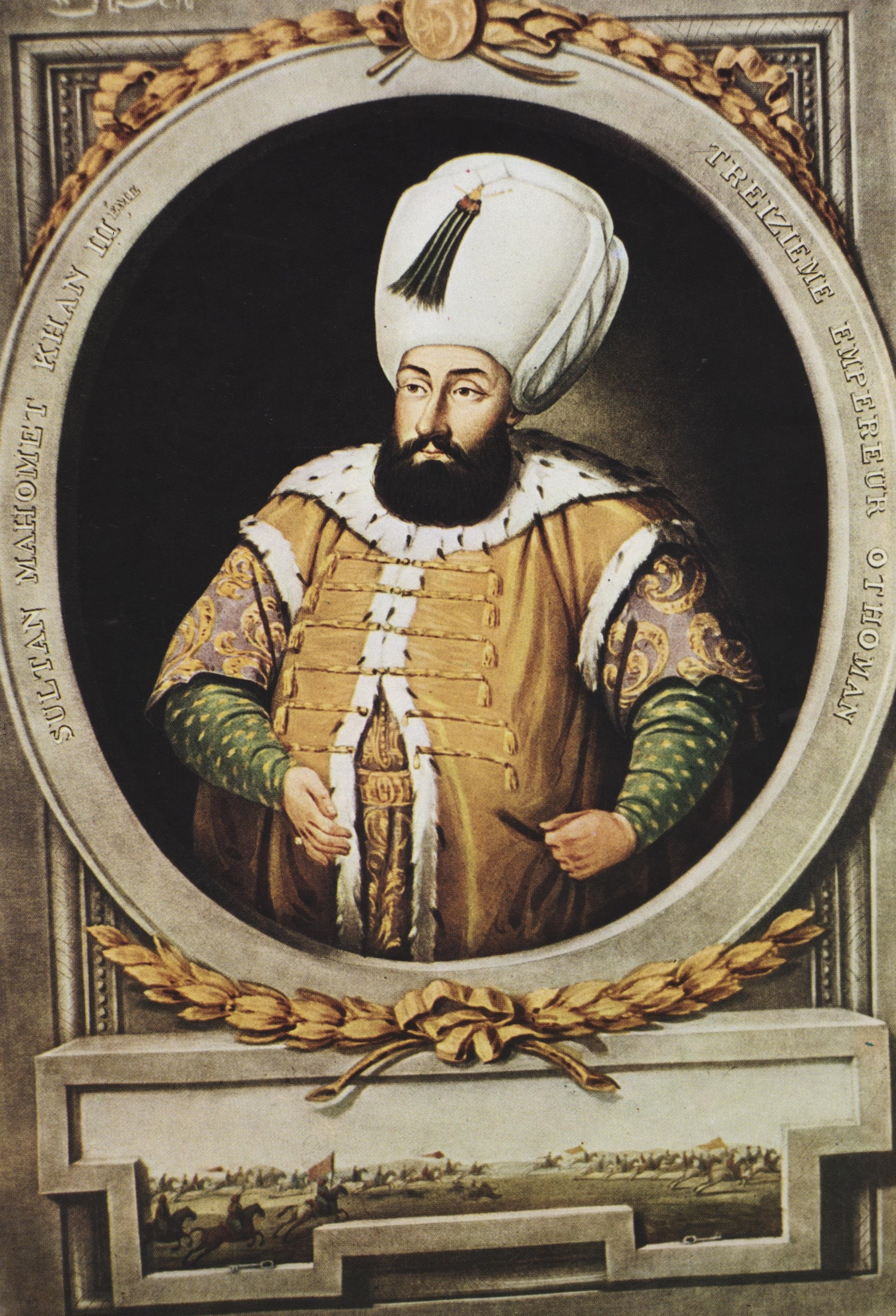
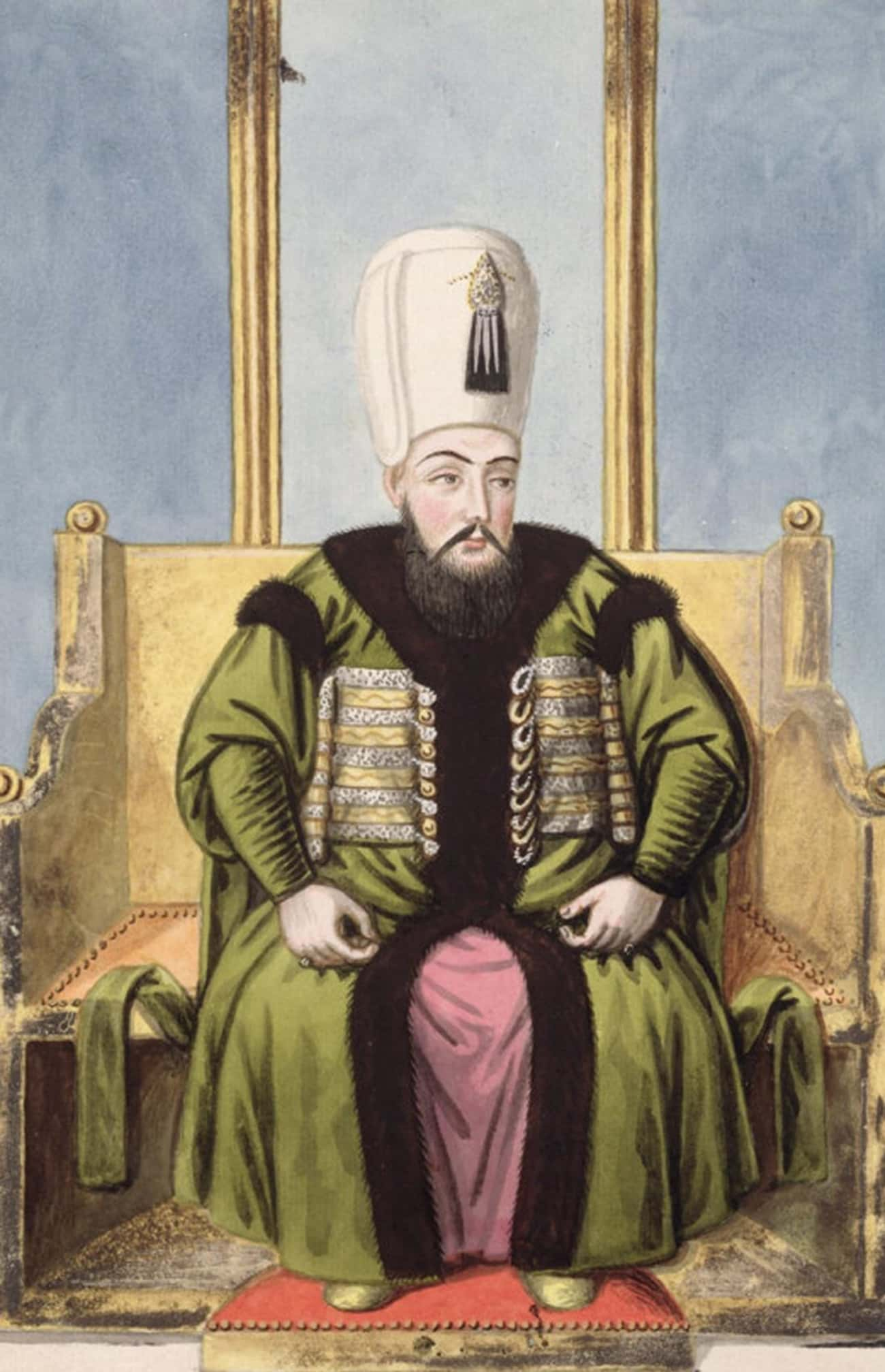
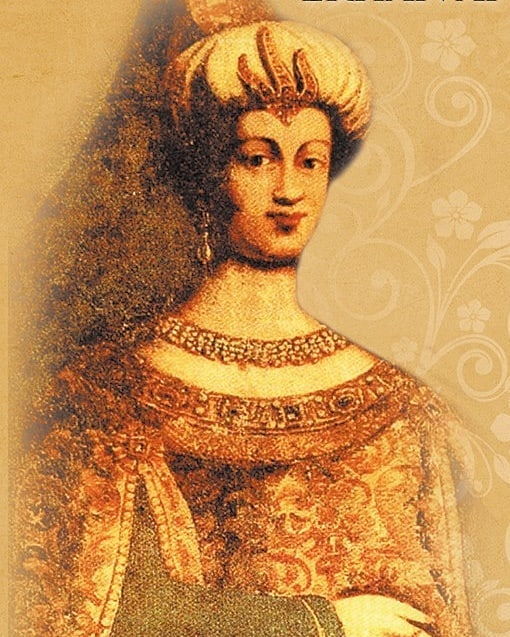
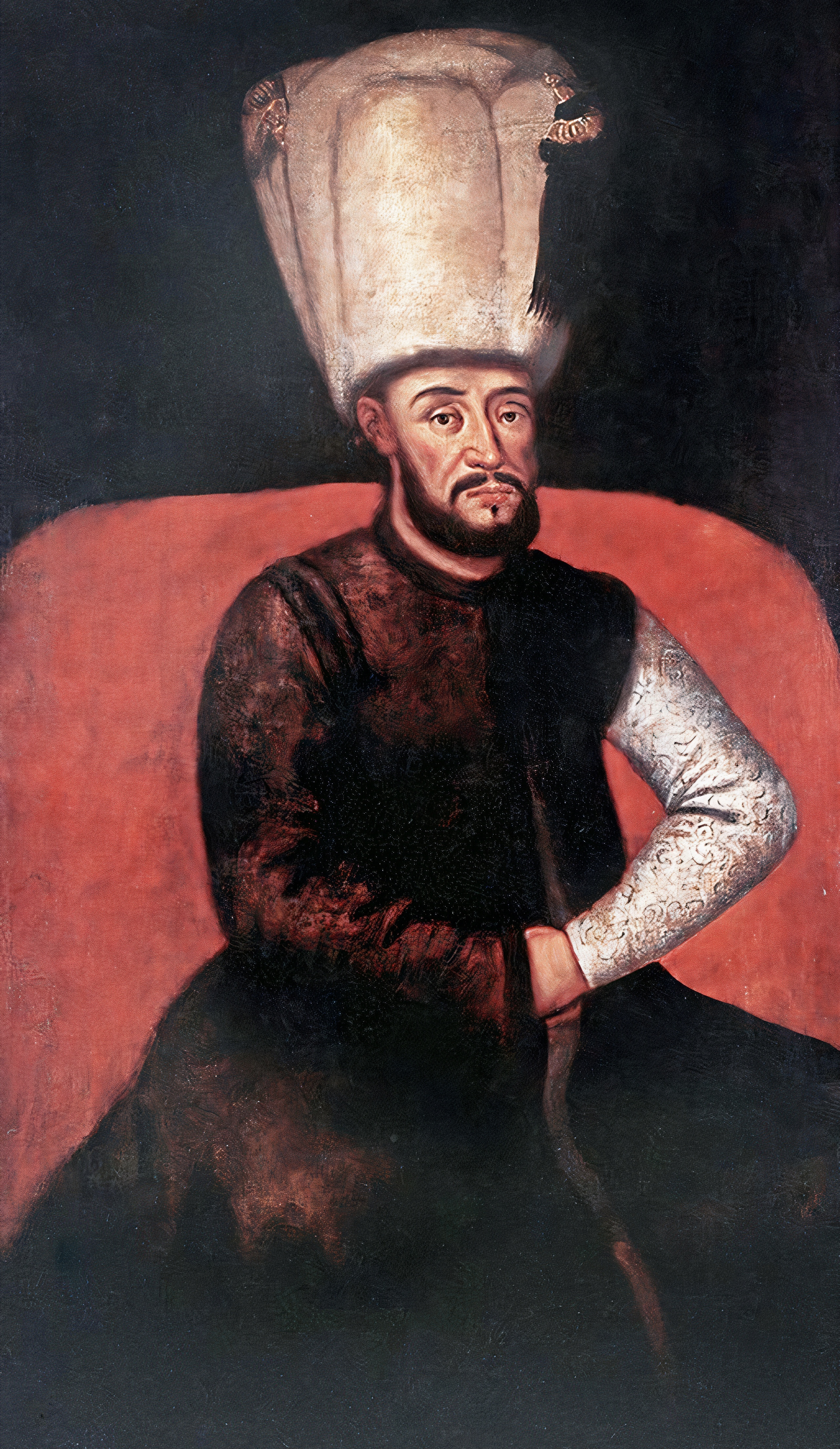
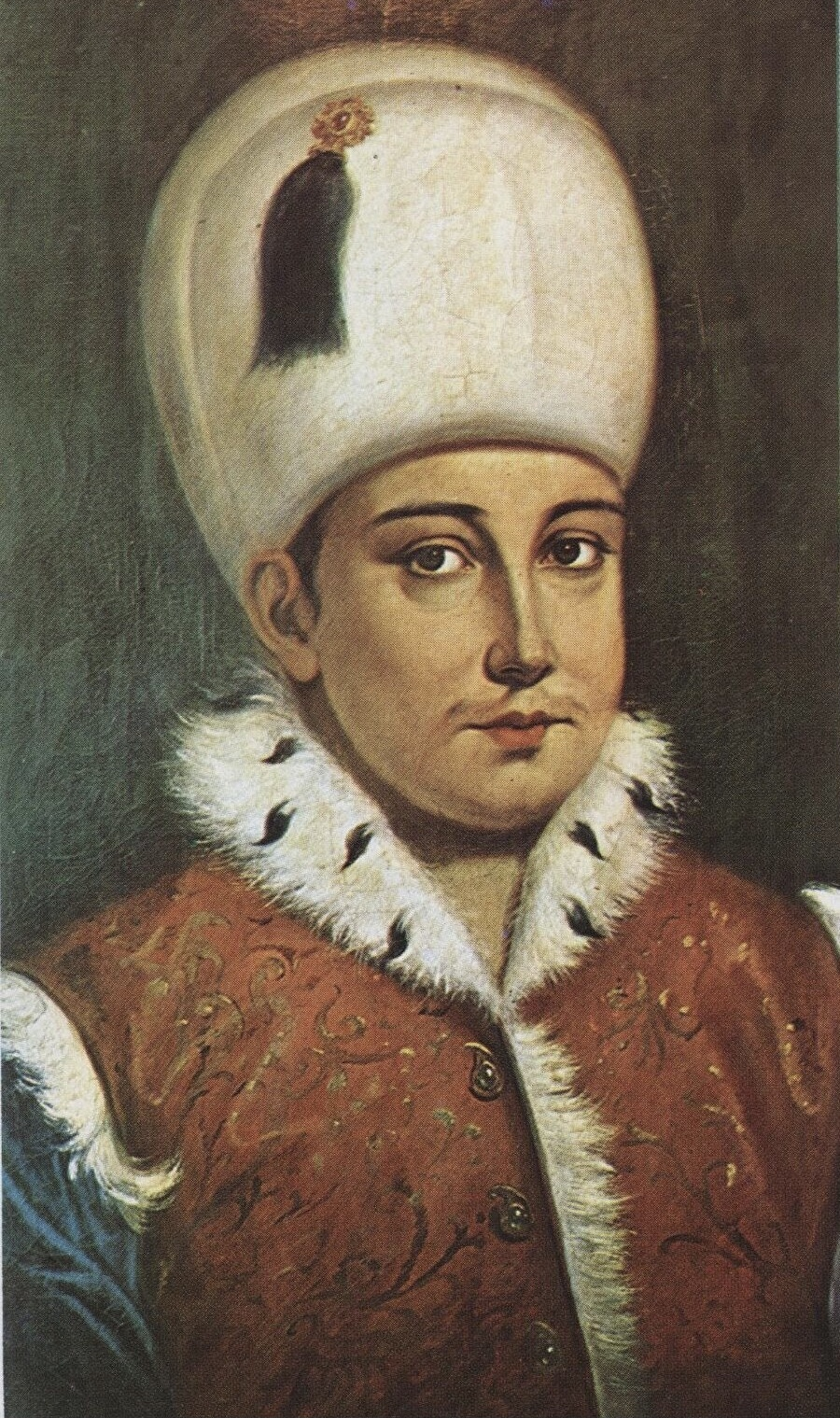
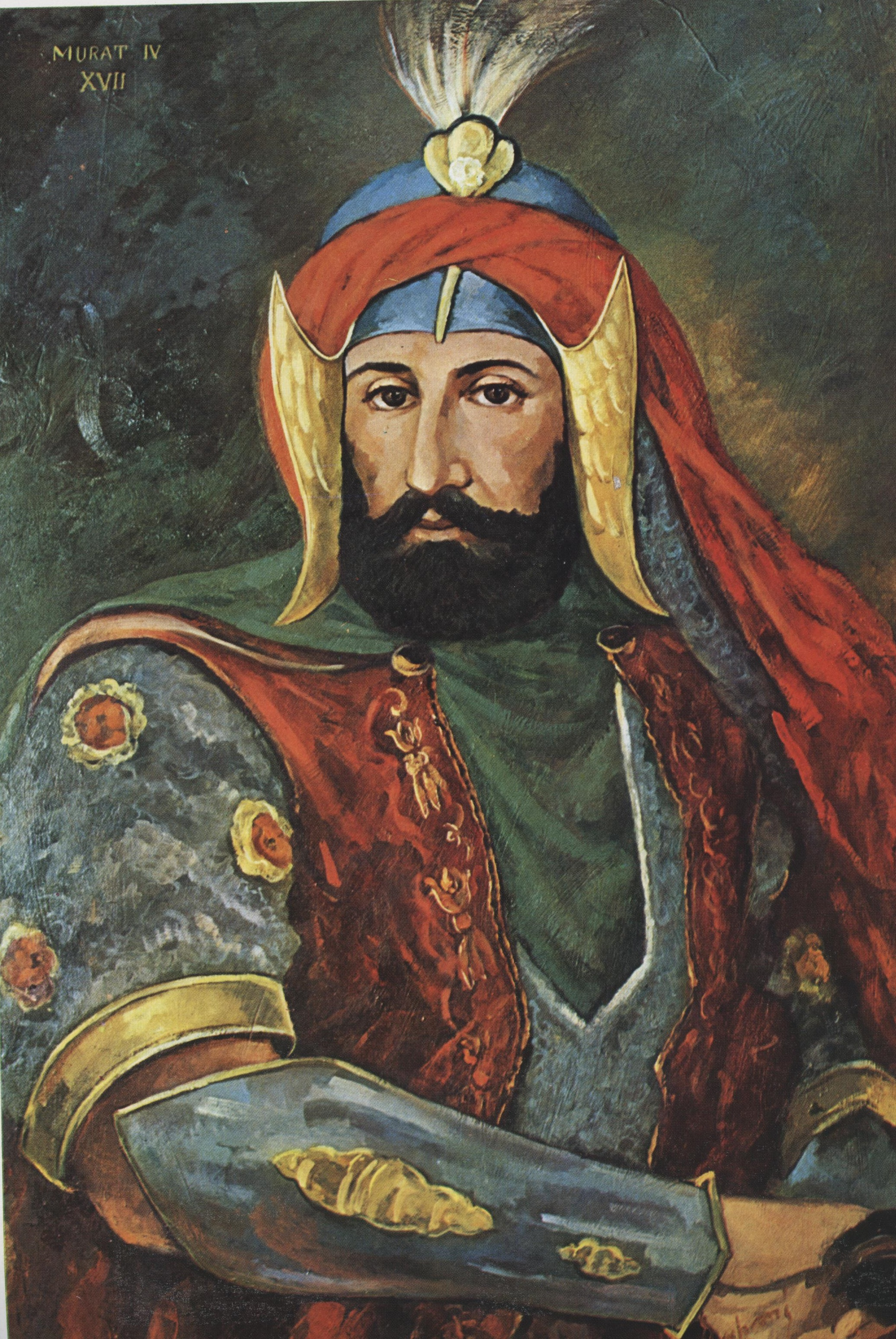
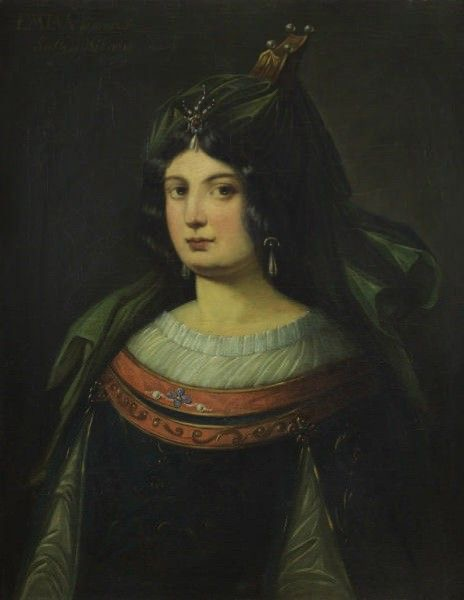
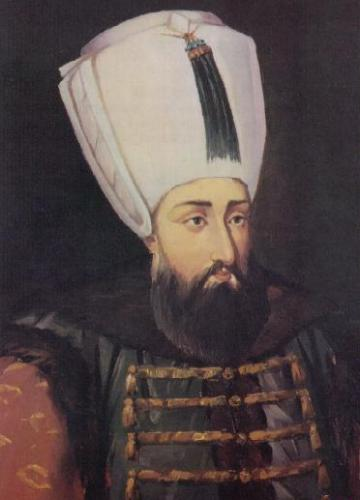
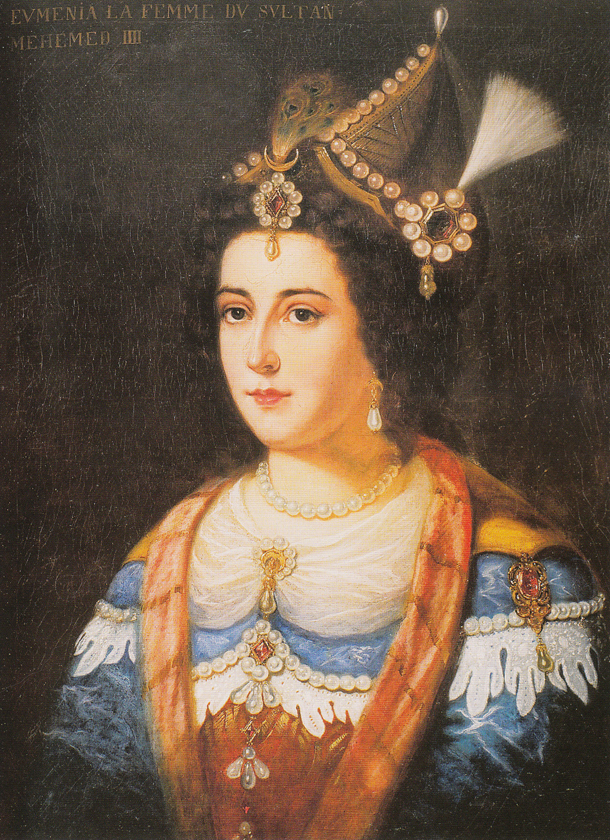
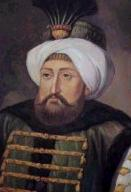
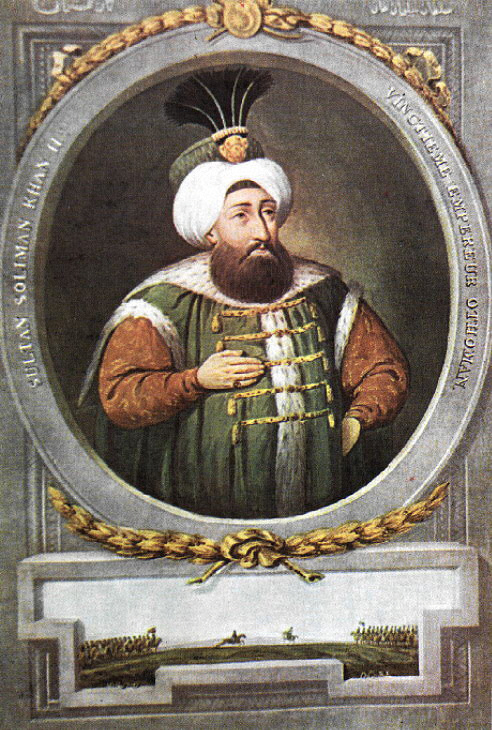
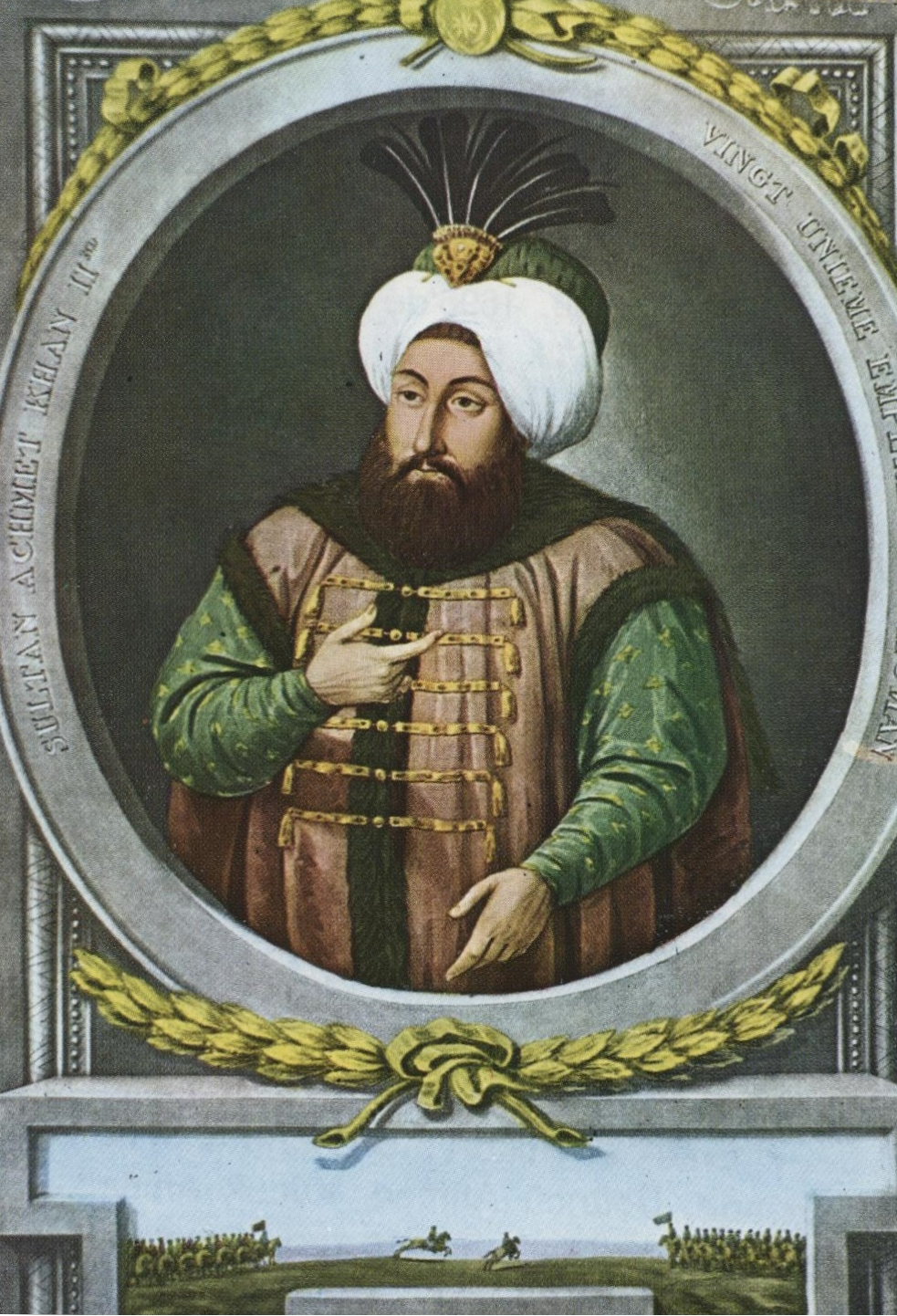
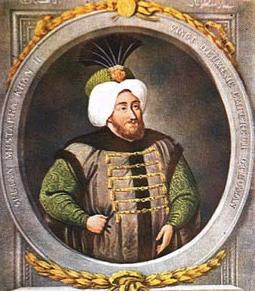
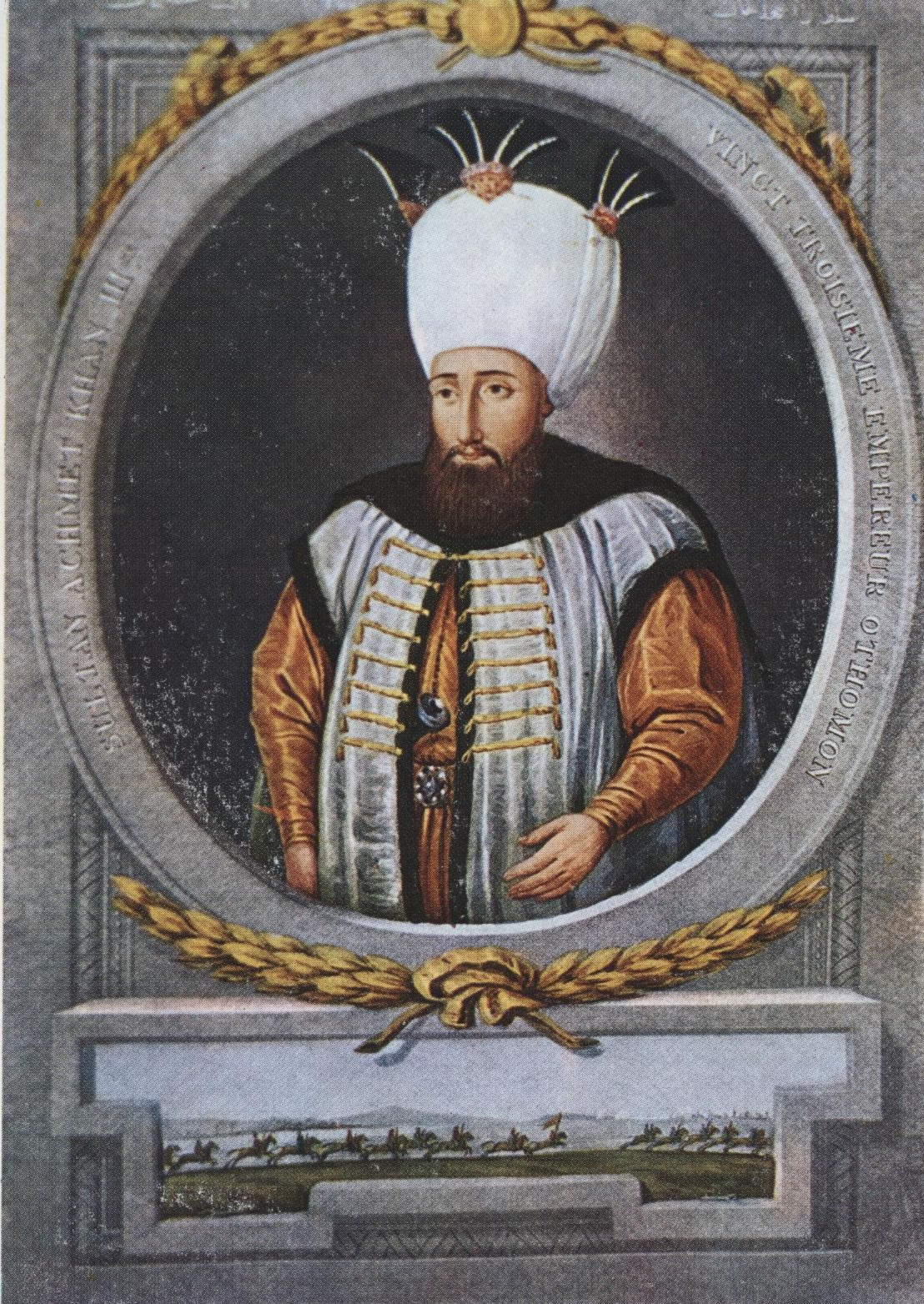
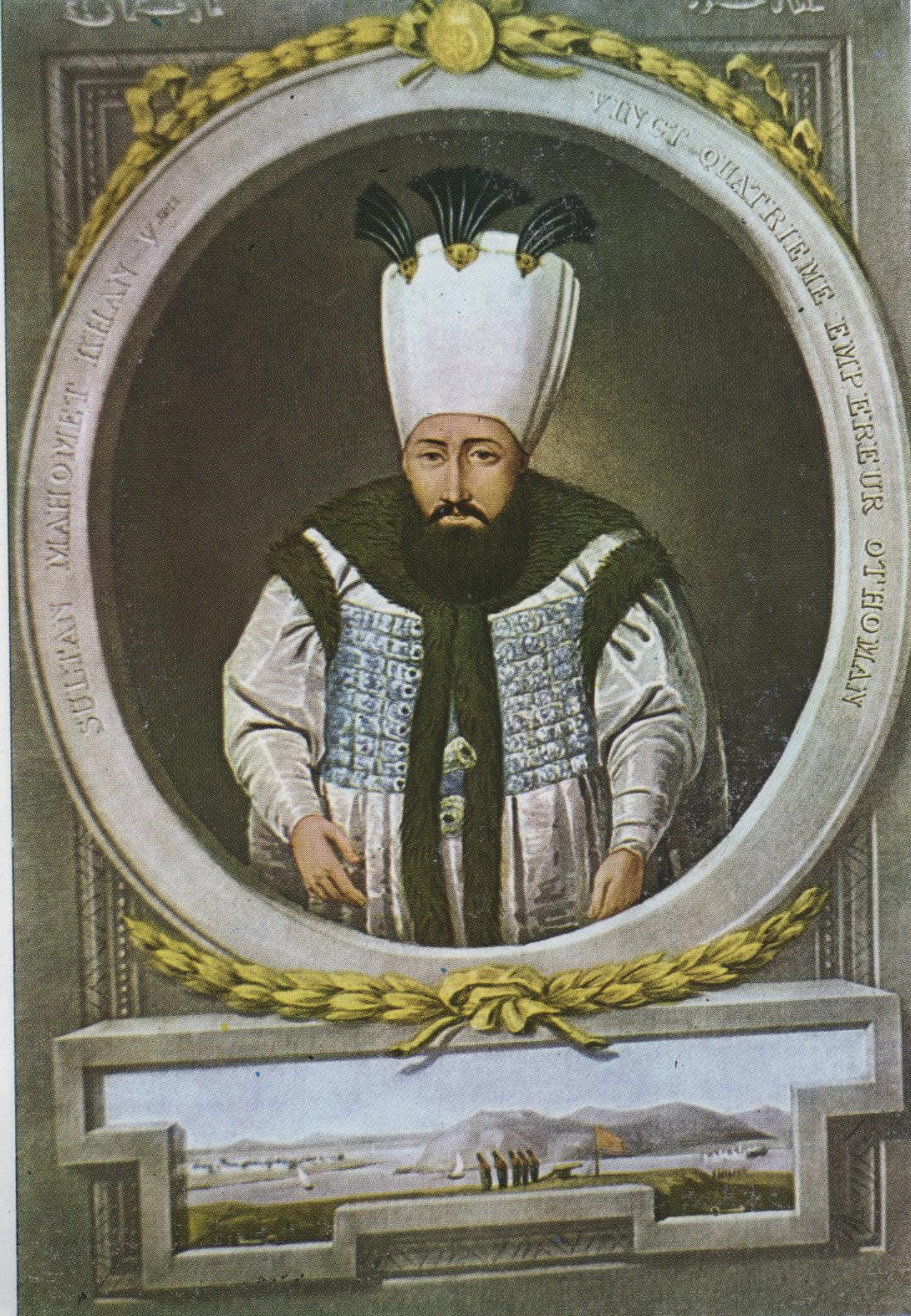
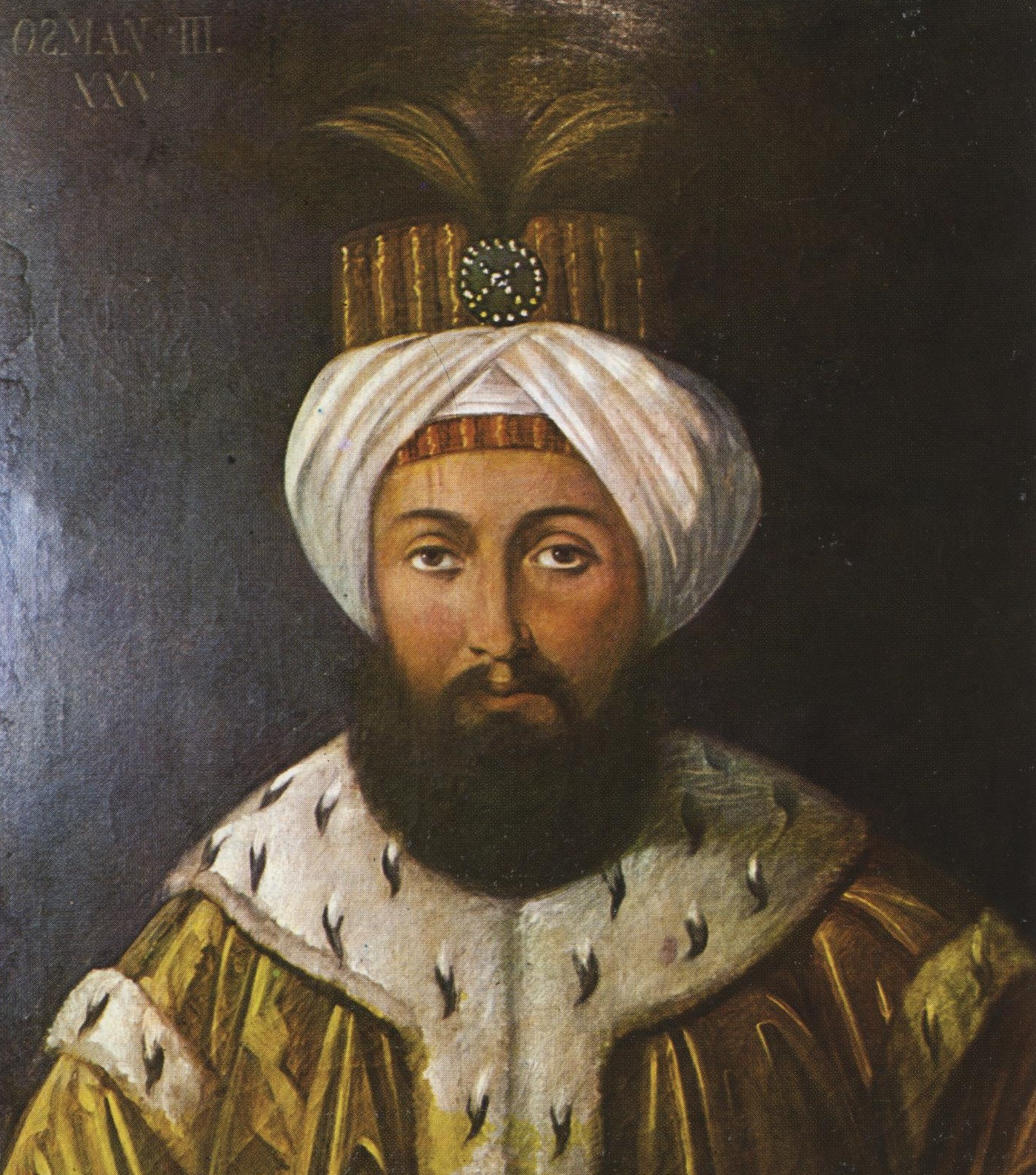
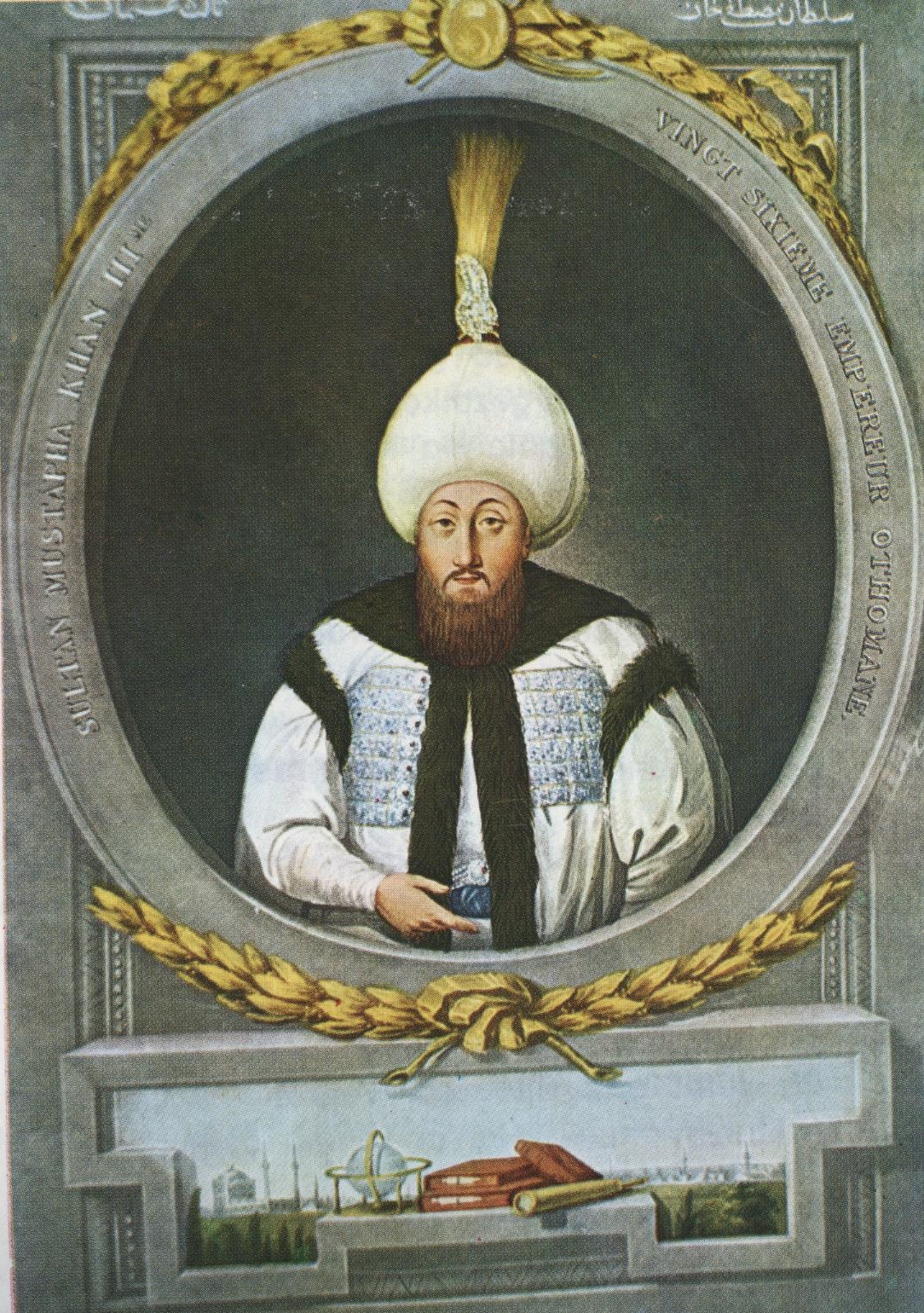
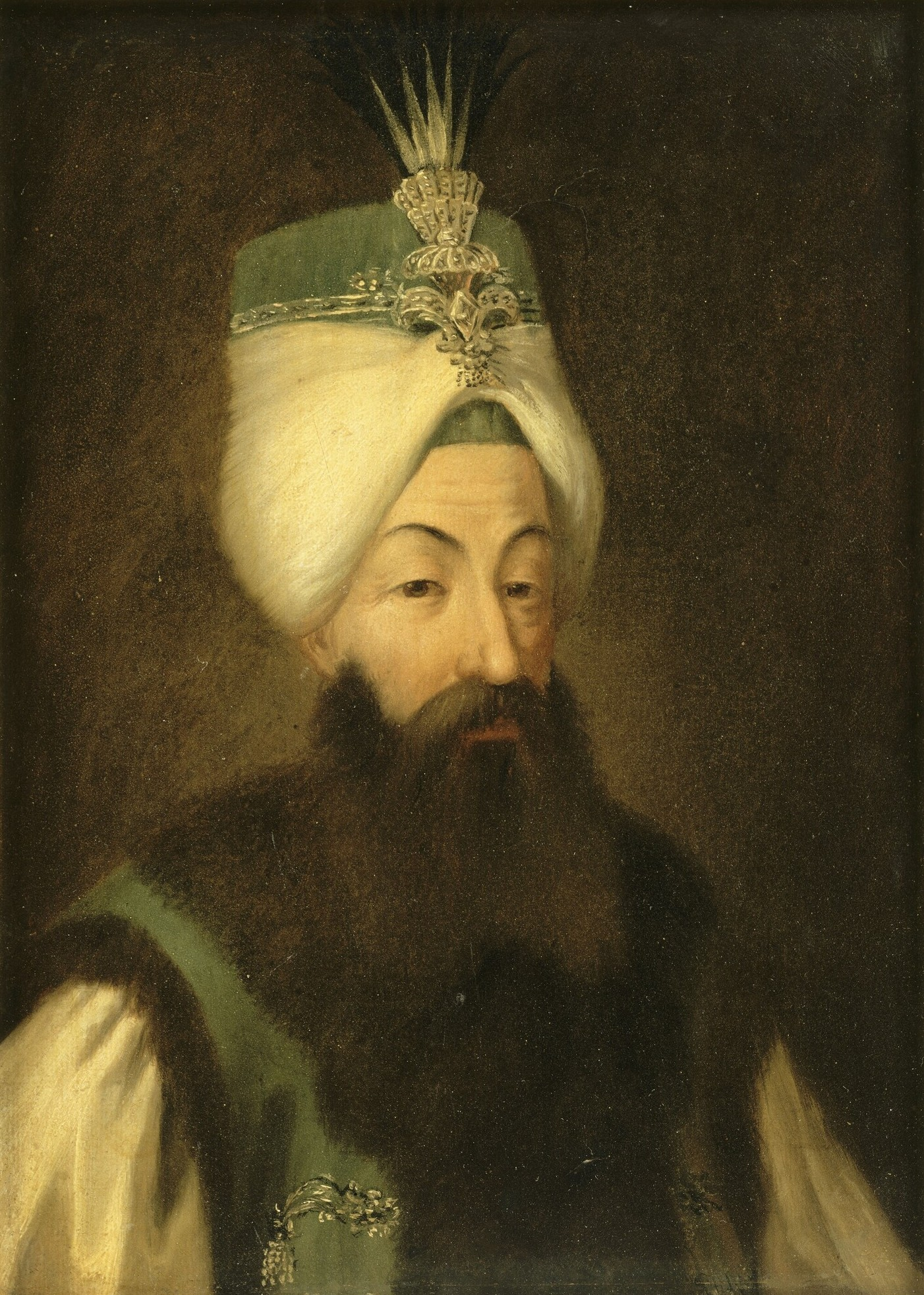
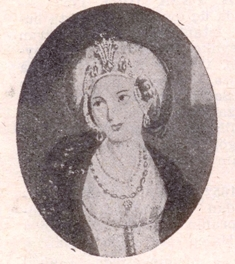
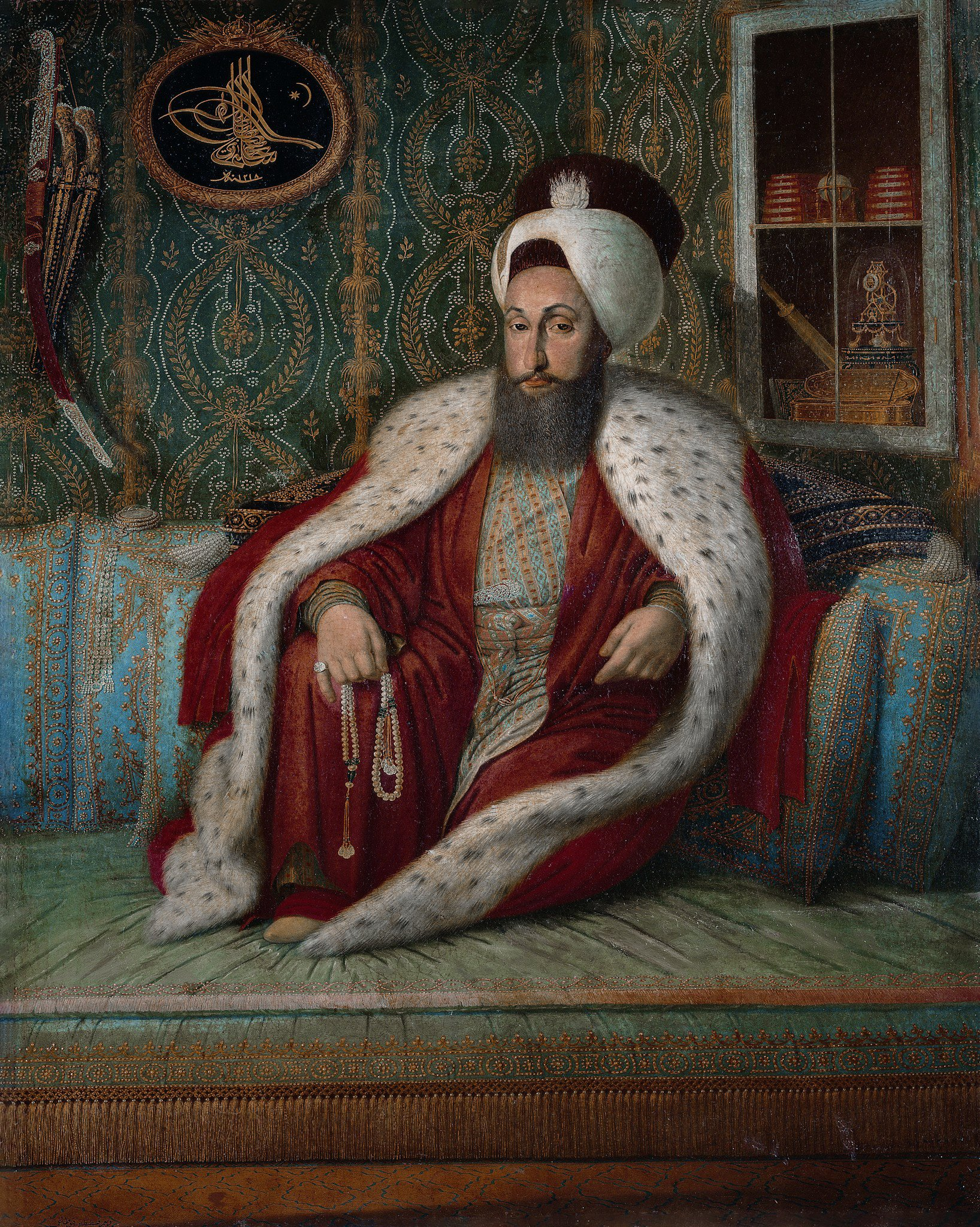
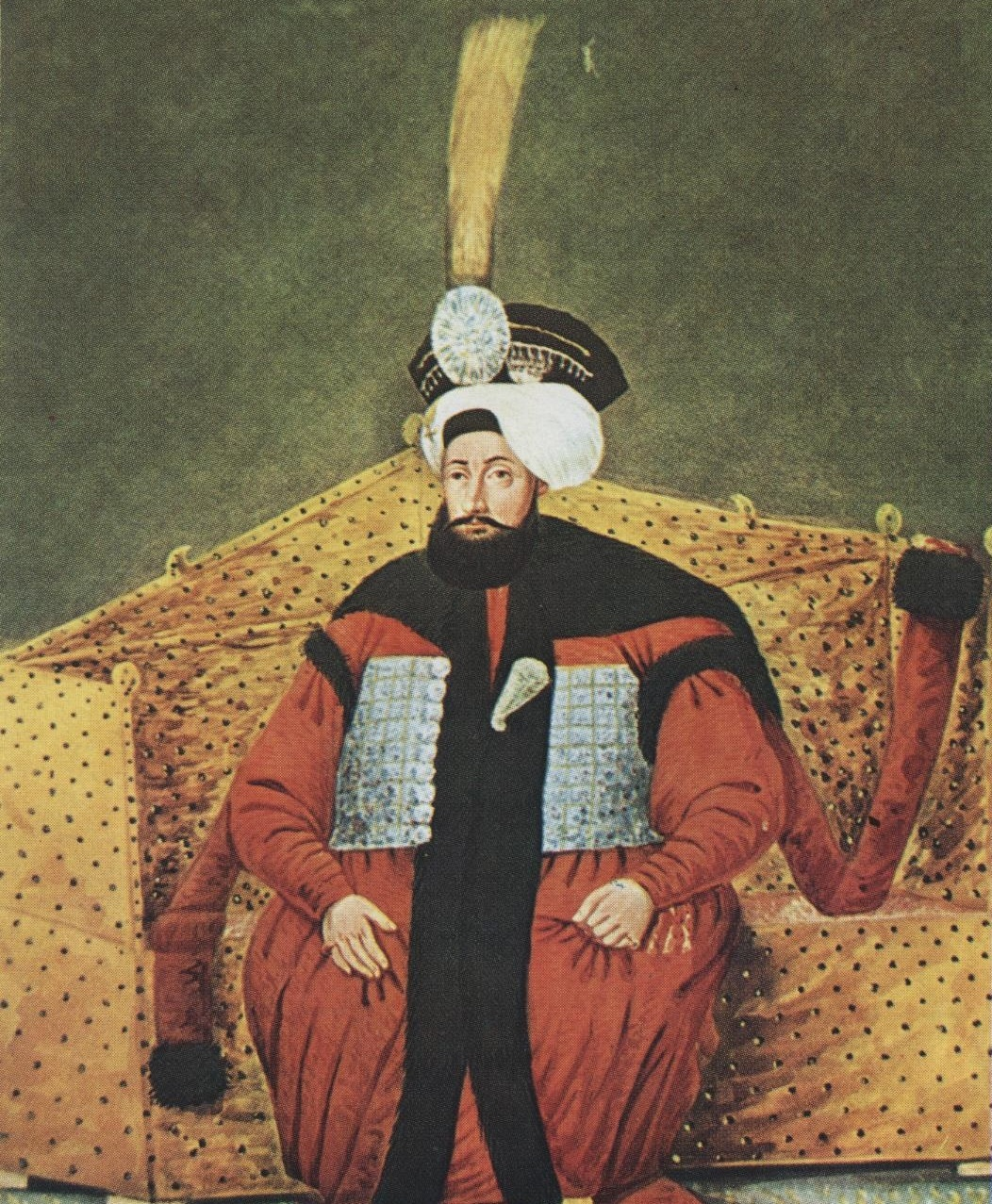
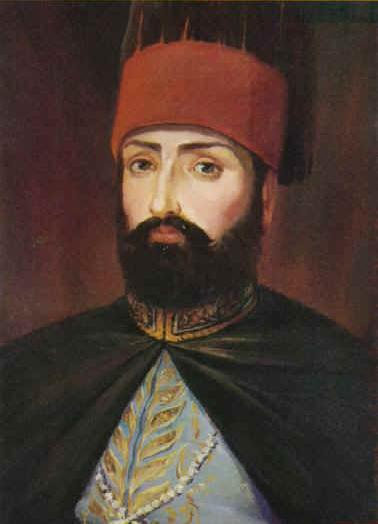
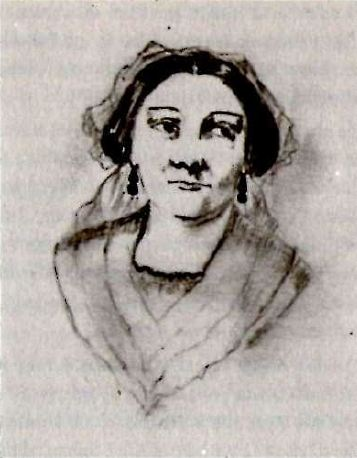
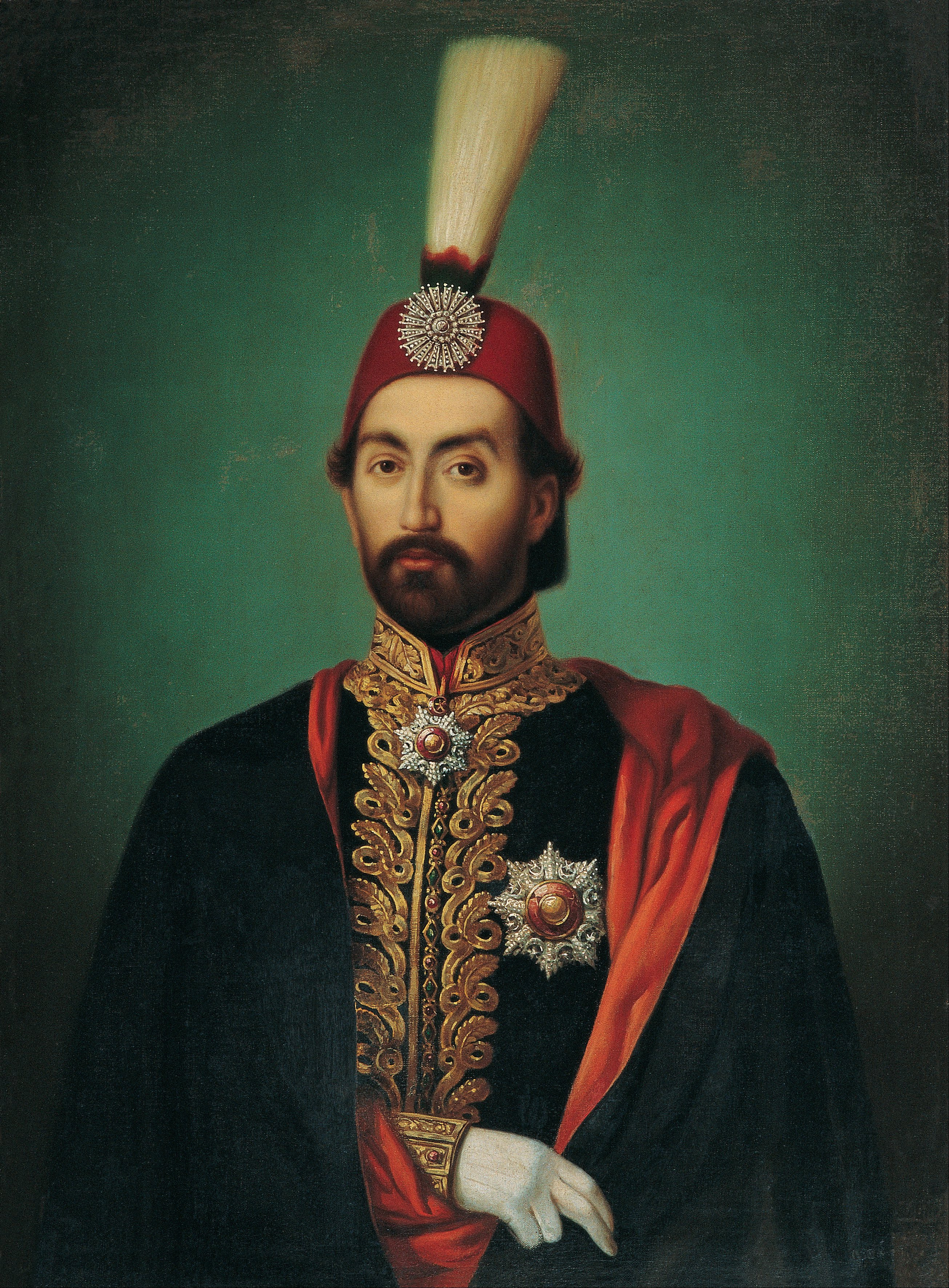
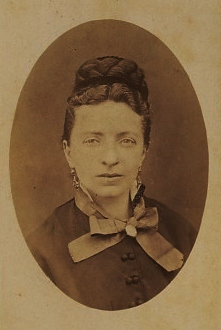
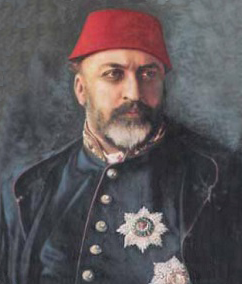
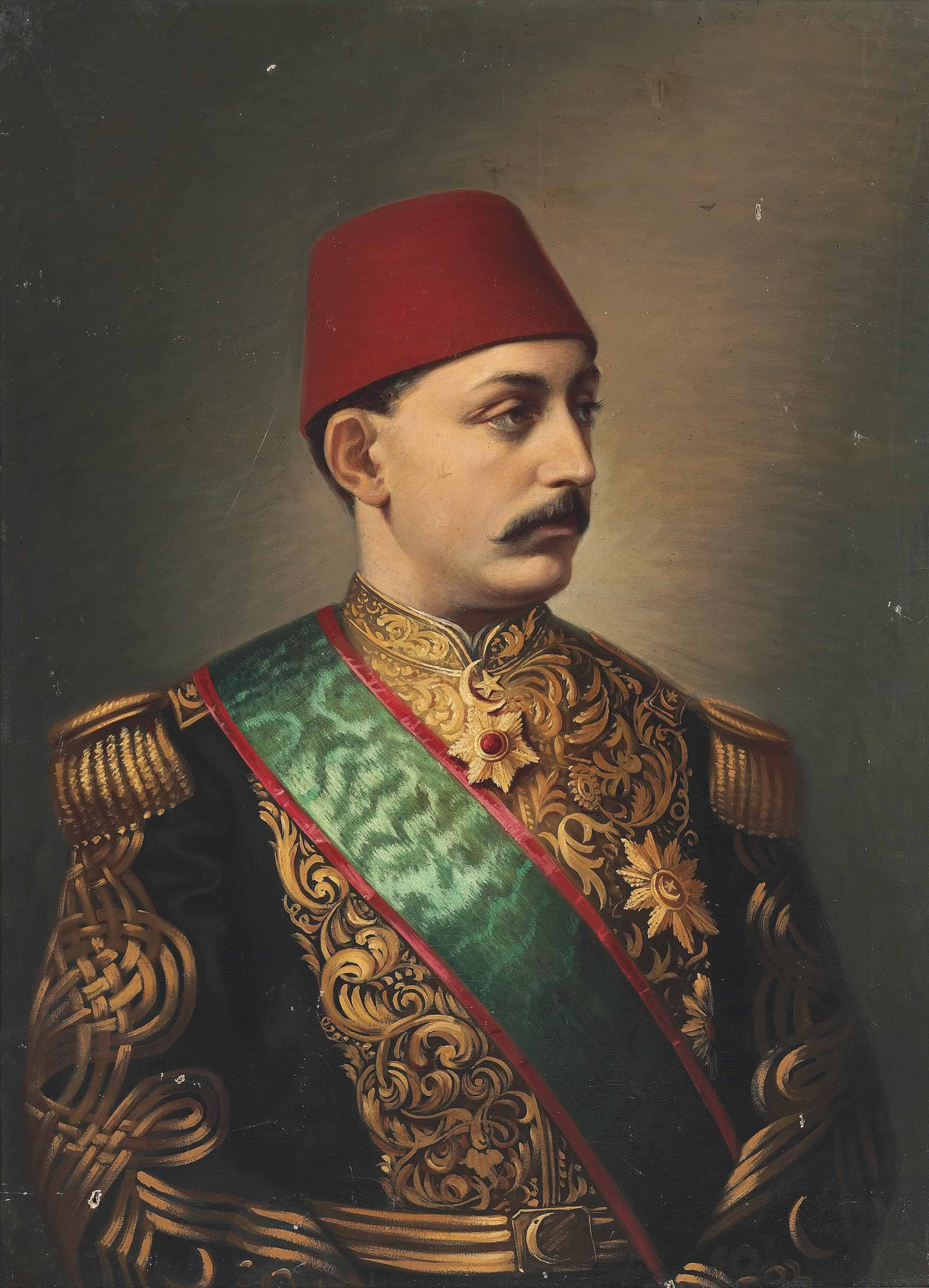
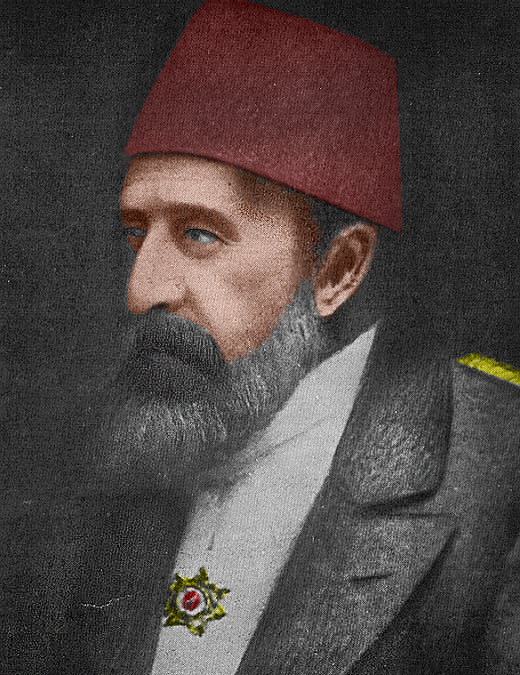
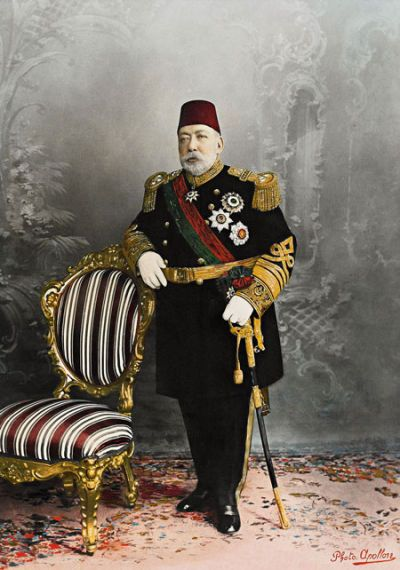
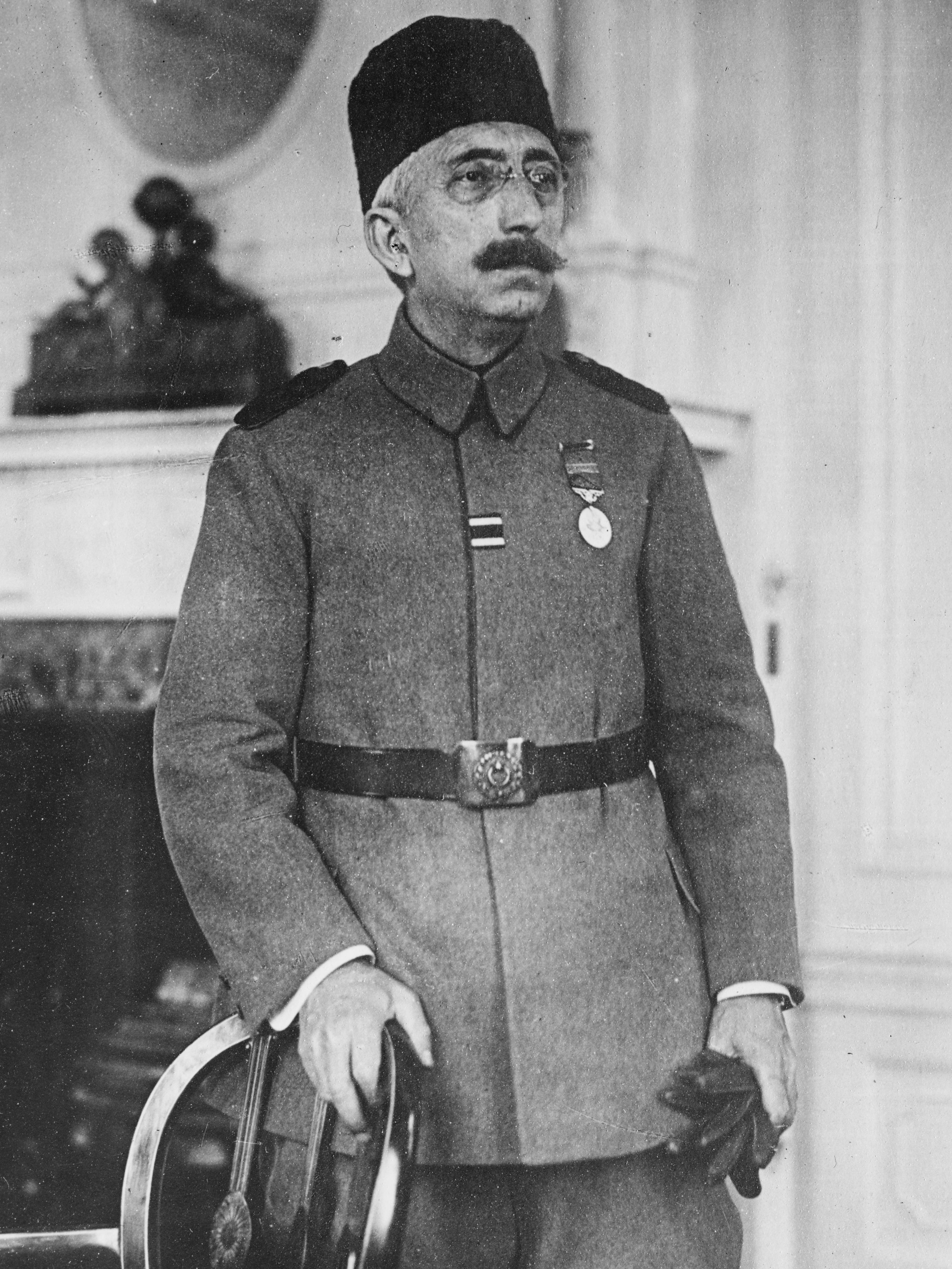
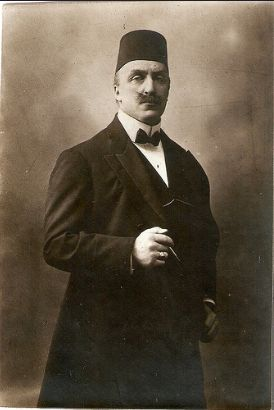
Süleyman Şâh / Gündüz Âlp ( ?–1227)	?
Ertuğrul Gazi أرطغرل غازی (1227–1281)	Unknown
1. Osman Gazi عثمان غازى; 1281-1326	Malhun Hatun (unclear)
2. Orhan Gazi اورخان غازی; 1326-1359	Nilüfer Hatun
3. Murad I مراد اول خداوندگار; 1359-1389	Gül-Çiçek Hatun
4. Bayezid I ییلدیرم بايزيد الأول; 1389-1403	Devlet Hatun
5. Mehmed I چلبی محمد; 1413-1421	Emine; Valide Hatun
6. Murad II مراد ثانى; 1421-1451	Hadice Âlime; Hümâ; Valide Hatun
7. Mehmed II محمد الثانى الفاتح; 1451-1481	Emîne; Gül-Bahar; Valide Hatun (Own mother) & Sitt-î; Mükrîme Hatun (Stepmother)
8. Bayezid II بايزيد ثانى; 1481-1512	Gül-Bahar Hatun (Own mother) & Ayşe Hatun (Stepmother)
9. Selim I سليم الأول; 1512-1520 The First; Ottoman Caliph (1517-1520)	Hafîze (Ayşe Hafsa); Vâlide Sultân
10. Suleiman I القانونى سليمان; 1520-1566	Hürrem; Haseki Sultân خرم سلطان
11. Selim II سليم ثانى; 1566-1574	Afîfe Nûr-Banû; Vâlide Sultân
12. Murad III مراد ثالث; 1574-1595	Sâfiye; Vâlide Sultân
Handan; Vâlide Sultân	13. Mehmed III محمد ثالث; 1595-1603	Hâlime / Fûl-Dâne; Vâlide Sultân
Mâhirûze Hadice; Vâlide Sultân ماہ فروز خاتون	14. Ahmed I احمد اول; 1603-1617	Mâh-Peyker; Kösem; Vâlide Sultân كوسم سلطان	15. Mustafa I مصطفى اول; 1617-1618; 1622-1623
16. Osman II عثمان ثانى; 1618-1622	17. Murad IV مراد رابع; 1623-1640	Turhan Hatice; Vâlide Sultân تورخان سلطان	18. Ibrahim ابراهيم اول; 1640-1648	Sâliha; Dil-Âşûb; Vâlide Sultân صالحه دل اشوب سلطان	Hatice Mû'azzez; Second Haseki; Sultân معزز سلطان
Meh-Pâre; Ummetullah (Emetullah); Râbi'a Gül-Nûş; Vâlide Sultân رابعه کلنوش سلطان	19. Mehmed IV محمد رابع; 1648-1687; Vak'a-i Vakvakiye: 26 February 1656	20. Suleiman II سليمان ثانى; 1687-1691	21. Ahmed II احمد ثانى; 1691-1695
Sâliha Sebkat-î; Vâlide Sultân صالحه سلطان	22. Mustafa II مصطفى ثانى; 1695-1703; Edirne Vak'ası: 15 July 1703 - 22 August 1703	Şâh-Süvar; Vâlide Sultân شھسوار سلطان	Emine; Mihr-î-Şâh; Second; Kadın Efendi امینه مھرشاہ قادین	23. Ahmed III احمد ثالث; 1703-1730; Patrona Halil; Rebellion: 28 September 1730	Râbi'a Şerm-î; Kadın Efendi رابعہ شرمی قادین
24. Mahmud I محمود اول; 1730-1754	25. Osman III عثمان ثالث; 1754-1757	Mihr-î-Şâh; Vâlide Sultân مھرشاہ سلطان	26. Mustafa III مصطفى ثالث; 1757-1774	Ayşe; Sine-Pervar (Seniyeperver); Vâlide Sultân عایشه سینه پرور سلطان	27. Abdul Hamid I عبد الحميد اول; 1774-1789	Nakş-î-Dil; Vâlide Sultân نقش دل سلطان
28. Selim III سليم ثالث; 1789-1807; Kabakçı Mustafa; İsyanı: 25 May 1807	29. Mustafa IV مصطفى رابع; 1807-1808	Bezm-î Âlem; Vâlide Sultân	30. Mahmud II محمود ثانى; 1808-1839; Vak'a-i Hayriye: 16 June 1826	Pertav-Nihâl (Pertevniyâl); Vâlide Sultân
Şevk-Efzâ; Vâlide Sultân	Tîr-î-Müjgan; Third; Kadın Efendi (Own mother) & Rahîme Pîristû; Vâlide Sultân (Adoptive mother)	31. Abdulmejid I عبد المجيد اول; 1839-1861	Gül-Cemâl; Fourth; Kadın Efendi	Gül-İstü (Gülistan Münire); Forrth; Kadın Efendi	32. Abdulaziz عبد العزيز; 1861-1876	Hayrân-î-Dil; Kadın Efendi
33. Murad V مراد خامس; 1876	34. Abdul Hamid II عبد الحميد ثانی; 31 August 1876 - 27 Nisan 1909; First Meşrûtiyyet: 23 November 1876 - 13 February 1878; Second Meşrûtiyyet: 3 July 1908; 31 March Vak'ası: 13 April 1909	35. Mehmed V محمد خامس; 1909-1918; Çanakkale Savaşı: 18 March 1915	36. Mehmed VI محمد سادس; 4 July 1918 - 18 November 1922; Moudros armistice: 30 October 1918; Istanbul's; Occupation: 13 November 1918; Treaty of Sèvres: 10 August 1920; Abolition of the Ottoman Sultanate: 1 November 1922	Abdulmejid II عبد المجيد الثانى; 18 November 1922 - Caliphate's Abolition: 3 March 1924

|

Ottoman Imperial Standard, late 19th and early 20th century

== List of heirs since 1922 ==
The Ottoman dynasty was expelled from Turkey in 1924 and most members took on the surname Osmanoğlu, meaning "son of Osman". The female members of the dynasty were allowed to return after 1951, and the male members after 1973. Below is a list of people who would have been heirs to the Ottoman throne following the abolition of the sultanate on 1 November 1922. These people have not necessarily made any claim to the throne; for example, Ertuğrul Osman said "Democracy works well in Turkey."

Name	Title	Claim	Period	Duration
Mehmed VI	Last Ottoman Sultan and Caliph (1918–1922); 36th Head of the House of Osman (1922–1926)	Son of Sultan Abdulmejid I, grandson of Sultan Mahmud II, younger brother of Murad V, Abdul Hamid II and Mehmed V.	4 July 1918 – 16 May 1926 (including reign as Sultan)	7 years, 316 days
Abdulmejid II	Last Ottoman Caliph (1922–1924); 37th Head of the House of Osman following Mehmed VI's death (1926–1944)	First cousin of Mehmed VI, son of Sultan Abdülaziz.	16 May 1926 – 23 August 1944	18 years, 99 days
Ahmed Nihad	38th Head of the House of Osman (1944–1954)	First cousin twice removed of Abdulmejid II, grandson of Sultan Murad V.	23 August 1944 – 4 June 1954	9 years, 285 days
Osman Fuad	39th Head of the House of Osman (1954–1973)	Younger half-brother of Ahmed Nihad, grandson of Sultan Murad V.	4 June 1954 – 19 May 1973	18 years, 349 days
Mehmed Abdulaziz	40th Head of the House of Osman (1973–1977)	Second cousin twice removed of Osman Fuad, grandson of Sultan Abdülaziz.	19 May 1973 – 19 January 1977	3 years, 245 days
Ali Vâsib	41st Head of the House of Osman (1977–1983)	Second cousin twice removed of Mehmed Abdulaziz, great-grandson of Sultan Murad V.	19 January 1977 – 9 December 1983	6 years, 324 days
Mehmed Orhan	42nd Head of the House of Osman (1983–1994)	Second cousin once removed of Ali Vâsib, grandson of Sultan Abdul Hamid II.	9 December 1983 – 12 March 1994	10 years, 93 days
Ertuğrul Osman	43rd Head of the House of Osman (1994–2009)	First cousin of Mehmed Orhan, grandson of Sultan Abdul Hamid II.	12 March 1994 – 23 September 2009	15 years, 195 days
Bayezid Osman	44th Head of the House of Osman (2009–2017)	Second cousin of Ertuğrul Osman, great-grandson of Sultan Mehmed V.	23 September 2009 – 6 January 2017	7 years, 105 days
Dündar Ali Osman	45th Head of the House of Osman (2017–2021)	Second cousin once removed of Bayezid Osman, great-grandson of Sultan Abdul Hamid II.	6 January 2017 – 18 January 2021	4 years, 12 days
Harun Osman	46th Head of the House of Osman (2021–present)	Younger brother of Dündar Ali Osman, great-grandson of Sultan Abdul Hamid II.	18 January 2021 – present	5 years, 294 days

=== Family tree, showing relationships among the heads of the Ottoman dynasty since 1922 ===
- Mahmud II (1785–1839; 30th Sultan and 23rd Ottoman Caliph: 1808–1839)
  - Abdulmejid I (1823–1861; 31st Sultan and 24th Ottoman Caliph: 1839–1861)
    - Murad V (1840–1904; 33rd Sultan and 26th Ottoman Caliph: 1876)
      - Şehzade Mehmed Selaheddin (1861–1915)
        - Ahmed Nihad (1883–1954; 38th Head of the House of Osman: 1944–1954)
          - Ali Vâsib (1903–1983; 41st Head of the House of Osman: 1977–1983)
        - Osman Fuad (1895–1973; 39th Head of the House of Osman: 1954–1973)
    - Abdul Hamid II (1842–1918; 34th Sultan and 27th Ottoman Caliph: 1876–1909)
      - Şehzade Mehmed Selim (1870–1937)
        - Şehzade Mehmed Abdülkerim (1906–1935)
          - Dündar Ali Osman (1930–2021): 45th Head of the House of Osman: 2017–2021)
          - Harun Osman (born 1932): 46th Head of the House of Osman: (2021–present)
      - Şehzade Mehmed Abdülkadir (1878–1944)
        - Mehmed Orhan (1909–1994; 42nd Head of the House of Osman: 1983–1994)
      - Şehzade Mehmed Burhaneddin (1885–1949)
        - Ertuğrul Osman (1912–2009; 43rd Head of the House of Osman: 1994–2009)
    - Mehmed V (1844–1918; 35th Sultan and 28th Ottoman Caliph: 1909–1918)
    - Şehzade Mehmed Burhaneddin (1849–1876)
      - Şehzade Ibrahim Tevfik (1874–1931)
        - Bayezid Osman (1924–2017; 44th Head of the House of Osman: 2009–2017)
    - Mehmed VI Vahideddin (1861–1926; 36th and last Sultan and 29th Ottoman Caliph: 1918–1922; 36th Head of the House of Osman: 1922–1926)
  - Abdulaziz (1830–1876; 32nd Sultan and 25th Ottoman Caliph: 1861–1876)
    - Abdulmejid II (1868–1944; 30th and last Ottoman Caliph: 1922–1924; 37th Head of the House of Osman: 1926–1944)
    - Şehzade Mehmed Seyfeddin (1874–1927)
      - Mehmed Abdulaziz (1901–1977; 40th Head of the House of Osman: 1973–1977)

== See also ==
- Ottoman family tree (simplified)
- Ottoman family tree
- Turkic history
- Amuca tribe
- Osmanoğlu family, its current form
- List of admirals in the Ottoman Empire
- List of sultans of the Ottoman Empire
- List of Ottoman imperial consorts
- List of mothers of the Ottoman sultans
- List of Valide hatuns
- List of Valide sultans
- List of Ottoman princesses
- List of Ottoman grand viziers
- List of Kapudan Pashas
- Tughra
- Ottoman Empire
- Kadın (title)

== Notes ==
— Imperial house — House of Osman
New Dynasty Empire founded	Ruling house of the Ottoman Empire c. 1299 – 19 November 1922	Vacant Monarchy and Caliphate abolished
Preceded by ‘Abbāsid dynasty	Caliphate dynasty 1517 – 3 March 1924	Vacant Monarchy and Caliphate abolished
