= Dündar Ali Osman =

Head of the Osmanoğlu family (1930–2021)

Dündar Ali Osman Osmanoğlu

Head of the Osmanoğlu family
- Tell: 6 January 2017 – 18 January 2021
- Predecessor: Şehzade Bayezid Osman
- Successor: Şehzade Harun Osman
- Born: Dündar Ali Osman; 30 December 1930; Damascus, Syria
- Died: 18 January 2021 (aged 90); Damascus, Syria
- Spouse: Yüsra Hanım
- House: Imperial House of Osman
- Father: Şehzade Mehmed Abdülkerim
- Mother: Nimet Hanım
- Religion: Sunni Islam

Dündar Ali Osman (Turkish pronunciation: [dynˈdaɾ ˈali ˈosman], Ottoman Turkish: دوندار علي عثمان, romanized: Dundār ʿAli ʿOsmān; 30 December 1930 – 18 January 2021), also known as Dündar Ali Osman Osmanoğlu with a surname as required by the Republic of Turkey, or by the Ottoman imperial name Şehzade Dündar Ali Osman Osmanoğlu Efendi, was the 45th Head of the House of Osman, which ruled the Ottoman Empire from 1299 until the abolition of the Sultanate in 1922.

== Early and personal life ==
Dündar Ali Osman Osmanoğlu was born on 30 December, 1930, in Damascus, Syria. He was a great-grandson of Ottoman Sultan Abdul Hamid II. His grandfather was Şehzade Mehmed Selim and his father was Şehzade Mehmed Abdülkerim. He had a full-brother, Harun, born in 1932. Osmanoğlu was married to Yüsra Hanım and was childless. She died on 25 July, 2017, in Damascus.

== Later life and death ==
In 1974, the Ottoman family was allowed to return to Turkey. However, Osmanoğlu refused to migrate and stayed in Damascus in Syria, even though most of the family members returned to Istanbul.

The Syrian Civil War broke out in 2011, and media reports emerged in 2013 that Osmanoğlu was stranded in Syria. In August 2017, he was evacuated on the order of Recep Tayyip Erdoğan, the president of Turkey. Osmanoğlu was initially evacuated to Beirut in Lebanon. Later, he moved to Istanbul.

Dündar Ali Osman died on 18 January, 2021, in Damascus at the age of 90 and was succeeded by his brother Şehzade Harun Osman as the head of the house.

== See also ==
- Line of succession to the former Ottoman throne

Dündar Ali Osman House of Osman Born: 30 December 1930 Died: 18 January 2021
Preceded by Bayezid Osman	Head of the Osmanoğlu family 6 January 2017 – 18 January 2021	Succeeded by Harun Osman
