= Üsküdar =

- District and municipality
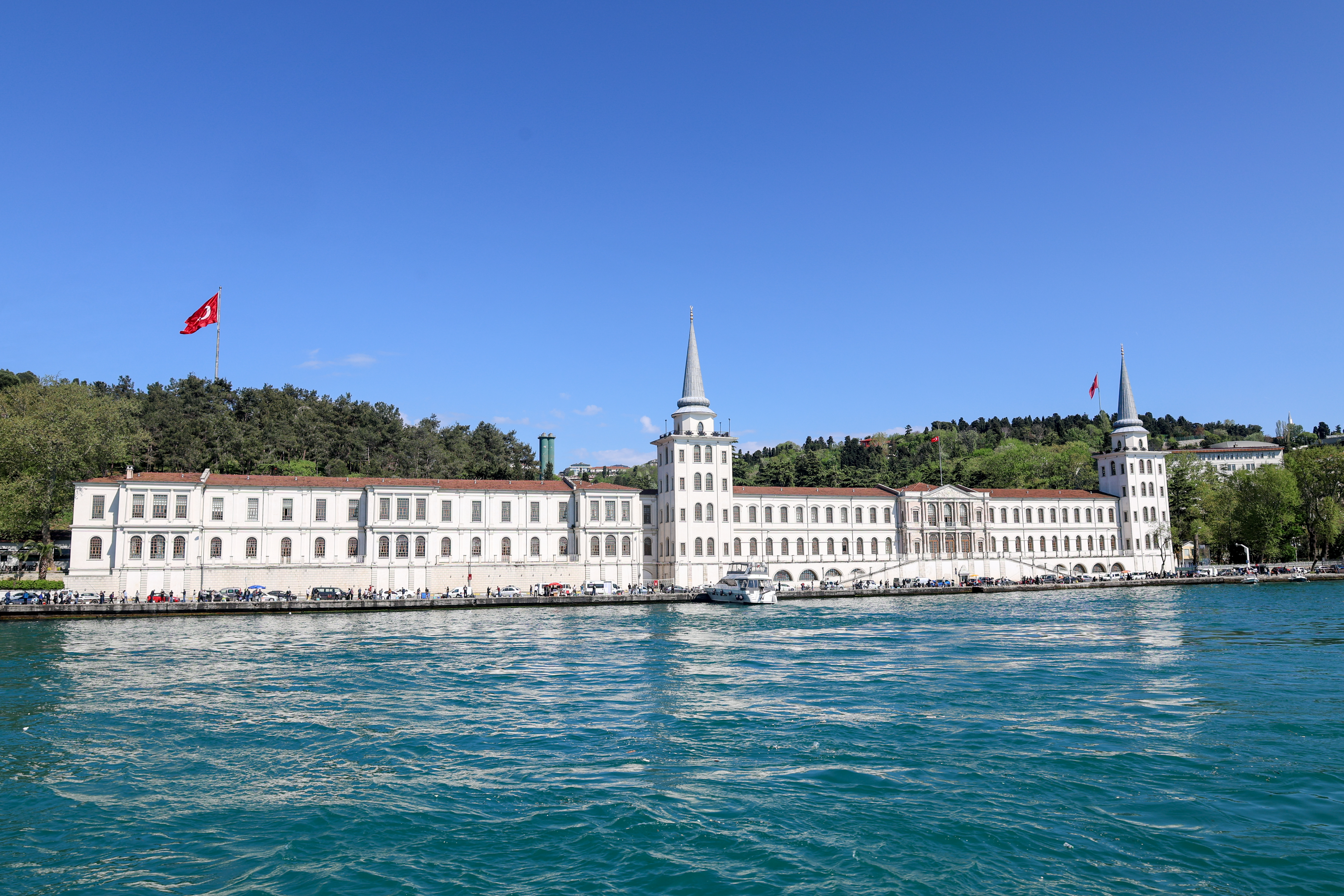
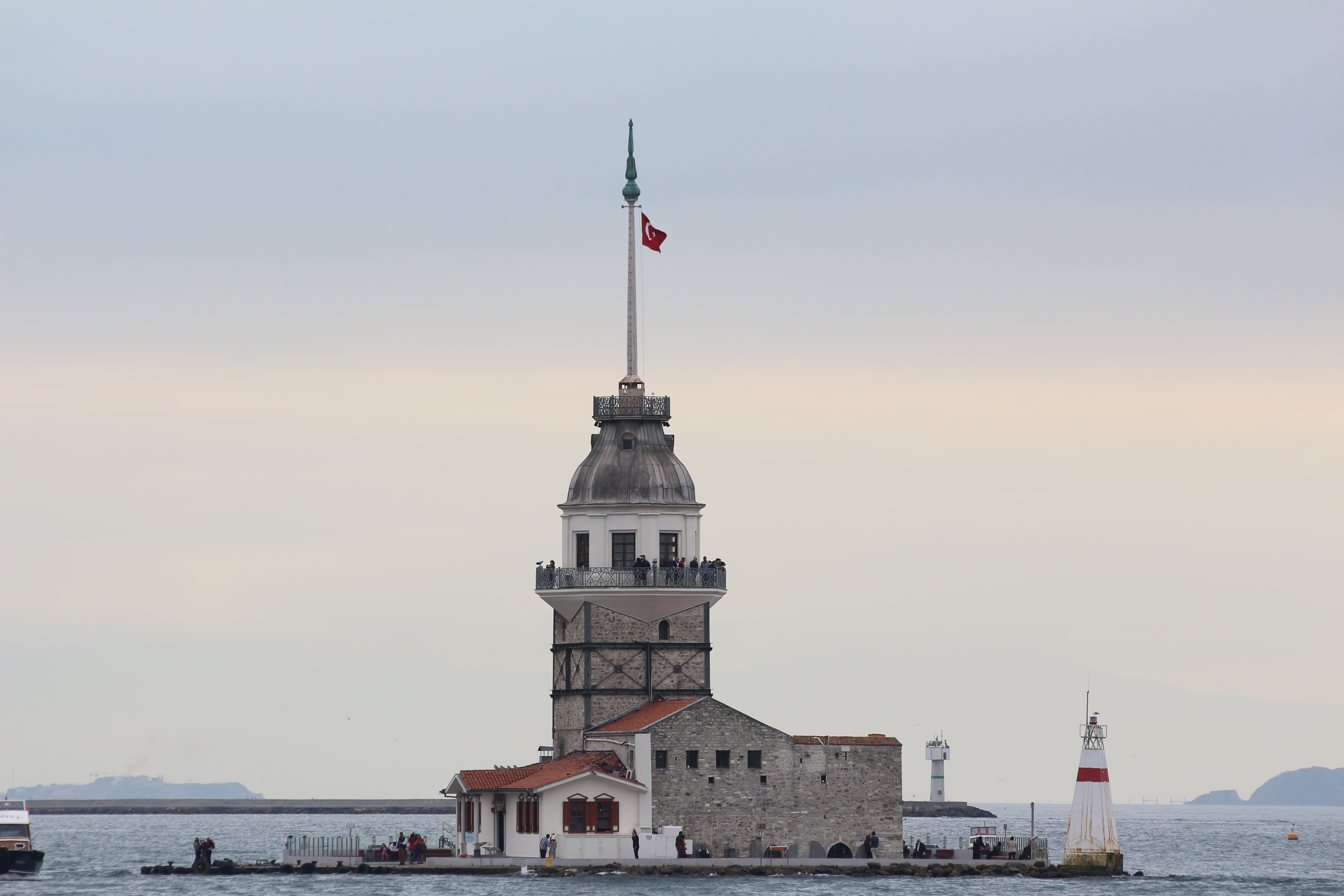
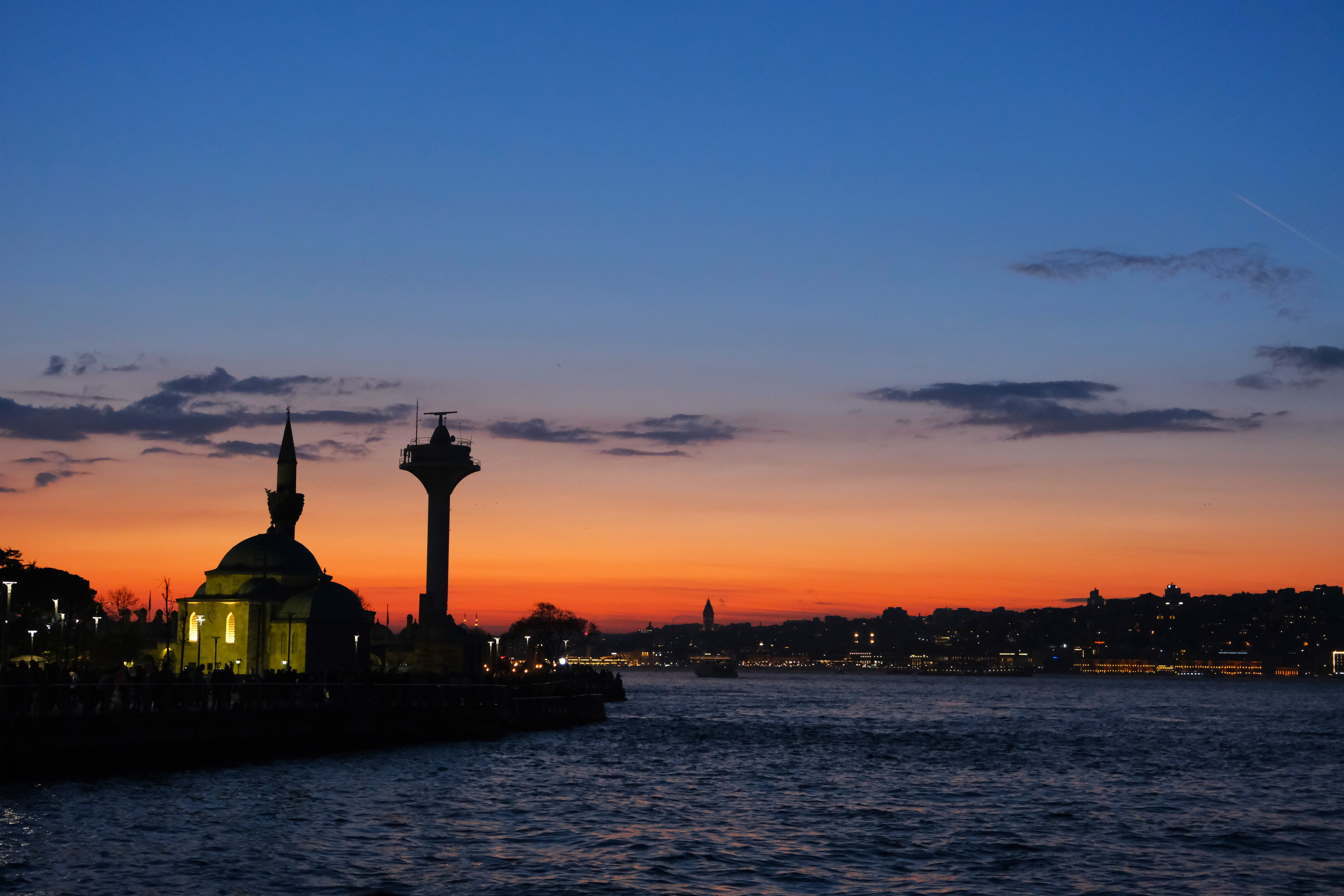
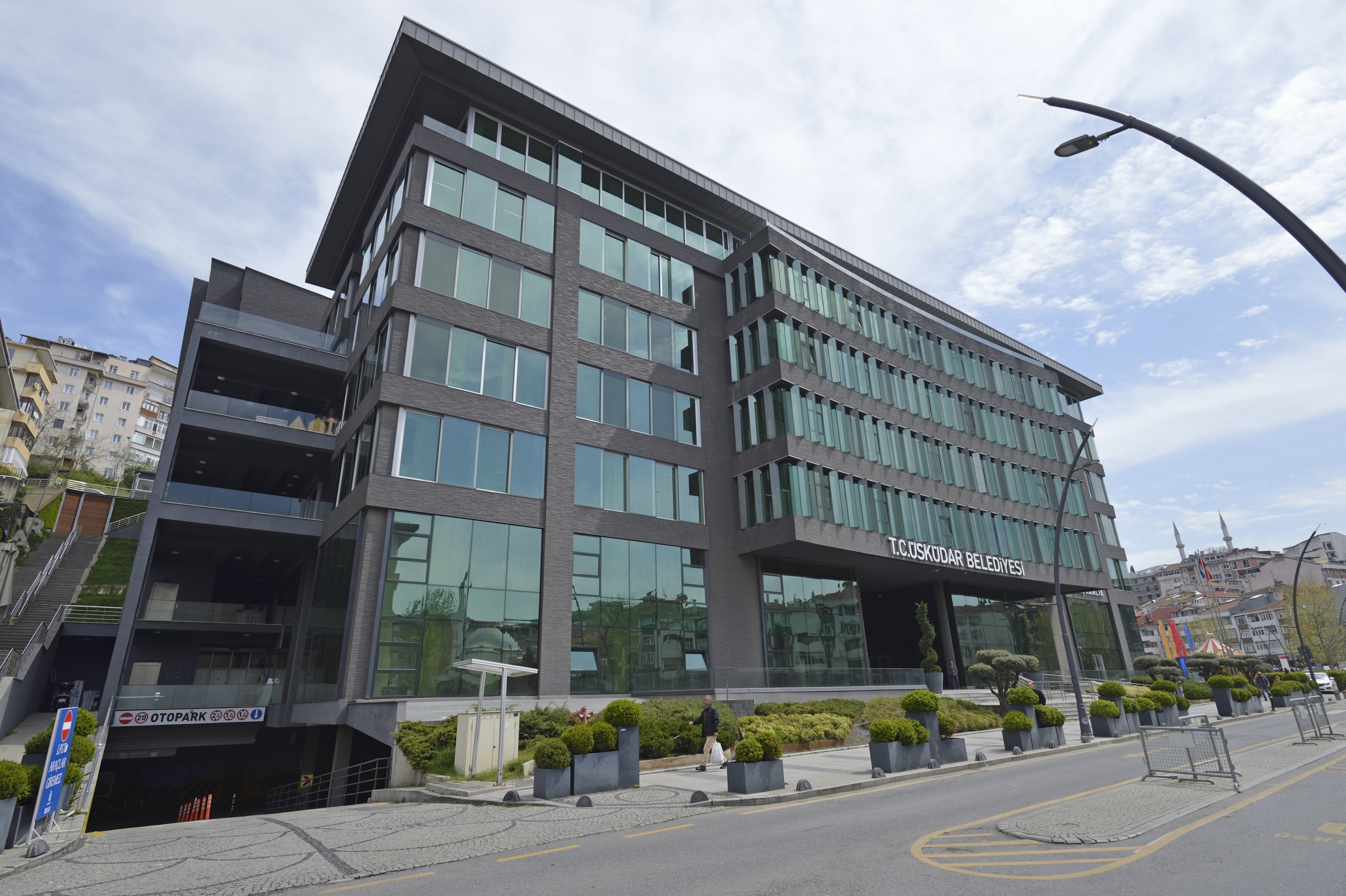
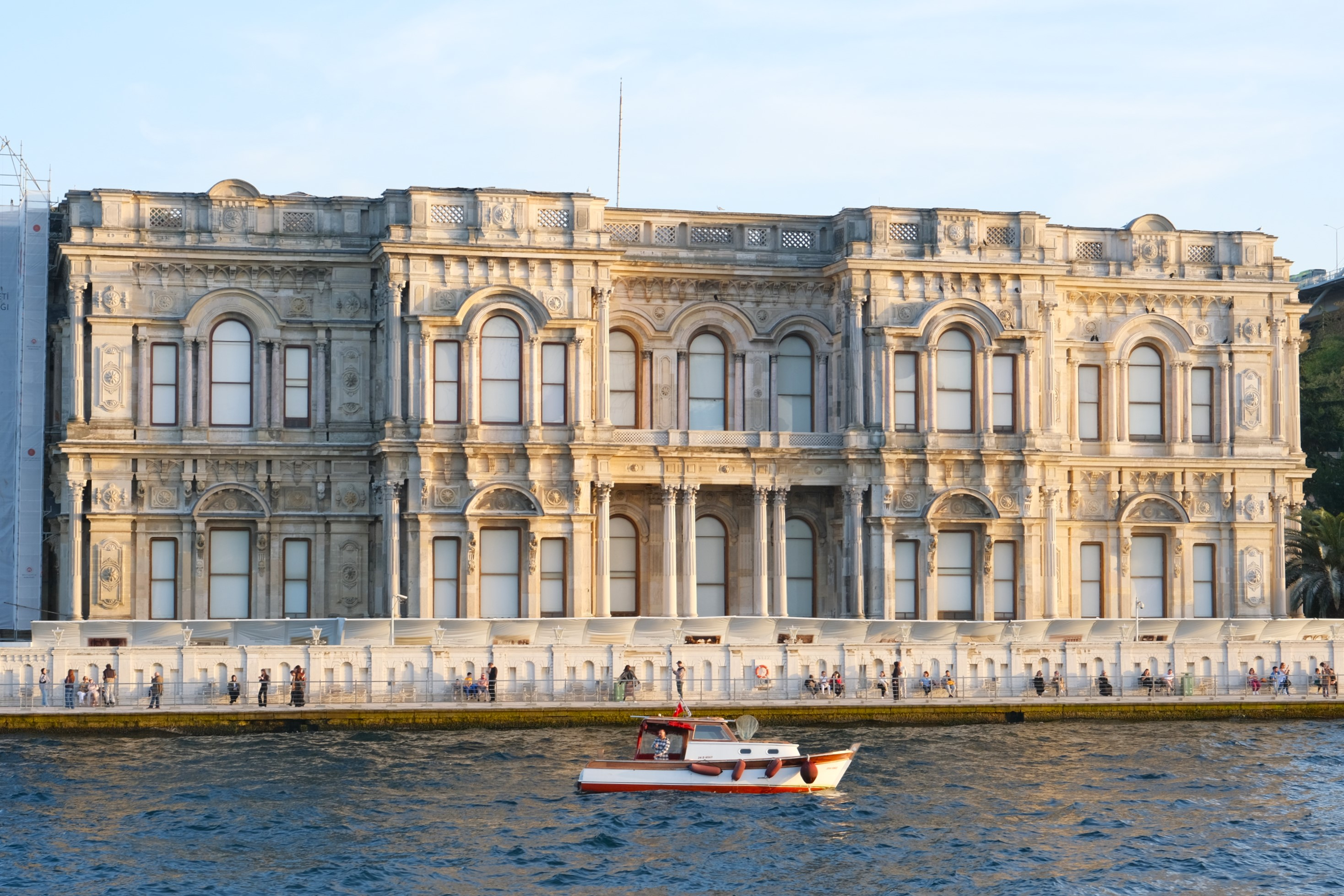
- Clockwise from top: Kuleli Military High School, Şemsi Pasha Mosque and sunset, Beylerbeyi Palace, Üsküdar Municipality Building and Maiden's Tower

- Logo

- Map showing Üsküdar District in Istanbul Province

- Location within Turkey Location within Istanbul
- Coordinates: 41°01′26″N 29°00′59″E
- Country: Turkey
- Province: Istanbul

Government
  - Mayor: Vacant
- Area: 35 km^{2} (14 sq mi)
- Population (2022): 524,452
  - Density: 15,000/km^{2} (39,000/sq mi)
- Time zone: UTC+3 (TRT)
- Area code: 0216
- Website: www.uskudar.bel.tr

Üsküdar (Turkish pronunciation: [ysˈcydaɾ]) is a municipality and district of Istanbul Province, Turkey. Its area is 35 km^{2}, and its population is 524,452 (2022). It is a large and densely populated district on the Anatolian (Asian) shore of the Bosphorus. It is bordered to the north by Beykoz, to the east by Ümraniye, to the southeast by Ataşehir and to the south by Kadıköy; with Karaköy, Kabataş, Beşiktaş, and the historic Sarayburnu quarter of Fatih facing it on the opposite shore to the west. Üsküdar has been a conservative cultural center of the Anatolian side of Istanbul since Ottoman times with its landmark as well as numerous tiny mosques and dergahs.

Previously known as Chrysopolis and Scutari, present-day Üsküdar is a major transport hub, with ferries to Eminönü, Karaköy, Kabataş, Beşiktaş and some of the Bosphorus suburbs. Üsküdar is a stop on the Marmaray rail service at the point where it starts its journey under the Bosphorus, re-emerging on the European side at Sirkeci. Via Marmaray, Üsküdar is linked to Gebze on the Asian side of the city and Halkali on the European side. Üsküdar is also a stop on the M5 Metro line to Çekmeköy. Buses run along the Bosphorus shore all the way up north to Anadolu Kavağı in Beykoz district. A bus service also operates to the summer town of Şile on the Black Sea.

== Etymology ==
Üsküdar was previously called Chrysopolis (Greek: Χρυσόπολις, 'Golden City') and later Skoutarion (Byzantine Greek: Σκουτάριον) during the Byzantine Empire. This may commemorate the leather scutum shields used by guards since the word scutari means 'raw tanned leather'. Invading Persians, Slavic tribes, Arabs, and Crusaders called the city Esküdar or Escutaire.

== Administration ==
From 2004 to 2024, Üsküdar was governed by the Justice and Development Party (AKP) and was seen as one of the party's strongholds in Istanbul. This changed in the 2024 local elections, when Sinem Dedetaş of the Republican People's Party (CHP) won the mayoralty, ending two decades of AKP rule in the district.

In July 2026, Dedetaş and several municipal officials were detained as part of an investigation into alleged irregularities in building and occupancy permits, part of a wider crackdown on opposition run municipalities. The CHP called the charges politically motivated; the government maintained that the judiciary was acting independently.

== History ==
=== Chrysopolis ===
Üsküdar was founded in the 7th century BC by ancient Greek colonists from Megara a few decades before Byzantium was founded on the opposite shore. It was originally called Chrysopolis (Ancient Greek: Χρυσόπολις, 'Golden City'). According to an ancient Greek geographer, the city received the name Chrysopolis because the Persian empire had a gold depository there or because it was associated with Agamemnon and Chryseis' son, Chryses. On the other hand, according to an 18th-century writer, it received the name because of the excellence of its harbor.

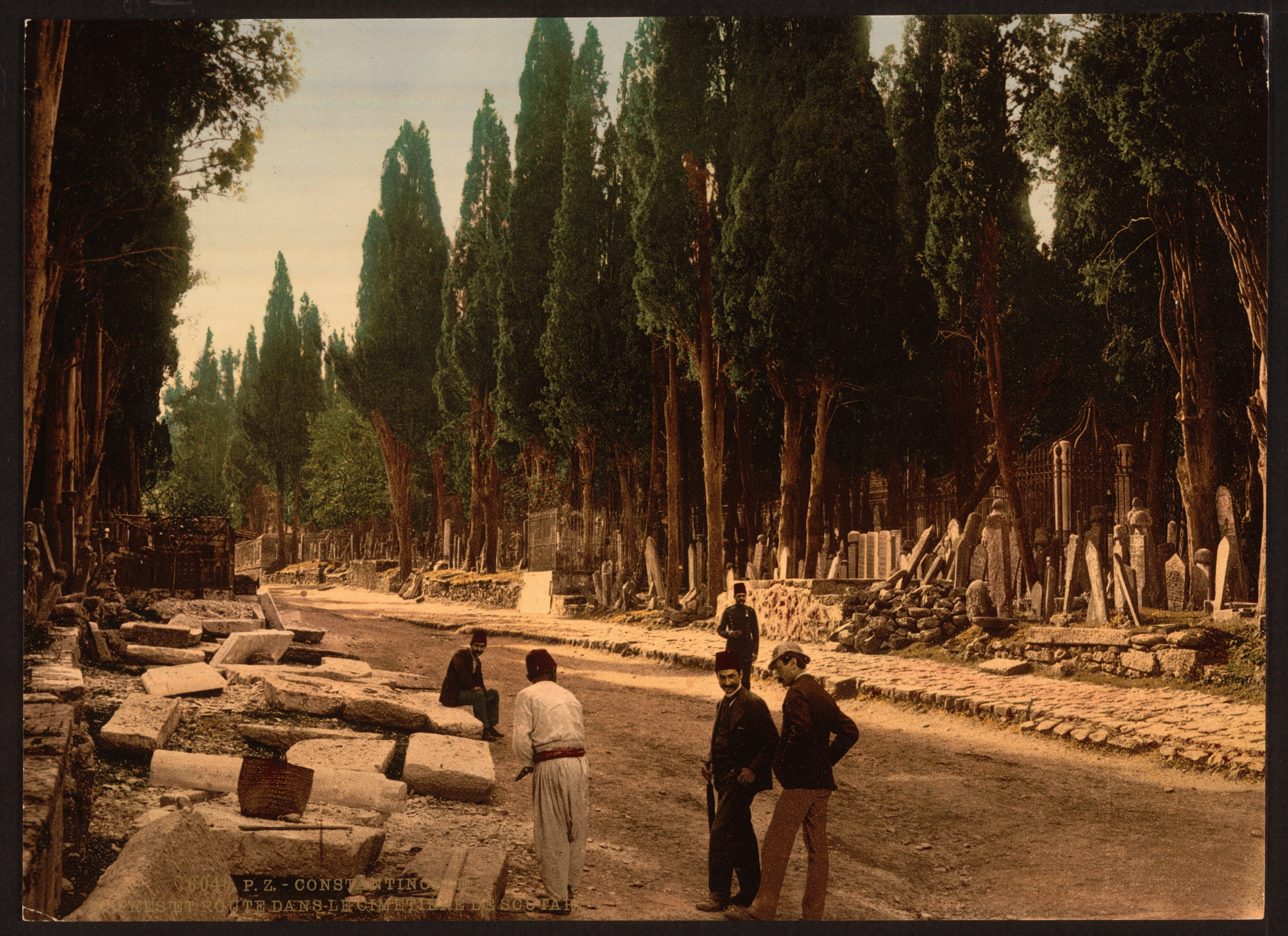
Cypresses and road leading to the cemetery, Scutari, Constantinople, Turkey. between 1890 - 1900.

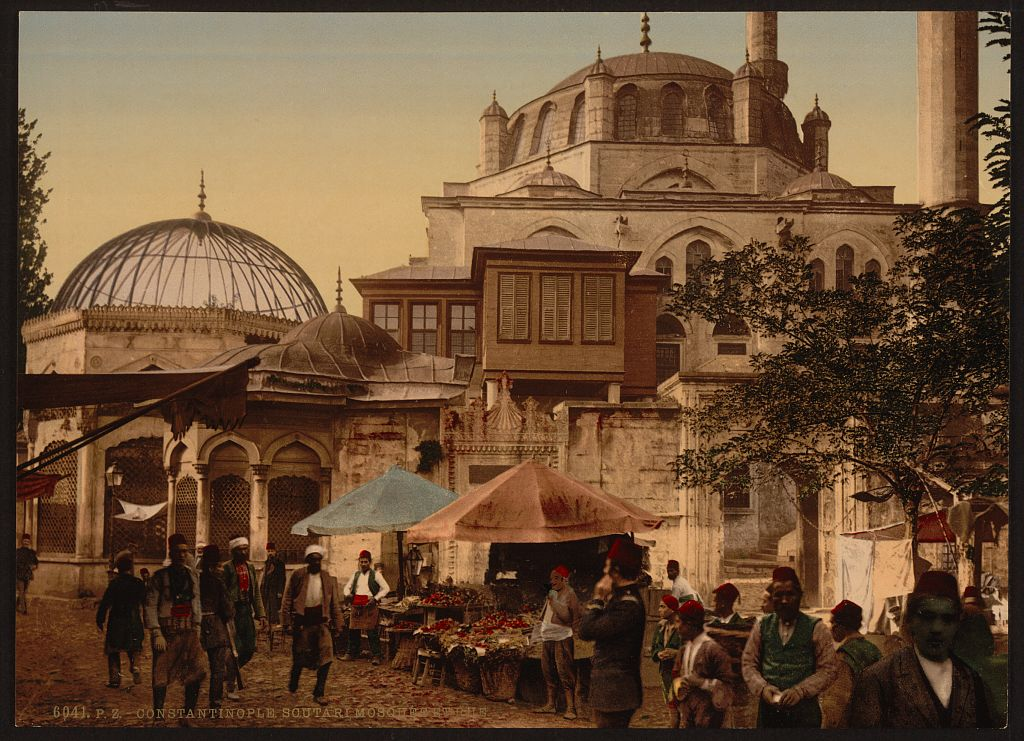
Mosque and street, Scutari, Constantinople, Turkey, [between ca. 1890 and ca. 1900].

The city was used as a harbor and shipyard and was an important staging post in the wars between the Greeks and Persians. In 410 BC Chrysopolis was taken by the Athenian general Alcibiades, and the Athenians used it thenceforth to charge a toll on ships coming from and going to the Black Sea. Long overshadowed by its neighbor Chalcedon during the Hellenistic and Roman period, it maintained its identity and increased its prosperity until it surpassed Chalcedon. Due to its less favorable location with respect to the currents of the Bosporus, however, it never surpassed Byzantium. In AD 324, the final battle between Constantine I, Emperor of the West, and Licinius, Emperor of the East, in which Constantine defeated Licinius, took place at Chrysopolis. When Constantine made Byzantium his capital, Chrysopolis, together with Chalcedon, became suburbs. Chrysopolis remained important throughout the Byzantine period because all trade routes to Asia started there, and all Byzantine army units headed to Asia mustered there. During the brief usurpation of the Armenian general Artabasdos, his eldest son, Niketas, was defeated with his forces at Chrysopolis by the army of Constantine V, before Artabasdos was finally deposed by the legitimate emperor Constantine and blinded. For this reason, and because of its location across from Constantinople, it was a natural target for anyone aiming at the capital. Also, in the 8th century AD it was taken by a small band of Arabs, who caused considerable destruction and panic in Constantinople, before withdrawing. In 988, a rebellion that nearly toppled Basil II began in Chrysopolis, before he was able to crush with the aid of Russian mercenaries.

=== Skoutarion, Scutari ===
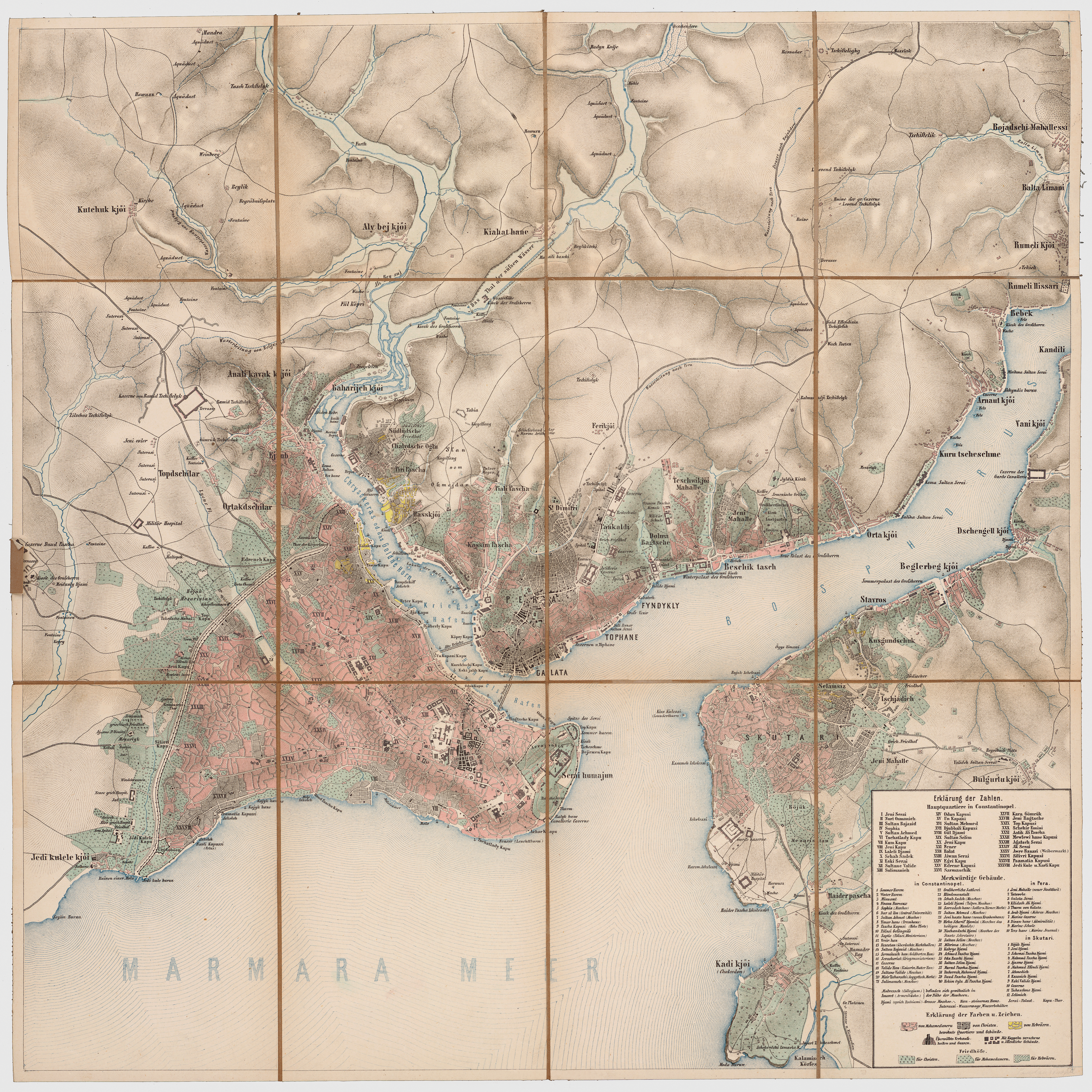
Under the Ottomans, Scutari was a large neighborhood with many cemeteries, across the water from Constantinople (map by Joseph von Scheda, 1860–70).

In the 12th century, the city changed its name to Skoutarion (Greek: Σκουτάριον), the name deriving from the Emperor's Skoutarion Palace nearby. In 1338 the Ottoman leader Orhan Gazi took Skoutarion, giving the Ottomans a base within sight of Constantinople for the first time. In the Ottoman period Üsküdar was one of the three communities outside the city walls of Constantinople (along with Eyüp and Galata). The area was a major burial ground, and today many large cemeteries remain, including Karacaahmet Mezarlığı, Bülbülderesi Mezarlığı, and a number of Jewish and Christian cemeteries. Karacaahmet Mezarlığı is one of Istanbul's largest cemeteries. The Bülbülderesi cemetery is next to Fevziye Hatun mosque.

During the WWI, Üsküdar suffered several times in 1918 due to the British bombing of İstanbul.

The neighborhood suffered during the ethnic-religious violence of the 6 September 1955, Istanbul pogrom. Turkish rioters looted Greek and Armenian Christian shops and many Greeks and Armenians subsequently fled the country.

Ottoman era paintings and drawings of Üsküdar

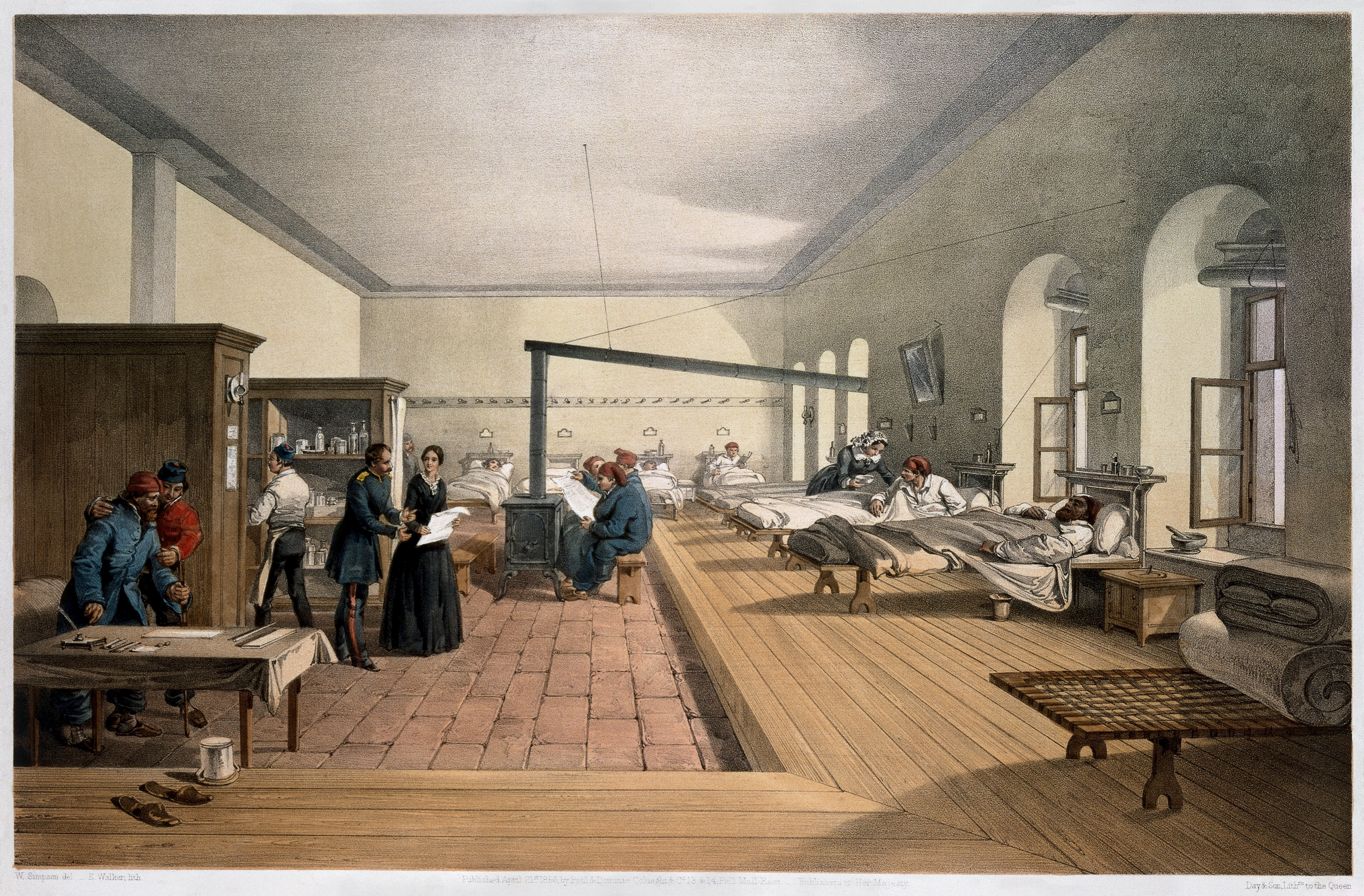
'One of the wards in the hospital at Scutari'.

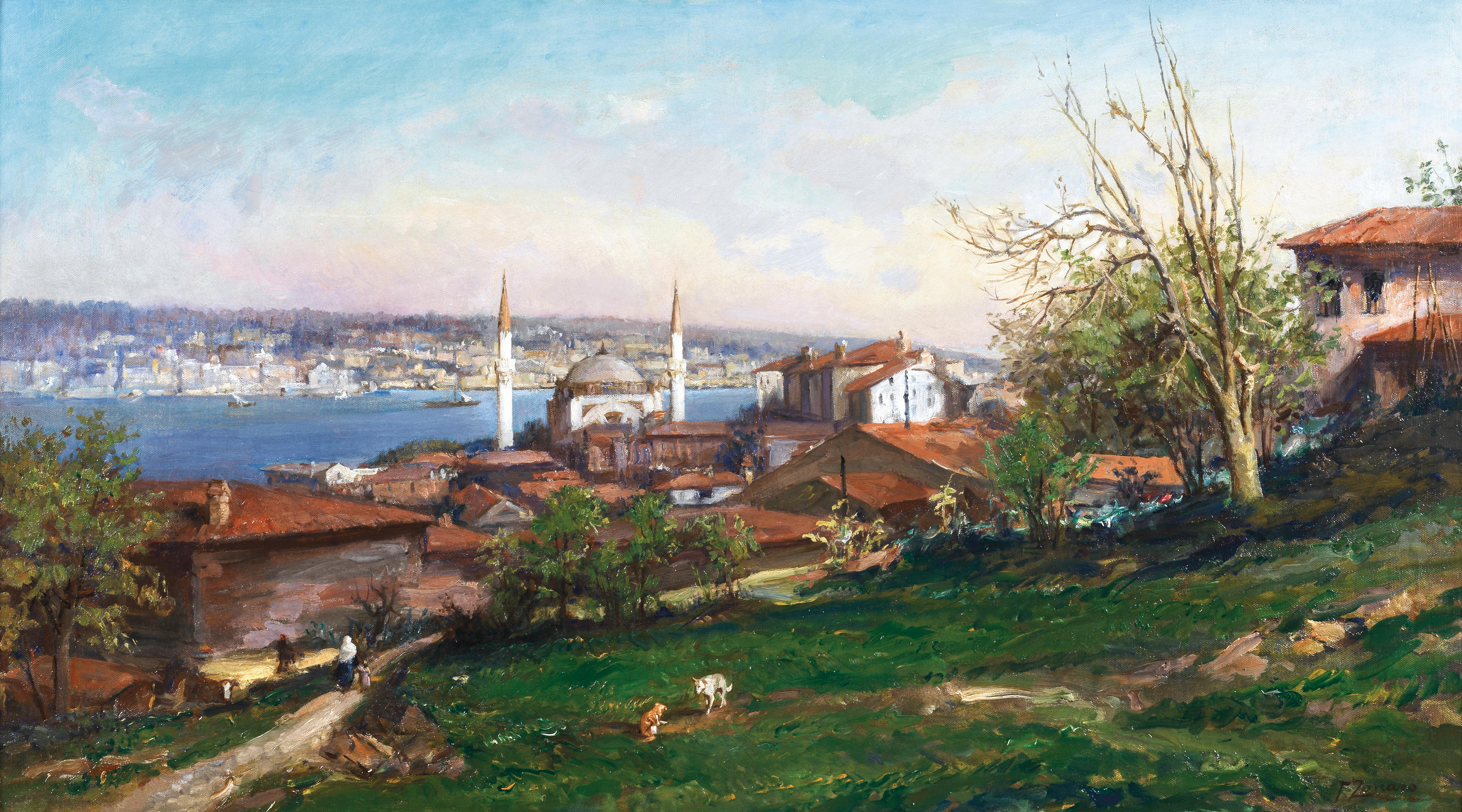
Fausto Zonaro İstanbul - Üsküdar, 1929

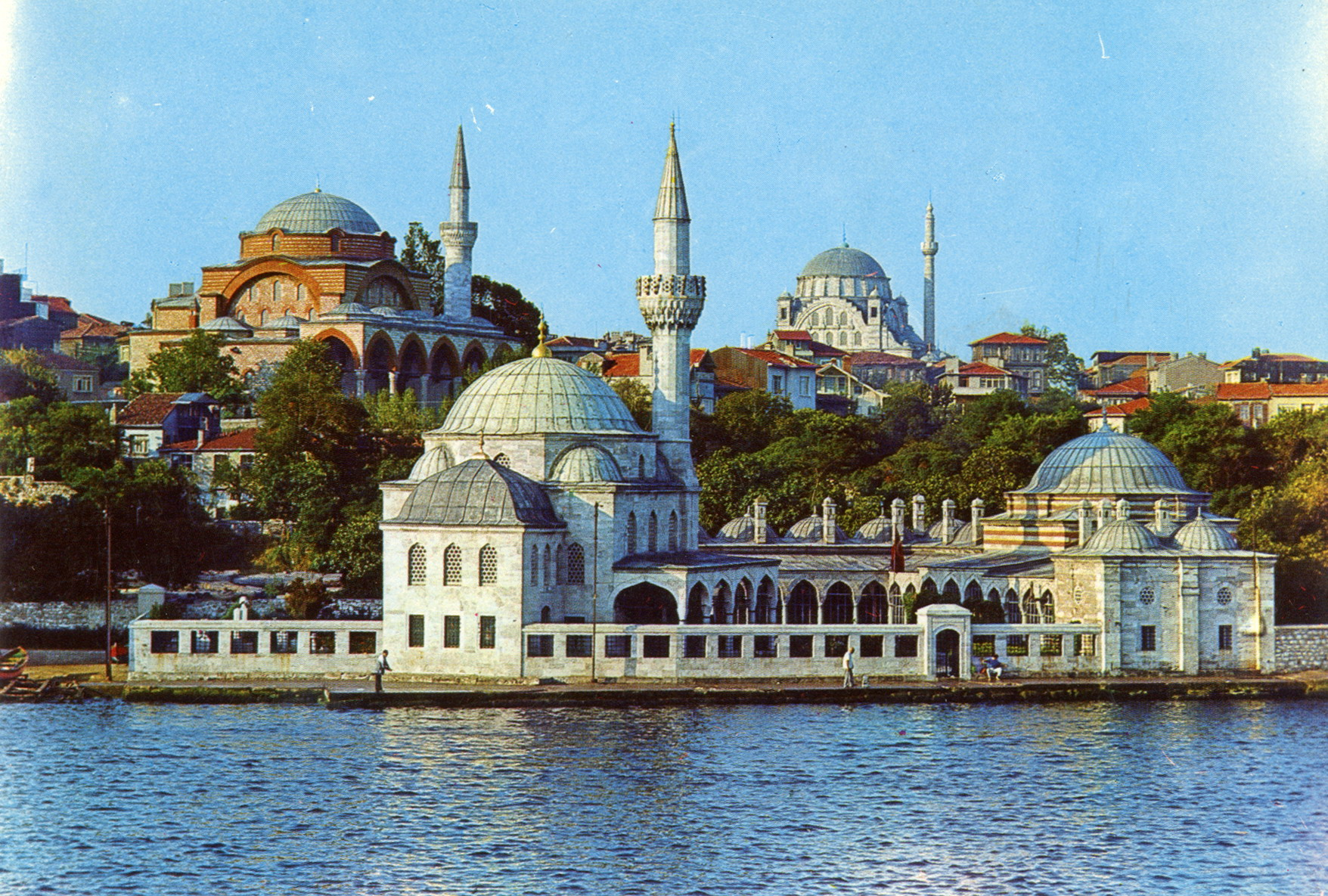
Şemsi Paşa Complex, Üsküdar, Istanbul.

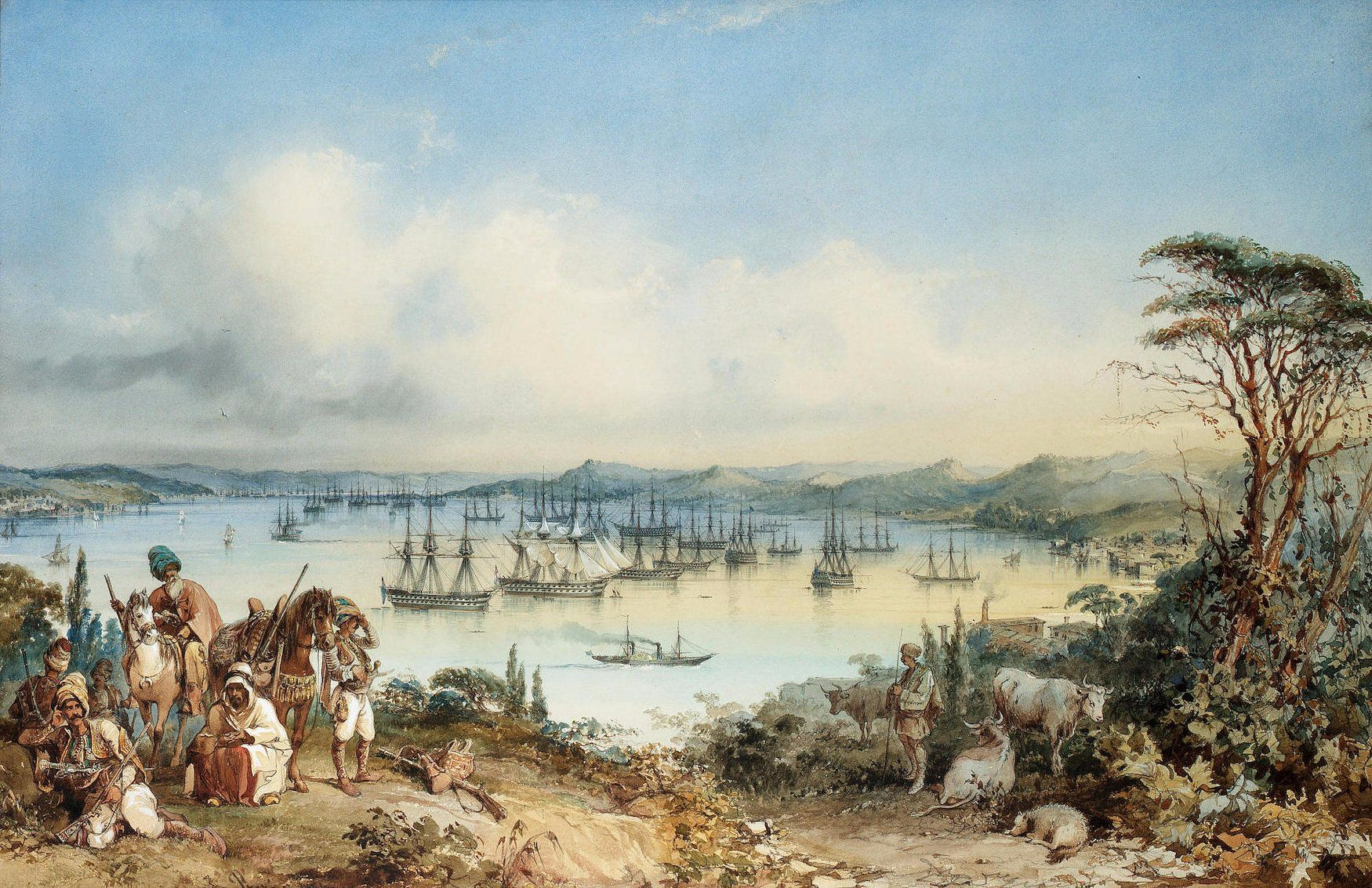
The Allied Fleets anchored in the Bosphorus, 1853.

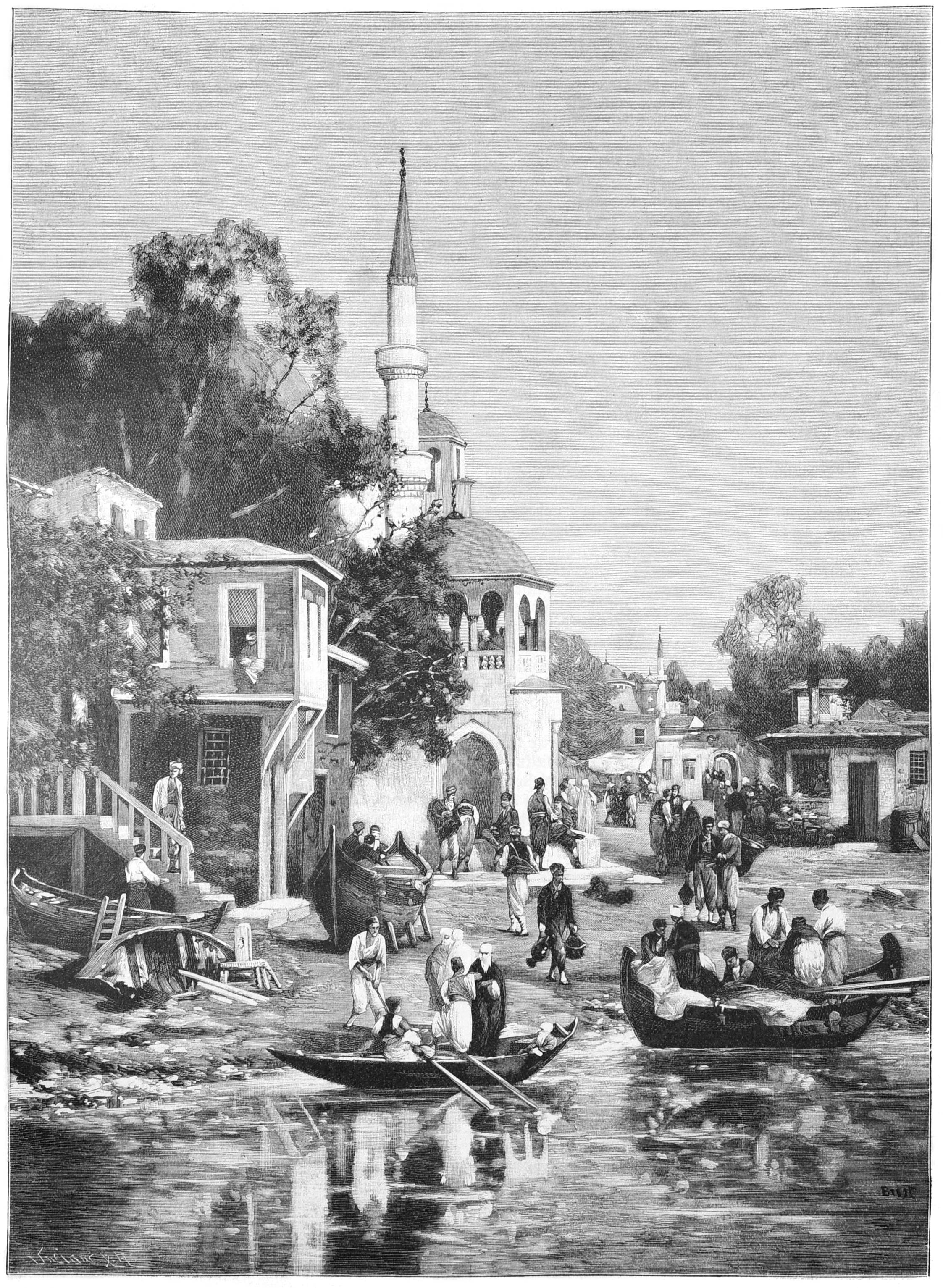
The Garden Arbor (1897)

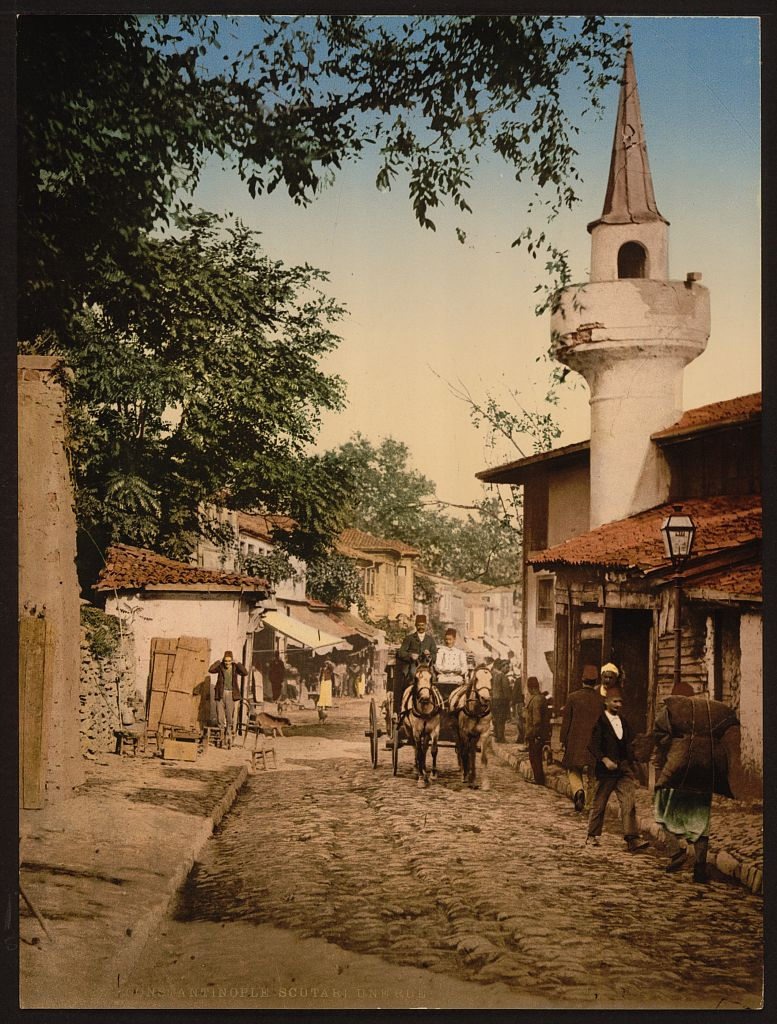
Scutari, Constantinople [between ca. 1890 and ca. 1900].

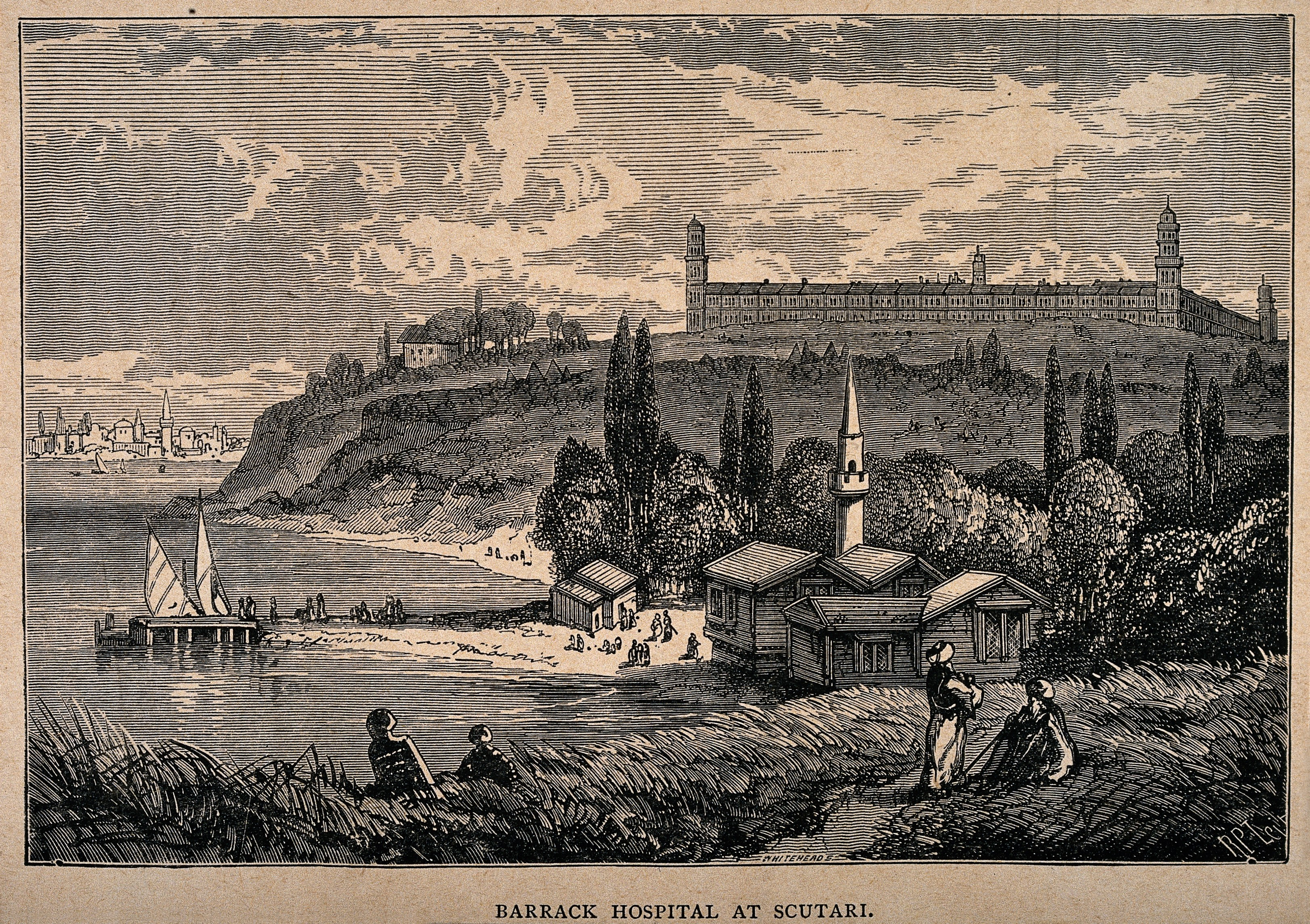
Crimean War, Turkey; panoramic view of the Barrack Hospital at Scutari

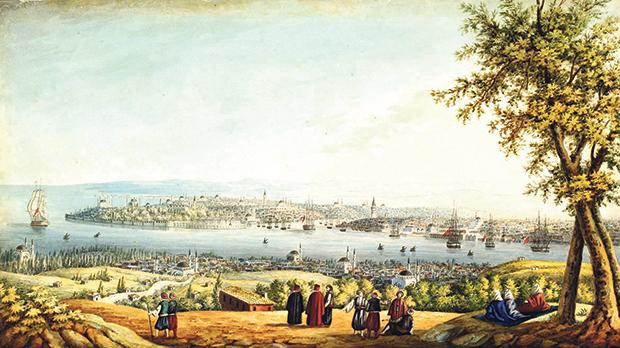
Margerita Schranz - View of the Bosphorus from above Scutari.

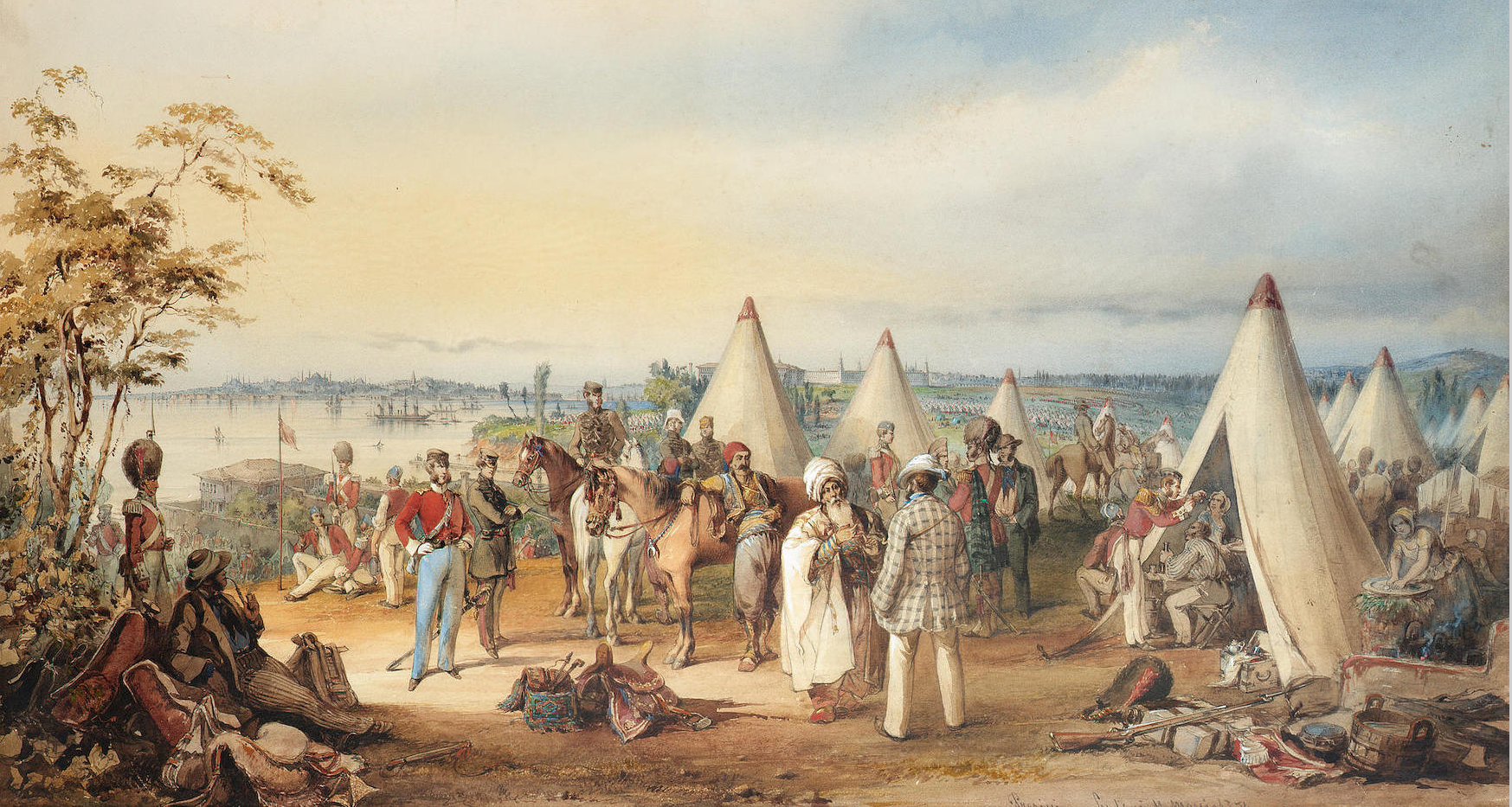
Vittorio Amedeo - The British army at Scutari, 1854.

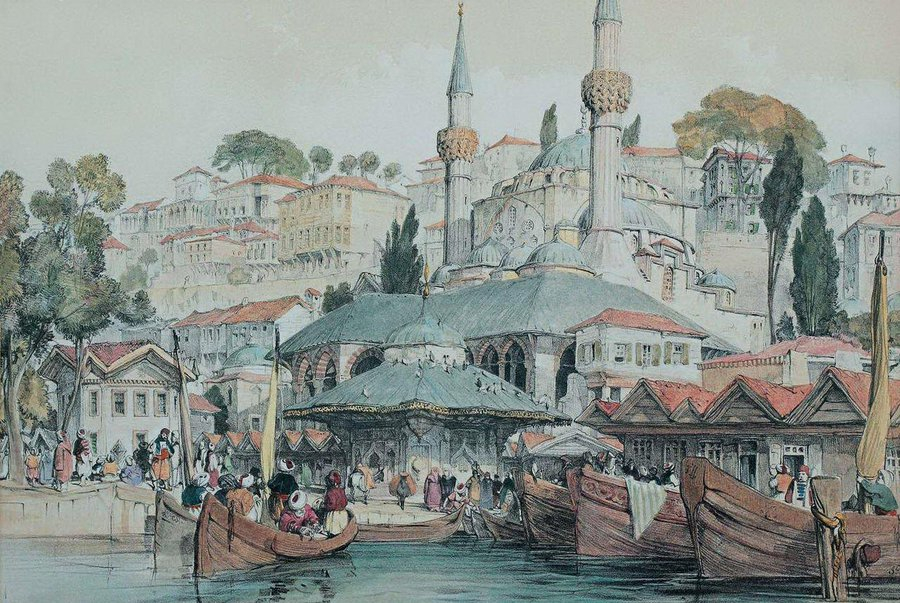
Üsküdar by English Orientalist painter John F. Lewis, Ottoman-Era, 1838.

=== Üsküdar today ===
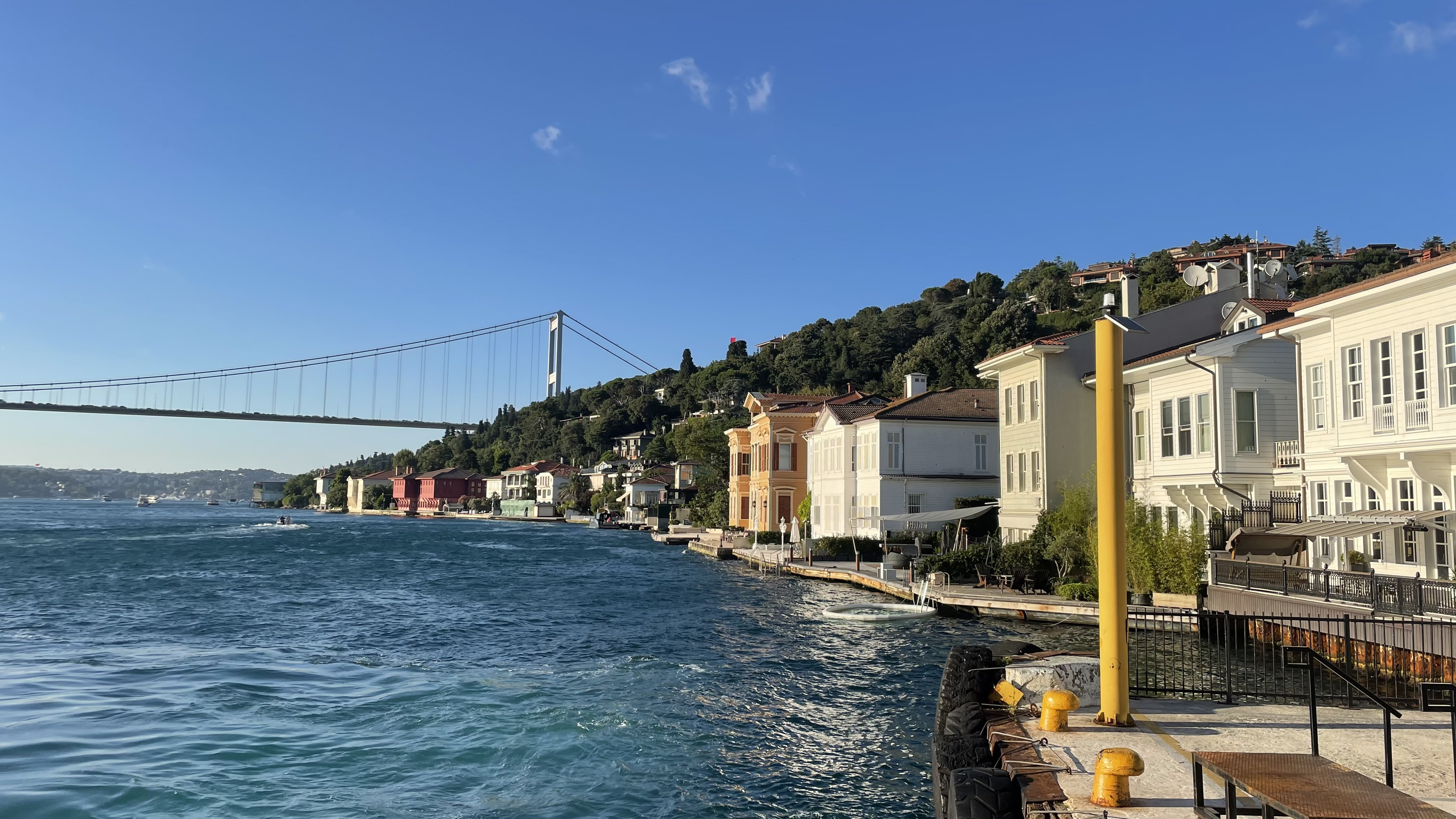
The waterfront of Üsküdar as seen from Kandilli Pier

The district of Üsküdar is one of Istanbul's oldest-established residential areas. It is directly opposite the old city of Eminönü and transport across the Bosphorus is easy by boat or bridge. So there are well-established communities here, many retired people, and many residents commute to the European side for work or school (being cheap and central Üsküdar has a large student population). During the rush-hour, the waterfront is bustling with people running from ferryboats and motorboats onto buses and minibuses. The Çamlıca Hill is a popular picnic spot for many Istanbul residents.

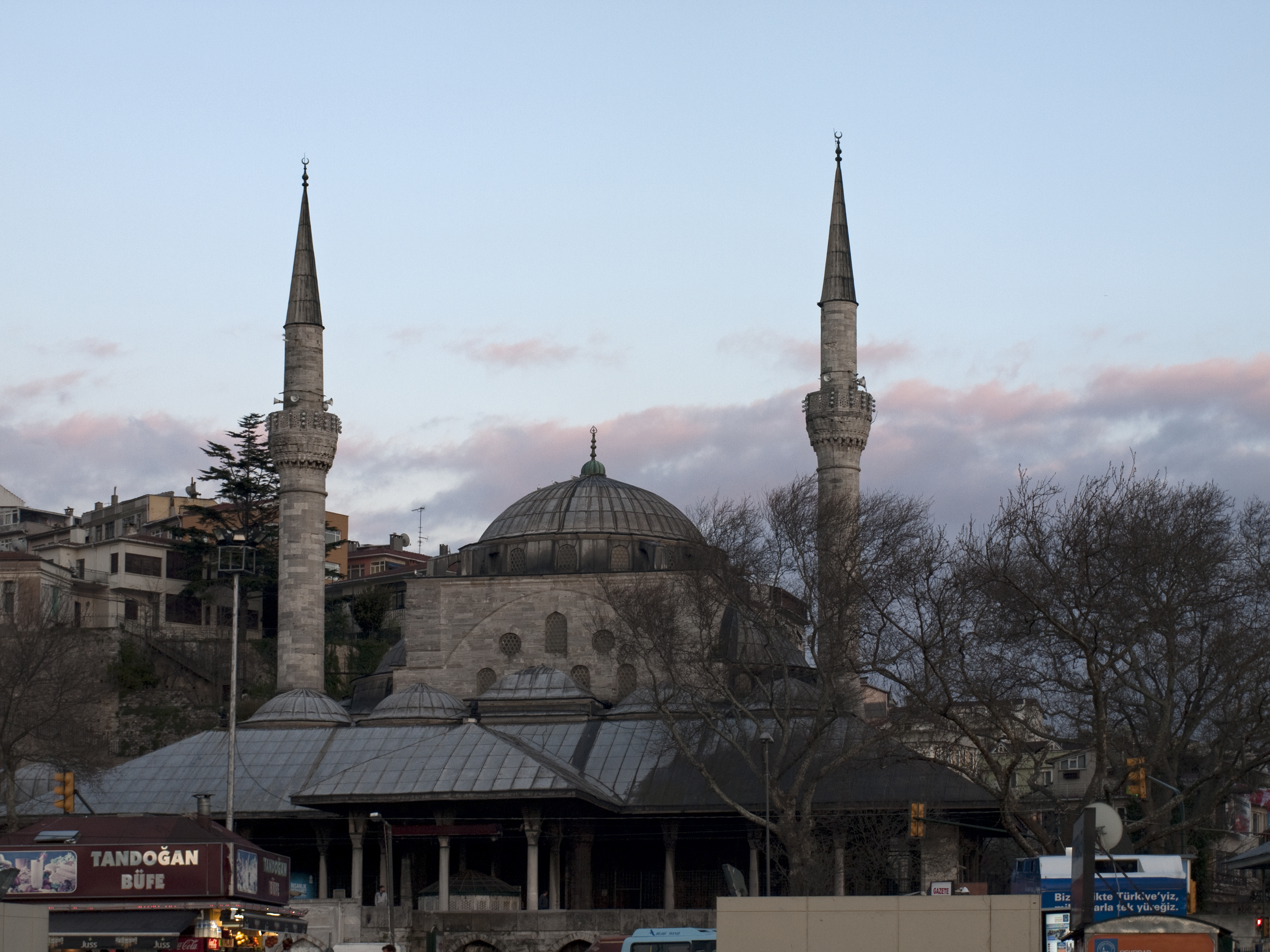
Mihrimah Sultan (İskele) Mosque in Üsküdar

The central square is the center of Üsküdar with departing ferries and a Marmaray station adding to the importance of the square. The area behind the ferry dock is a busy shopping district, with many restaurants (including the well-known Kanaat Lokantası serving Ottoman cuisine, olive oil-based dishes, and ice cream) and a number of important Ottoman mosques (see section below). The youth mainly congregate around cafes on Uncular Gastronomy Street that saw a rise in popularity following the Covid-19 pandemic. The private Üsküdar University, founded by the Human Values and Mental Health Foundation, has a campus here. Uskudar has two public libraries: Şemsi Pasha Mosque Public Library (built in 1953) and Selimiye Public Library.

== Neighborhoods ==
Üsküdar is a municipality within borders of Istanbul Metropolitan Municipality (büyükşehir). The municipality is subdivided into 33 neighborhoods (mahalleler):

- Acıbadem
- Ahmediye
- Altunizade
- Aziz Mahmut Hüdayi
- Bahçelievler
- Barbaros
- Beylerbeyi
- Bulgurlu
- Burhaniye
- Çengelköy
- Cumhuriyet
- Ferah
- Güzeltepe
- İcadiye
- Kandilli
- Kirazlıtepe
- Kısıklı
- Küçük Çamlıca
- Küçüksu
- Kuleli
- Küplüce
- Kuzguncuk
- Mehmet Akif Ersoy
- Mimar Sinan
- Muratreis
- Salacak
- Selami Ali
- Selimiye
- Sultantepe
- Ünalan
- Valide-İ Atik
- Yavuztürk
- Zeynep Kamil

The boundaries and names of the official neighborhoods change from time to time and sometimes do not correspond to historically recognized neighborhoods or to residents' own perceptions. The most prominent neighborhood is Üsküdar's historic center (merkez), centered on the ferry docks and roughly corresponding to the current Mimar Sinan neighborhood (former Selmanağa, Tembel Hacı Mehmet, and İnkılap neighborhoods). This area includes large historic mosques, many businesses and markets, and is a transportation hub. Other prominent neighborhoods include the former villages on the Bosphorus to the north of the historic center, Kuzguncuk, Beylerbeyi, Çengelköy, Kuleli, Vaniköy (now part of Kandilli), and Kandilli; the neighborhoods along the Bosphorus shore south of the historic center, Salacak, Harem (now part of Aziz Mahmud Hudayı), and Selimiye; and the mostly residential neighborhoods on the hilltops and hillsides, Doğancılar (now mostly part of Aziz Mahmud Hudayı), İmrahor (now part of Salacak), Selamsız (now part of Selamiali), Bağlarbaşı (now part of Altunizade), Altunizade, Acıbadem, Küçük Çamlıca, and Büyük Çamlıca (mostly in Kısıklı, Burhaniye, and Ferah).

=== Salacak ===
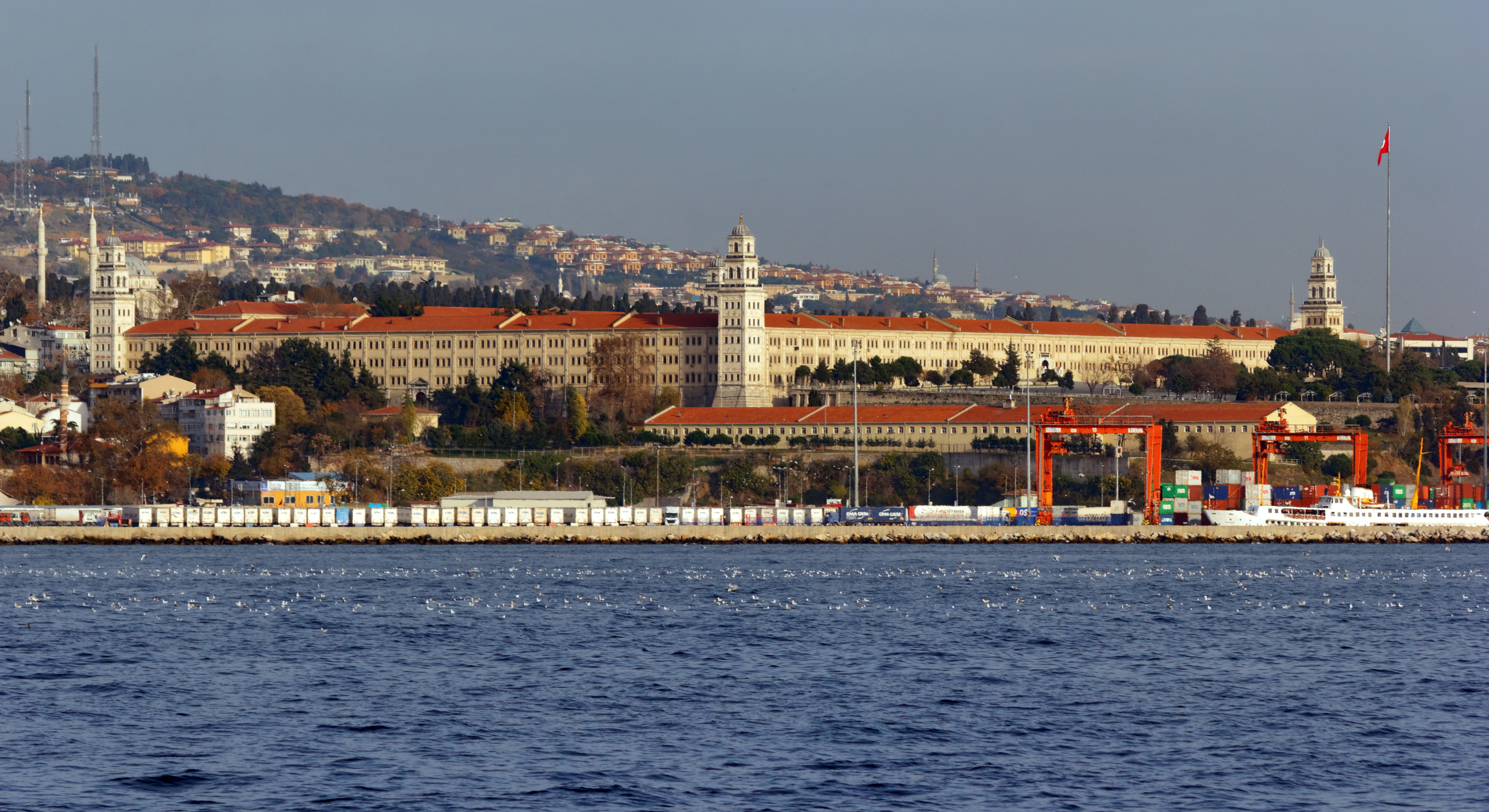
Selimiye Barracks, located in the Üsküdar district

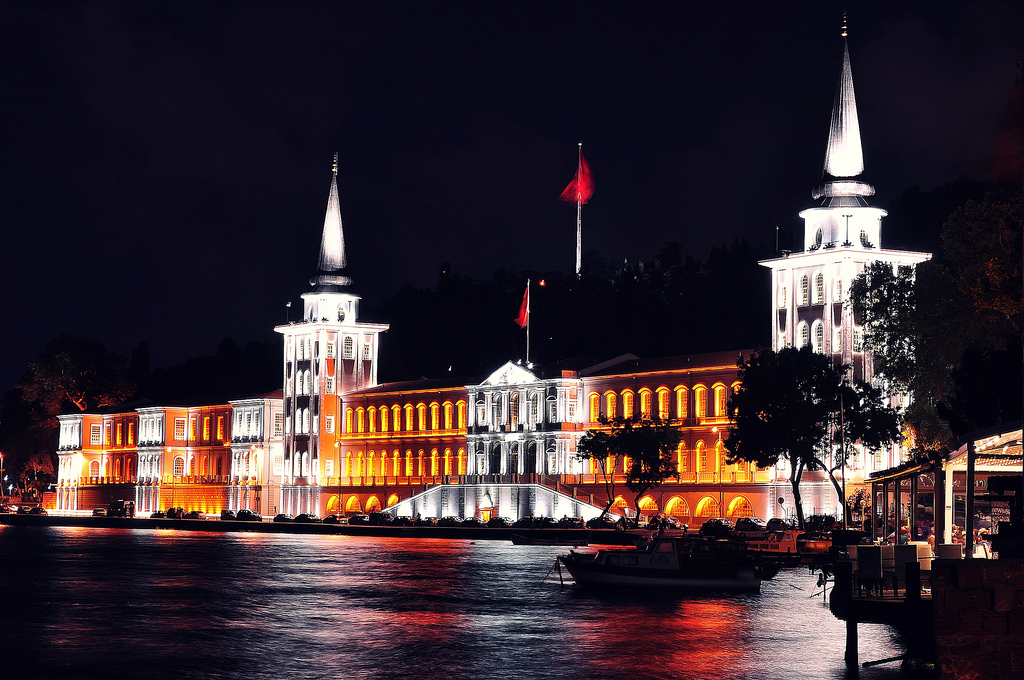
Kuleli Military High School view from the water at night

Üsküdar's long promenade along the coast from the center down in southern direction towards the bus station at Harem is popular in summer as it commands views of the European shore of Topkapı Palace, Hagia Sophia, Sultan Ahmed Mosque (The Blue Mosque), Taksim and Beşiktaş. This promenade is lined with cafes and restaurants, the most prominent of which is not on the coast but out in the water: the Maiden's Tower (Kız Kulesi), a small tower just off the coast that has existed since Byzantine times, when it was called Leander's Tower. From time to time it has been used as a toll booth; now it is used as an upscale restaurant and a venue for wedding parties. The name comes from a legend about a princess shut in the tower. On nice days people gather on the shore to fish, sit and drink tea or to enjoy being out on the water in little rowing boats. The Ayazma Mosque (1760) stands on the shore opposite the tower. The streets of Salacak behind the coast, in the area called Imrahor, are attractive and still hold a number of classic Ottoman wooden houses. The legendary 17th-century Hezarfen Ahmet Çelebi is said to have landed here on his hang-glider flight across the Bosphorus. Further down along the coast is the Harem neighborhood, which contains a major intercity bus terminal and the Selimiye Barracks, where Florence Nightingale once tended wounded British soldiers. Behind the coast, towards the east, Üsküdar climbs steeply into the residential areas uphill, Bağlarbaşı and Doğancılar.

=== Doğancılar ===
A neighborhood on the hill above Salacak, with plenty of trees between the buildings and a small park. There is a wide avenue winding uphill from Üsküdar, which has plenty of shops and cafes, and also a theater (the Musahipzade Celal Sahnesi), the fire station, the former women's prison (Paşakapısı Prison), Burhan Felek High School and Doğancılar mosque (opposite the park).

=== Bağlarbaşı and Altunizade ===
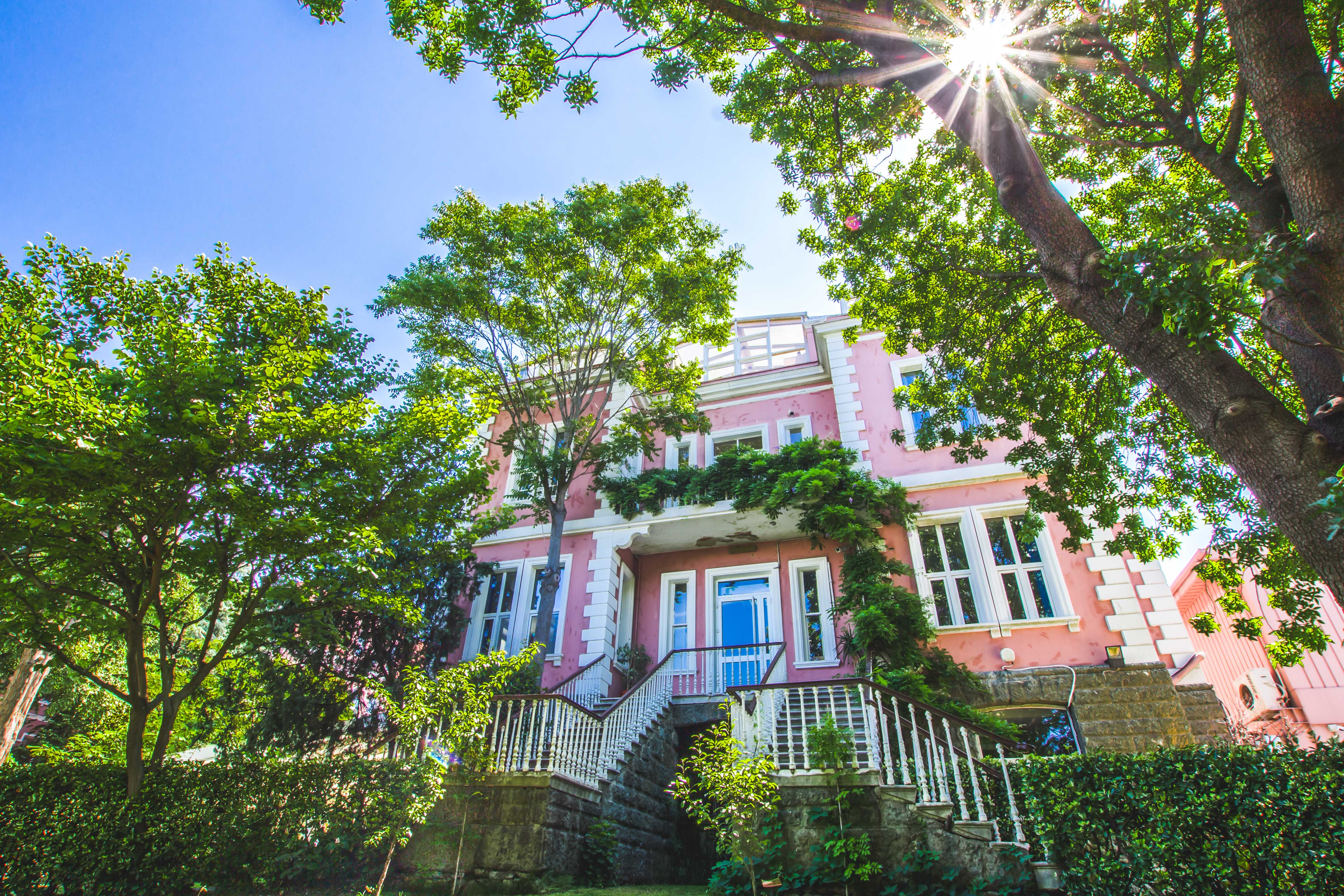
Üsküdar American Academy Bowker Hall

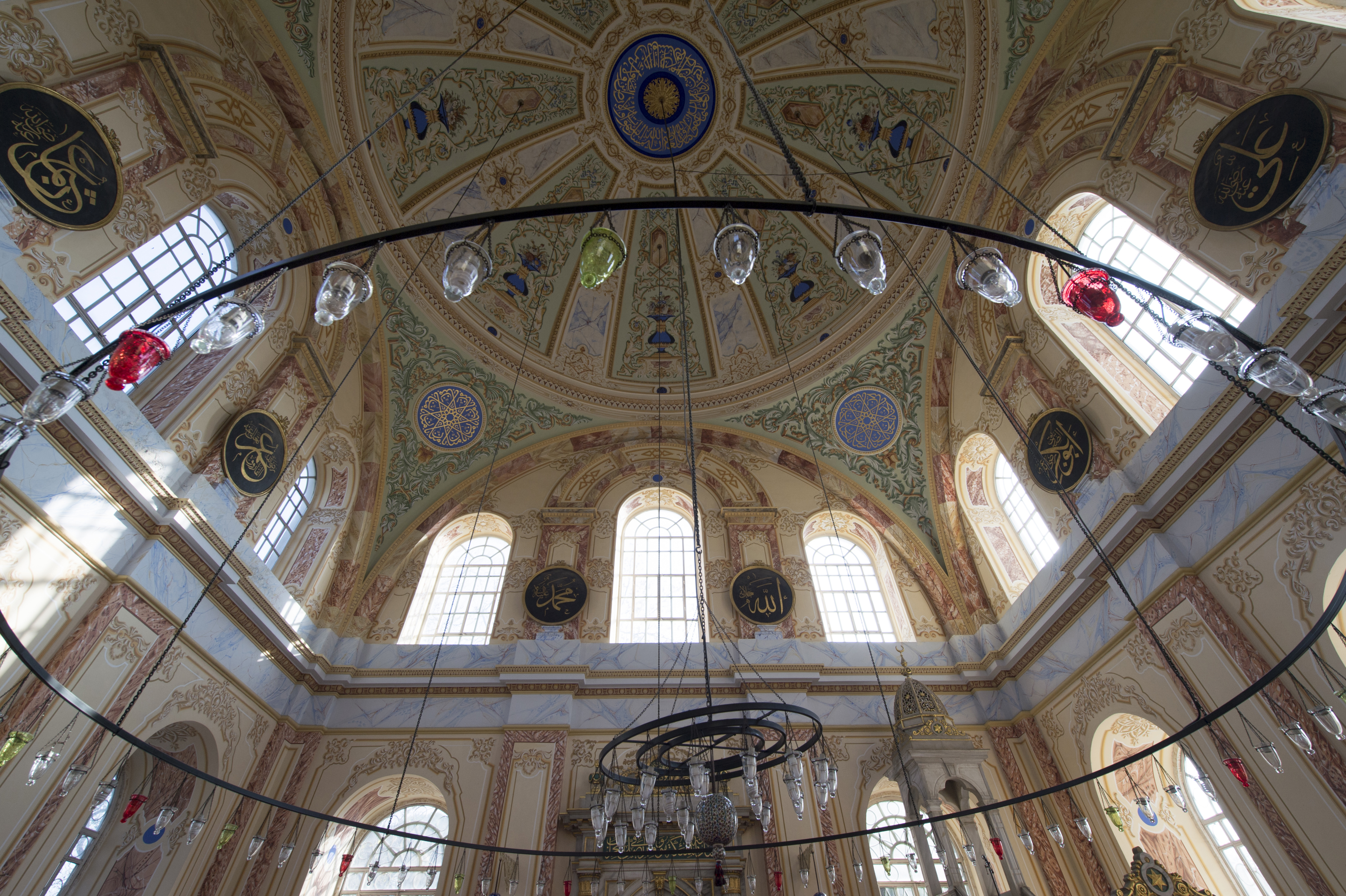
Interior of Altunizade Mosque

Formerly orchards and fruit-gardens (bağ), it became a residential neighborhood in the 19th century, home to the typical Istanbul urban mix of Greeks, Jews, Turks, and Armenians. The neighborhood still has an Armenian school and the Armenian church of Surp Garabed, built in 1844. Until the 1990s the area remained a middle-class residential neighborhood, and today is still an attractive district with a mixture of housing and office/commercial property. A number of properties have been converted to office and business use. Altunizade is still an attractive residential neighborhood, home to the large and busy Capitol shopping and entertainment center. Altunizade was established in the early 19th century by Altunizade İsmail Zühtü Pasha. He also commissioned Altunizade Mosque, which was built in 1866. There are a number of well-known schools within the district including Üsküdar American Academy, one of the oldest established schools in the city, Üsküdar High School, a state school, Haydarpasha High School, Marmara University's faculty of theology; and Burhan Felek sports complex.

=== Selamsız ===
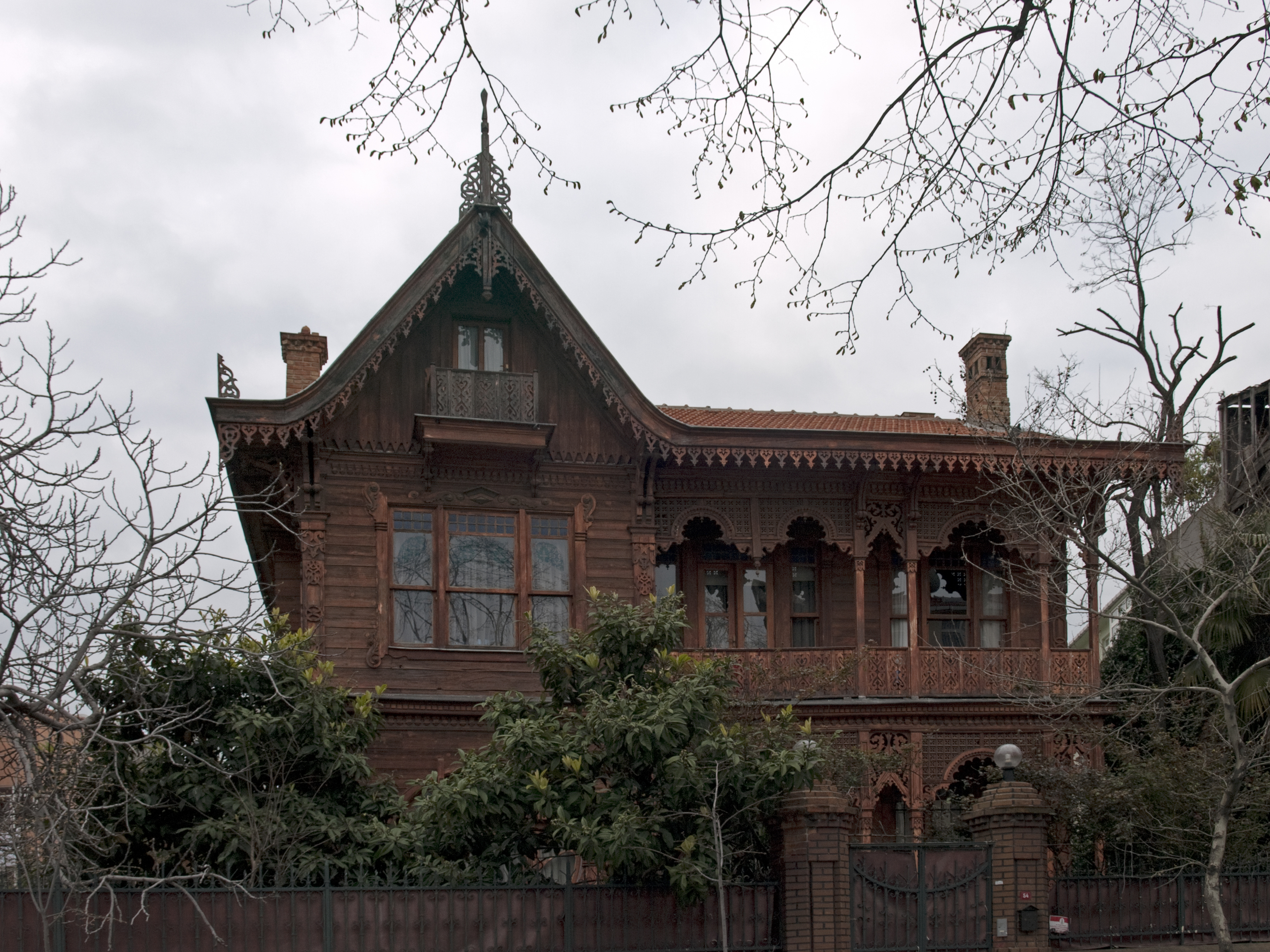
A wooden house in Selamsız

Selamsız is an old residential neighborhood, home to a Roma community and Roma culture.

=== Acıbadem ===
The top half of the district Acıbadem also belongs to Üsküdar, including Acıbadem and Academic hospitals. This avenue is the center one of the most populous neighborhoods of Istanbul, consisting of tree-lined streets and planned housing areas, as well as Fine Arts Academy (Marmara University), and Çamlıca Girls’ High School.

=== Paşalimanı ===
Just past Üsküdar the coastline is called Paşalimanı. Liman means "port" in Turkish (from Greek limàni, λιμάνι) and boats would moor here. A large stone building on the shore, built as a tobacco warehouse by late-Ottoman architect Vedat Tek, has been completely renovated and now serves as headquarters of Ciner Grubu (Ciner Group), an industrial conglomerate. There is a small area of parkland right on the shore and the entrance to the large Fetih Paşa Korusu park is here.

=== Kuzguncuk ===
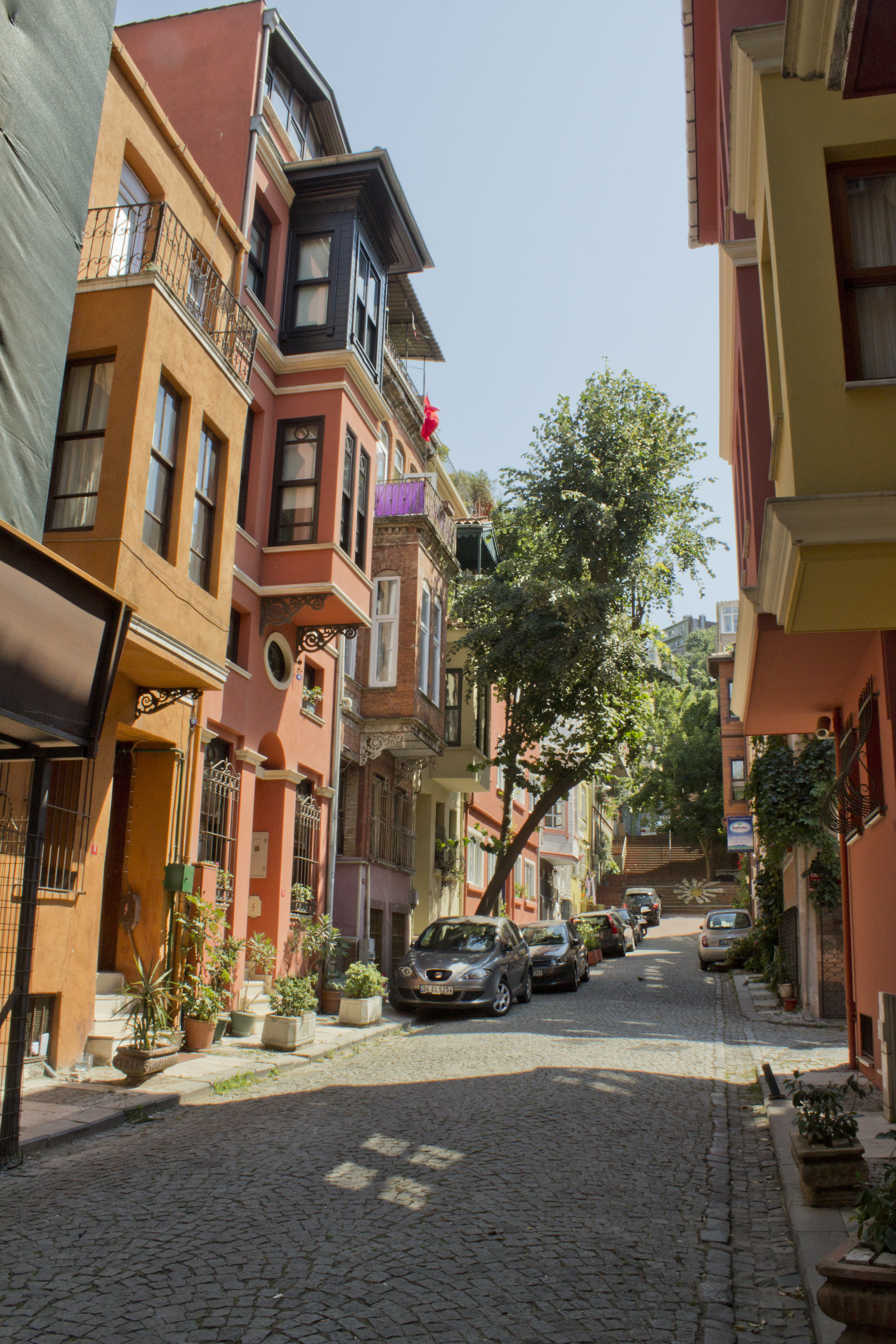
Kuzguncuk streets

A Bosphorus village of streets with little shops, seaside cafes, and many old-fashioned wooden houses, Kuzguncuk has a village atmosphere. There is a ferry dock and a little park on the waterfront. The village was called Kosinitsa in the Byzantine period. The area has become an attractive middle-class neighborhood, home to people like film director Uğur Yücel, sculptor Kuzgun Acar, painter Acar Başkut (whose studio is in the village), architects Nevzat Sayin and Cengiz Bektaş, and the late poet Can Yücel. The neighborhood is also portrayed in the novel Mediterranean Waltz (Kumral Ada Mavi Tuna) by Buket Uzuner.

=== Beylerbeyi ===
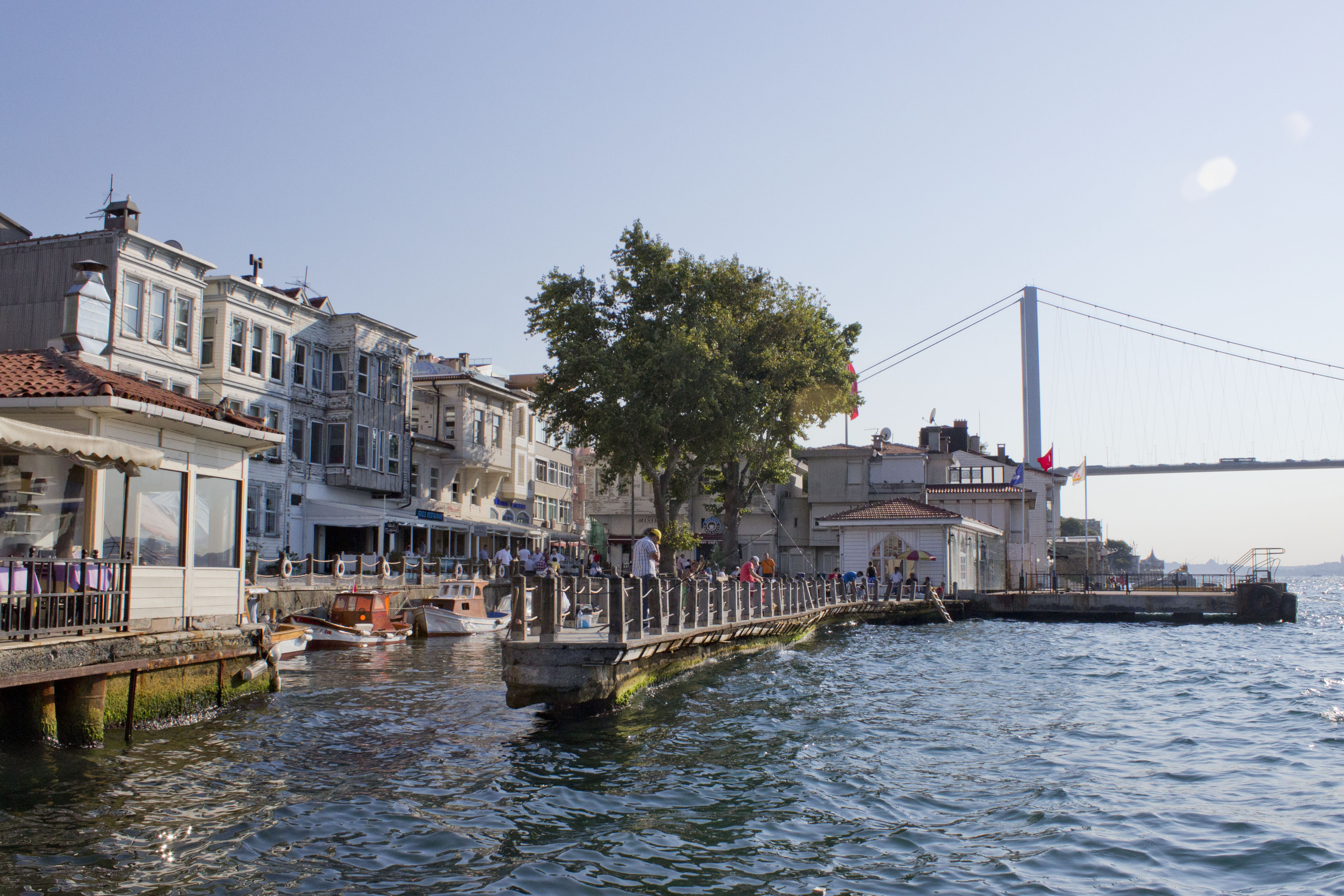
Beylerbeyi Harbor with the Bosphorus Bridge in the background

Just beyond the Bosphorus Bridge is Beylerbeyi, an area known in Istanbul for its fish restaurants, and for the Beylerbeyi Palace on the shore. Sultan Abdülhamit II of Ottoman Empire died here under house arrest in 1918.

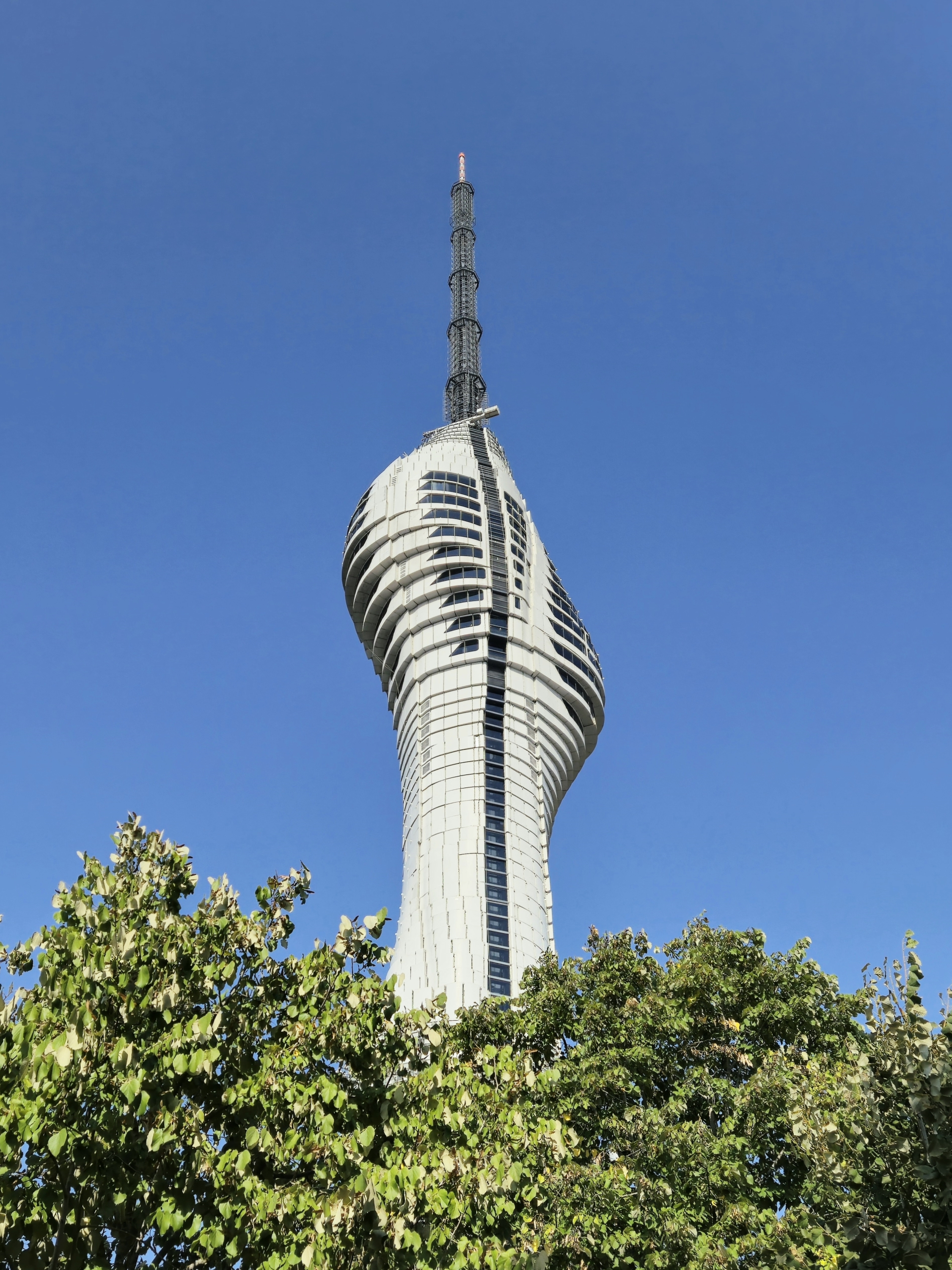
Çamlıca TV and Radio Tower on Küçük Çamlıca

=== Çengelköy ===
Formerly a waterfront village, known for the cucumbers grown in gardens on the green hillsides behind. There are a number of very grand seaside villas (yalı). The village has a number of shops, bakeries and waterfront cafes offering gorgeous views of the Bosphorus that tend to be busy, especially at weekends. Since the mid-1990s new housing estates have been built on the hillsides and now there are always queues of traffic through Çengelköy. But the village retains some of its romantic charm. The word çengel means "hook" or "anchor" in Turkish, and köy means "village"; apparently there were blacksmiths or metalworkers in the village in Ottoman times.

The Kuleli Military High School is on the Bosphorus just beyond Çengelköy. Most graduates from here go on to military academy and careers as army officers.

=== Çamlıca ===
This hill, known as Tchamlidja in 19th-century spelling, has the highest point in Istanbul and commands a panoramic view of the entire city. One of the most prestiged schools of Turkey, Bilfen College is located on the Çamlıca hill.

== Climate ==
Üsküdar experiences a humid subtropical climate (Cfa/Cf) according to both Köppen and Trewartha climate classifications, with cool winters and warm to hot summers. Unlike most of southern Istanbul, Üsküdar is cooler than its surroundings, with an average temperature slightly below 14 °C (57 °F), and an AHS heat zone rating of 3. However, its coastal location still does allow it to be classified as USDA hardiness zone 9a.

Climate data for Kandilli, Istanbul
Month	Jan	Feb	Mar	Apr	May	Jun	Jul	Aug	Sep	Oct	Nov	Dec	Year
Mean daily maximum °C (°F)	7.9 (46.2)	8.0 (46.4)	10.4 (50.7)	15.5 (59.9)	20.2 (68.4)	24.9 (76.8)	27.1 (80.8)	27.0 (80.6)	23.8 (74.8)	19.0 (66.2)	14.6 (58.3)	10.5 (50.9)	17.4 (63.3)
Daily mean °C (°F)	5.2 (41.4)	5.1 (41.2)	7.0 (44.6)	11.3 (52.3)	15.8 (60.4)	20.2 (68.4)	22.7 (72.9)	22.8 (73.0)	19.6 (67.3)	15.4 (59.7)	11.3 (52.3)	7.8 (46.0)	13.7 (56.6)
Mean daily minimum °C (°F)	2.4 (36.3)	2.2 (36.0)	3.5 (38.3)	7.1 (44.8)	11.3 (52.3)	15.4 (59.7)	18.2 (64.8)	18.5 (65.3)	15.3 (59.5)	11.7 (53.1)	8.0 (46.4)	5.0 (41.0)	9.9 (49.8)
Average precipitation mm (inches)	103 (4.1)	83 (3.3)	69 (2.7)	45 (1.8)	37 (1.5)	36 (1.4)	32 (1.3)	39 (1.5)	69 (2.7)	96 (3.8)	101 (4.0)	128 (5.0)	838 (33.1)

== Sights of Üsküdar ==
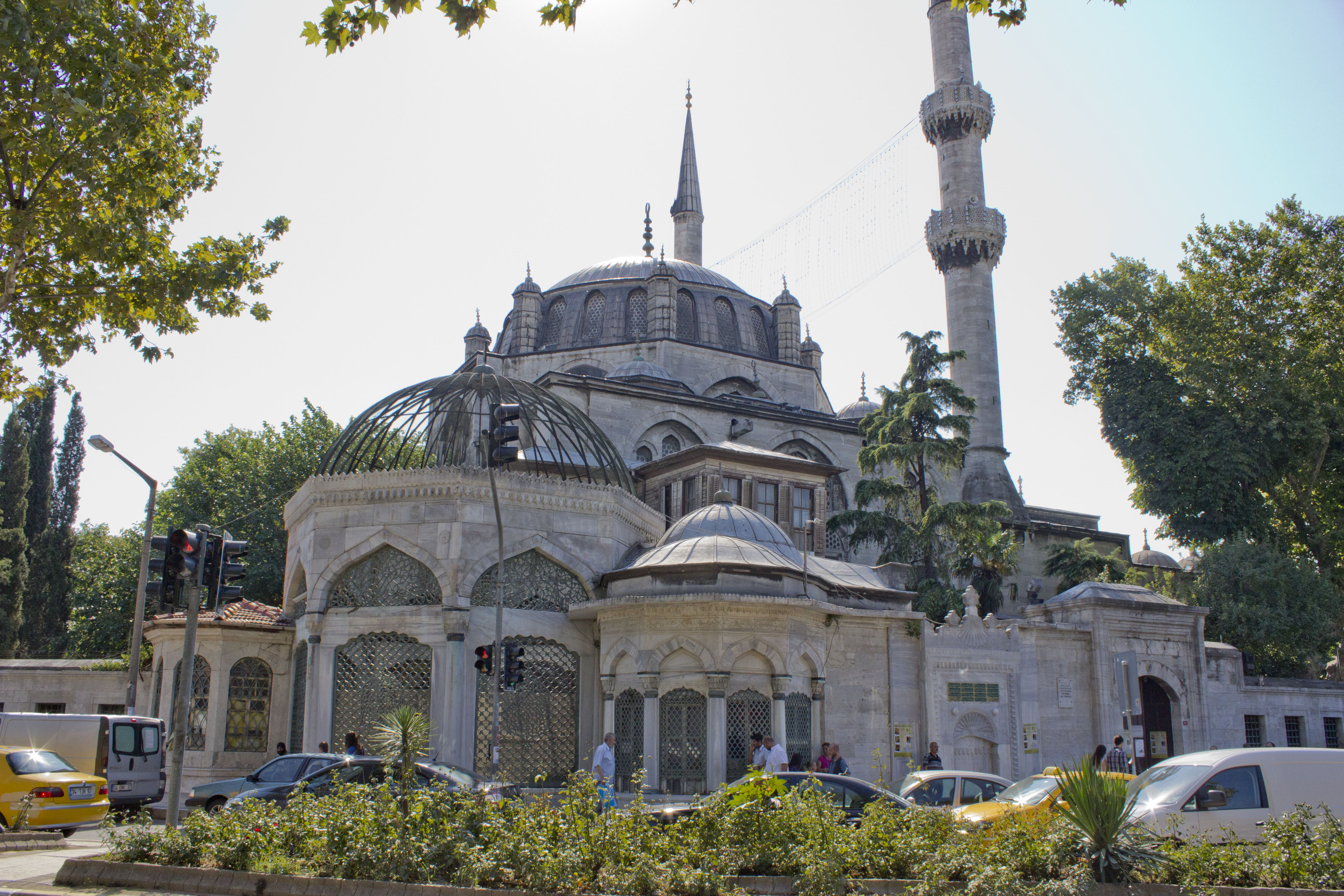
Yeni Valide Camii, the "New Mosque" of the mother sultan

Though densely populated, Üsküdar has many areas of greenery, including the Çamlıca hills, the Bosphorus coastline, and various parks. In addition, the area has a high concentration of historic buildings and religious sites.

=== Parks ===
Fethi Paşa Korusu is a large park on the hillside that extends down to the Bosphorus shore, slightly beyond Üsküdar in the area called Paşalimanı. It is named after Fetih Ahmet Paşa an Ottoman prince who among other things was responsible for industrializing the glassworks of Ottoman Turkey, and had a home in the area. The parkland is in fact privately owned and let to the state on condition that it is preserved as a park. The owners are the estate of Turkish industrialist Nuri Demirağ. There is a café in the park, a stone waterfall which children climb on and a small stage area where on Friday evenings in summer a band of amateur musicians give open-air concerts at sunset. At weekends the young lovers of Üsküdar gather here to stroll and cuddle in the shade.

=== Mosques ===
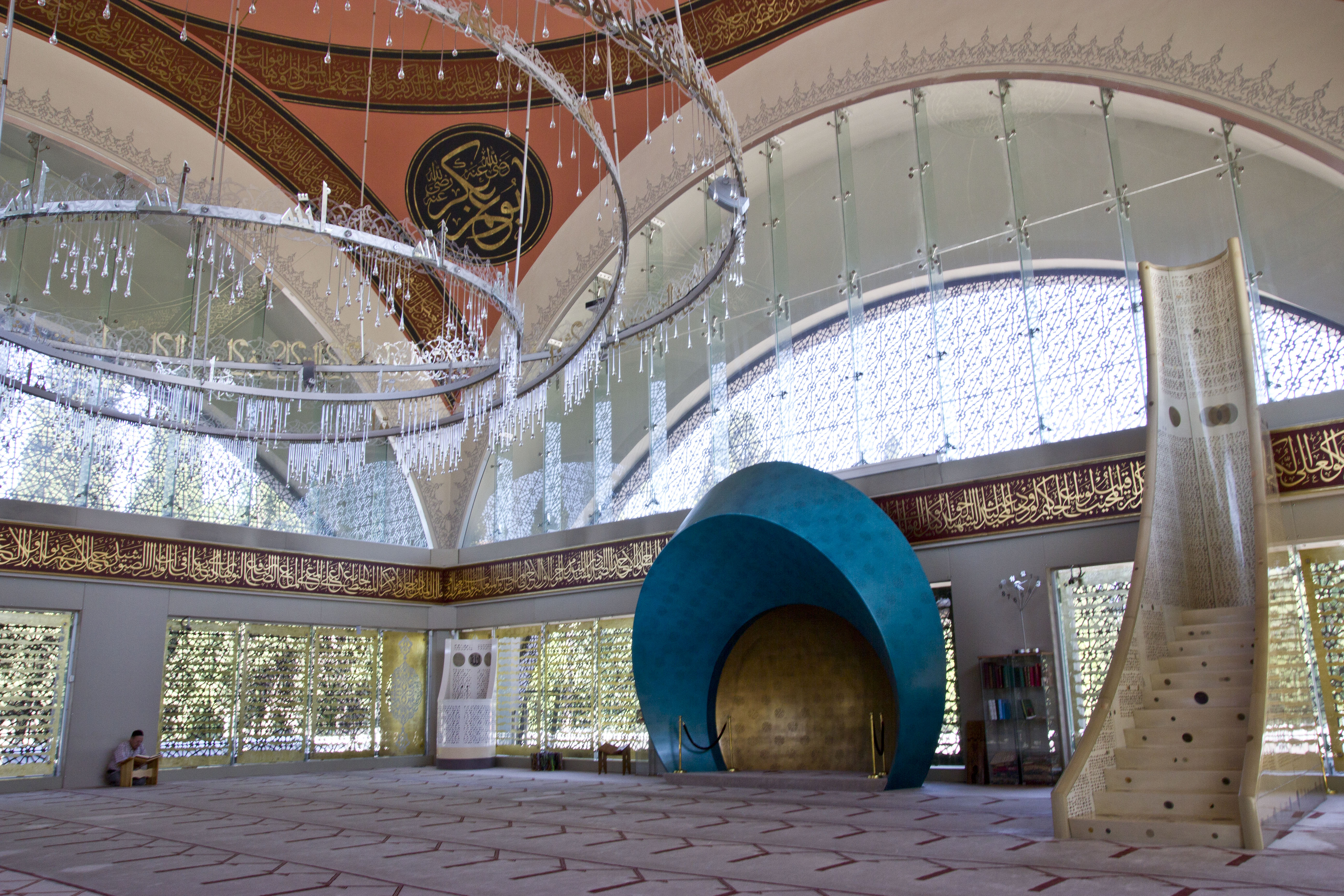
Şakirin Mosque

Üsküdar is home to over 180 mosques, many of them historic Ottoman buildings, many built for women of the imperial harem, and many built by the architect Mimar Sinan. Among the first things one sees on arriving by ferry are two mosques near the ferry terminal, both of them designed by Sinan. The larger one is the Mihrimah Sultan Mosque, sometimes called the İskele (Dock) Mosque, built by a daughter of Suleiman the Magnificent; the smaller one is the Şemsi Pasha Mosque, built by a vizier of Suleiman's. Şemsi Pasha has a small library building in the courtyard. Opposite the Mihrimah Sultan Mosque is the large Yeni Valide Mosque, commissioned by Ahmet III's mother. Uphill from the dock in the Valideiatik neighborhood is the Atik Valide Mosque, built by Murat III's mother and also designed by Sinan.

Further uphill from there is the smaller Çinili (Tiled) Mosque. In Karacaahmet Cemetery is the large Şakirin Mosque, built in 2009. The Namazgâh Mosque (built in 1860) in the eastern part of Üsküdar, close to the border with Ümraniye, is one of the few historical wooden mosques in Istanbul. The new Çamlıca Mosque is a landmark with its grand size overlooking Istanbul on Chamlija Hill.

Other important mosques of Üsküdar include Ahmediye, Ahmet Ağa, Ahmet Çelebi, Altunizade, Ayazma, Aziz Mahmud Hudayi, Baki Efendi, Beylerbeyi, Bodrumi Ömer Lütfi Efendi, Bostancı, Bulgurlu, Çakırcıbaşı, Fatih, Gülfem Hatun, Hacı Ömer, İmrahor, İranlılar, İstavroz, Kandilli, Kara Davut Pasha, Kaymak Mustafa Pasha, Kısıklı, Küleli Bahçe, Malatyalı İsmail Ağa, Mirzazade, Paşalimanı, Rum Mehmet Pasha, Selimiye, Solak Sinan, Tahır Efendi, Üryanizade, and Vanikoy.

=== Churches ===
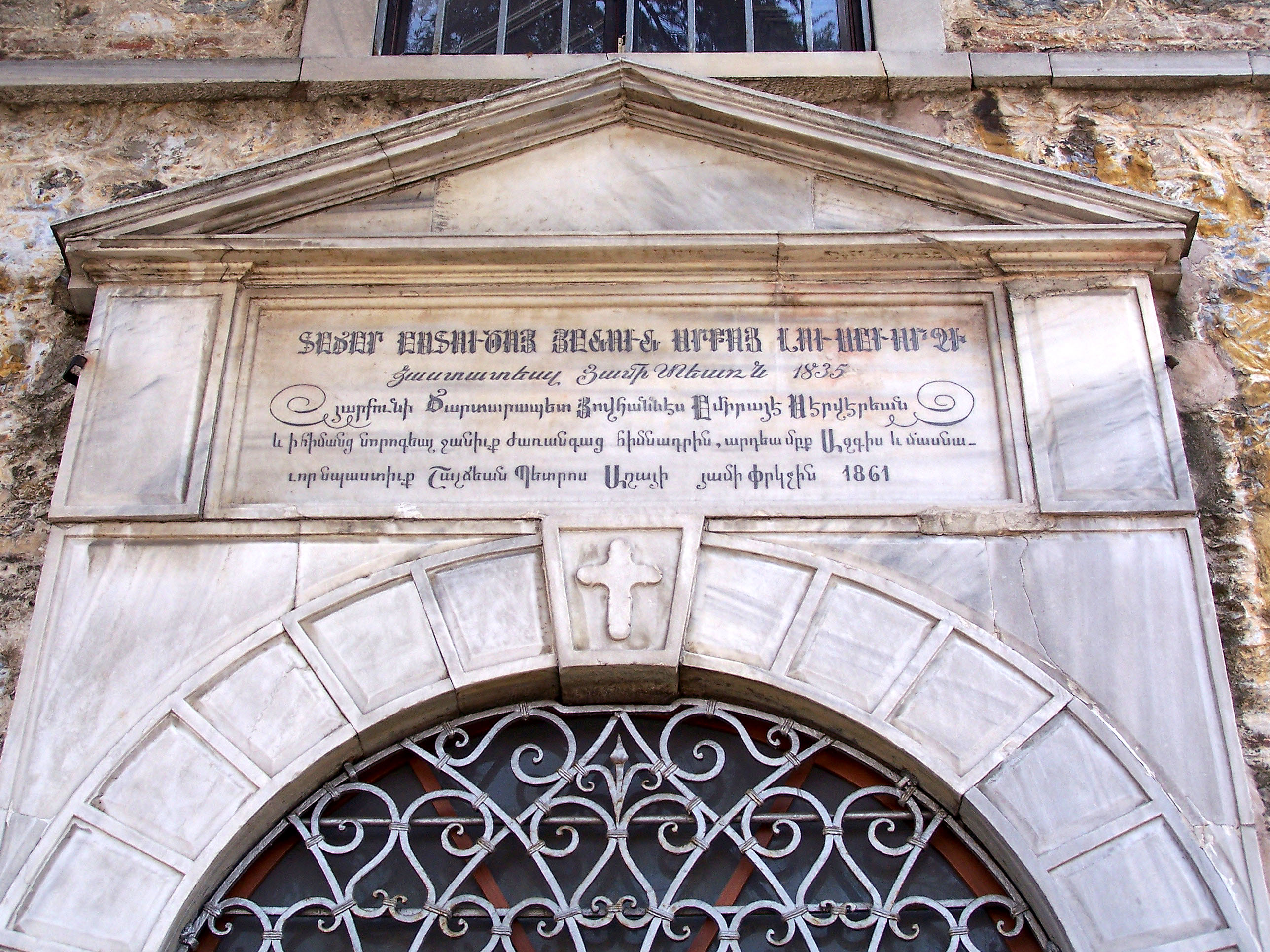
The Surp Krikor Lusavoriç (St Gregory the Illuminator) Armenian Church

Churches of Üsküdar include the İlya Profiti (Prophet Elijah) Greek Orthodox Church in Muratreis (present building built in 1831), the Kandilli Khristos Rum Ortodoks Kilisesi (built in 1810), the Surp Garabet (Saint John the Baptist) Armenian Church in Murat Reis (first church on the site, 1590; present building built 1888), the Surp Haç (Holy Cross) Armenian Church in Selami Ali (built 1676, rebuilt 1880), the Surp Krikor Lusavoriç (Saint Gregory the Illuminator) Armenian Church in Kuzguncuk (first built 1835, rebuilt 1861), and the Surp Yergodasan Arakelots (Twelve Apostoles) Armenian Church in Kandilli (built 1846).

=== Synagogues ===
Synagogues of Üsküdar include Bet Nissim (built in the 1840s) and Bet Yaakov (built in 1878), both in the coastal Kuzguncuk neighborhood.

=== Other religious buildings ===
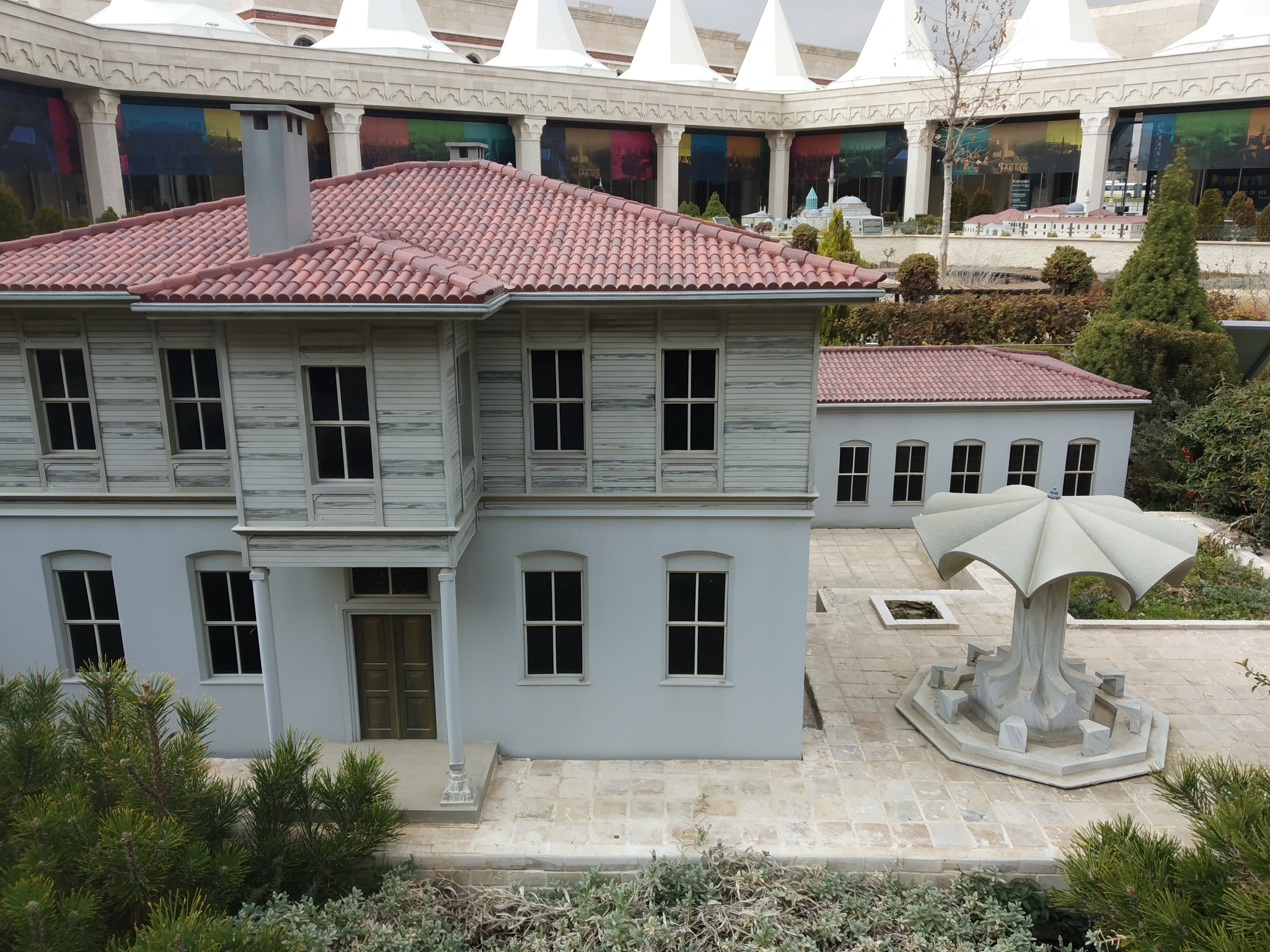
THe Üsküdar Mevlevi Lodge

Important tekkes (dervish lodges) include the Aziz Mahmud Hudayi (1541–1628), who is buried in the neighbourhood named after him and is the founder of the Jelveti Sufi order; the Nasuhi Efendi at Doğancılar, who is the founder of the Nasuhiyye Khalwati Sufi order and the grandfather of the Turkish-American music producer Ahmet Ertegun; and the famous Özbekler Tekkesi at Sultantepe, where the Ertegun family members are buried. The Üsküdar Mevlevi dergah is the second of its kind following the one in Galata. Built in 1790 by Sheikh Numan Dede of the Galata lodge, it underwent many restorations and functions as the Classic Turkish Arts Foundation today.

Important tombs of saints (awliya) in Üsküdar include those of Aziz Mahmud Hudayi, Shaykh Mustafa Devati, and Shaykh Mehmet Nasuhi. Tombs of historical figures include Hacı Ahmet Pasha, Halil Pasha, İbrahim Edhem Pasha, Karaca Ahmet, and Rum Mehmet Pasha. Karacaahmet Cemetery, the largest cemetery in Istanbul and one of the oldest, has many notable burials. Some of these include Süleyman Hilmi Tunahan (1888-1959), an Islamic scholar; Shaykh Jamaluddin Kumuki (1788-1869), the father-in-law of Imam Shamil; Sheikh Hamdullah (d. 1526), a master calligrapher. The cemetery runs between Üsküdar and Kadıköy.

=== Çeşmes and sebils ===
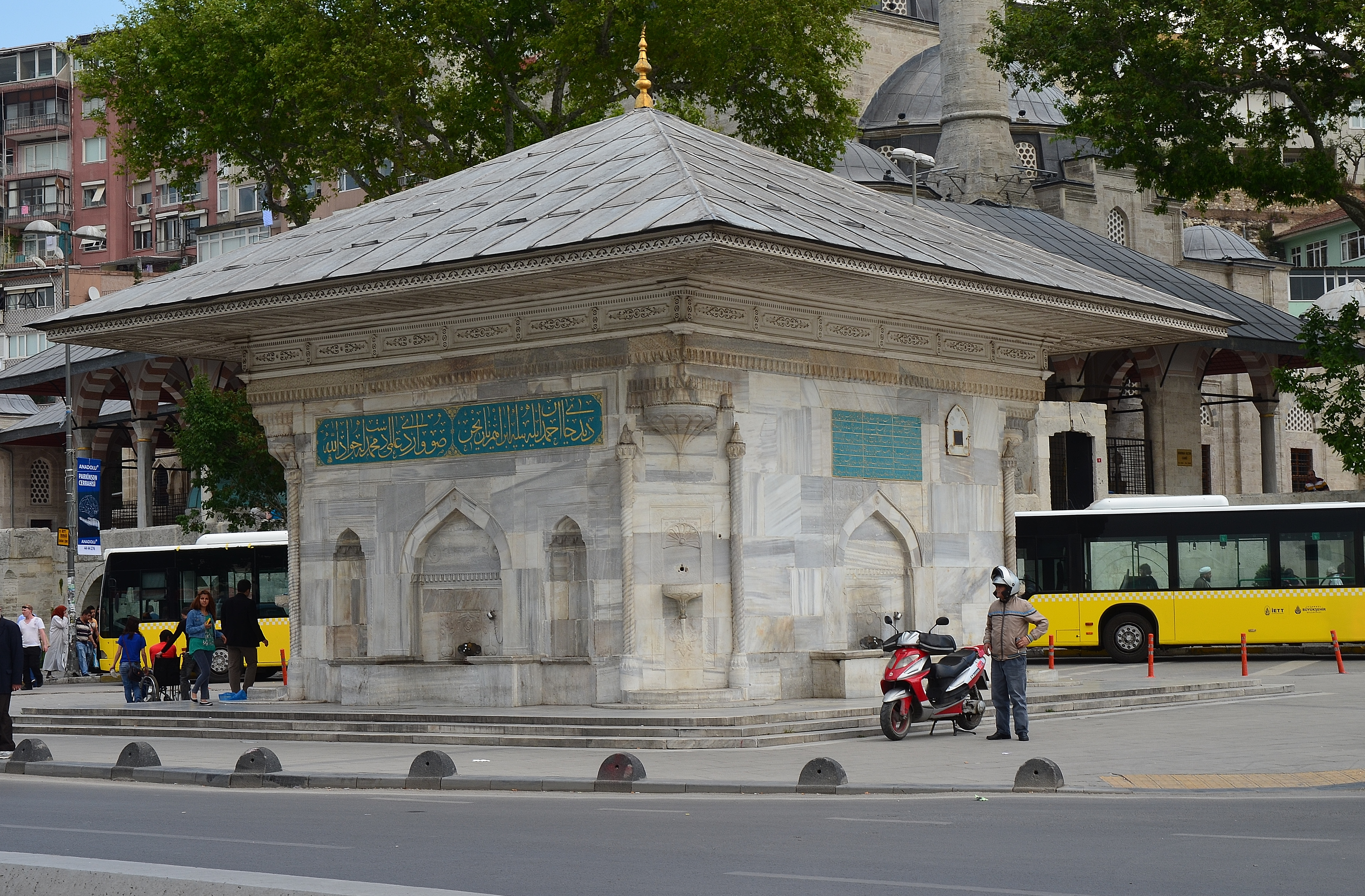
Sultan Ahmet III Fountain in Üsküdar square

Other notable Ottoman features to be seen in Üsküdar are the many çeşmes (drinking water sources) and sebils (kiosks for distribution of drinks). One of the largest and most visible çeşmes is the fountain of Ahmet III (1728–29), an impressive marble structure in the center of Üsküdar near the ferry docks. Other important çeşmes of Üsküdar include Gülnuş Emetullah Valide Sultan (1709, next to the Yeni Valide Mosque), Hüseyin Avni Pasha (1874, Paşalimanı), Mustafa III (1760, next to the Ayazma Mosque), and Selim III (1802, in Çiçekçi, Harem İskelesi Street). Important sebils of Üsküdar include those of Hacı Hüseyin Pasha (1865, near the Karacaahmet Cemetery), Halil Pasha (1617, attached to Halil Pasha's tomb), Hudayi (first built in the 1590s but later much remodeled, near Aziz Mahmud Hudayi's tomb), Sadettin Efendi (1741, near the tomb of Karacaahmet Cemetery), Şeyhülislam Arif Hikmet Bey (1858, near the Kartal Baba Mosque), Valide Çinili (1640, next to the Çinili Mosque), Valide-i Cedid (1709, next to the Yeni Valide Mosque), and Ziya Bey (1866, near the tomb of Karacaahmet).

=== Museums and palaces ===
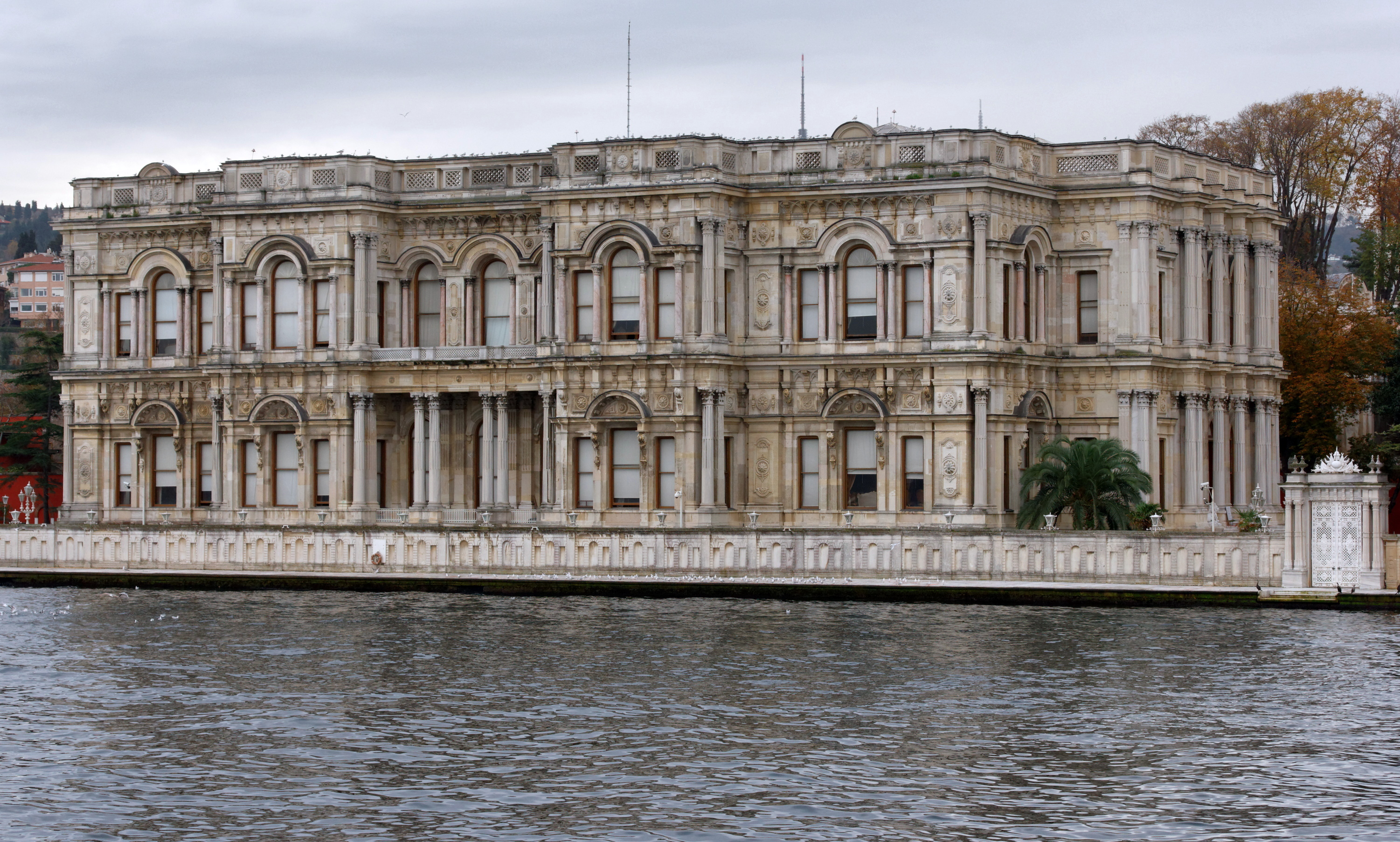
View of Beylerbeyi Palace from the Bosporus

The Florence Nightingale Museum inside the Selimiye Barracks in Selimiye displays items associated with Nightingale and her medical work in Istanbul during the Crimean War. Beylerbeyi Palace in Beylerbeyi was built for Sultan Abdulaziz in the 1860s, and used as the last place Sultan Abdul Hamid II was held under house arrest by the Revolutionaries.

== Education ==
- Marmara University
- Üsküdar University
- Tarabya British Schools, Çengelköy campus
- Üsküdar American Academy (formerly American Academy for Girls)

== Twin municipalities ==
- (North Macedonia) Saraj, Skopje
- (United States) Brooklyn, New York
- (Japan) Shibuya, Tokyo

== Notable residents ==
- Richard Guyon (1813–1856), British-born Hungarian soldier, general in the Hungarian revolutionary army
- Maximus the Confessor, Byzantine monk, theologian and scholar. He entered a monastery in Chrysopolis in the early 7th century.
- Philippicus, Byzantine general, a monk in Chrysopolis between 602–610, buried in Chrysopolis
- Sergius I of Constantinople, Ecumenical Patriarch of Constantinople
- Patriarch Pyrrhus of Constantinople, Ecumenical Patriarch of Constantinople
- Alexios Mosele, Byzantine aristocrat and general
- Michael III, Byzantine emperor
- Florence Nightingale, English nurse, writer and statistician
- Mehmet Akif Ersoy, Turkish poet of the Turkish national anthem
- Halide Edib Adıvar, Turkish novelist and feminist political leader
- Xenophon Sideridis, Greek historian, writer and researcher
- Şeker Ahmed Pasha, Turkish painter
- Mehmed Orhan, Turkish aristocrat, a pretender to the throne of the Ottoman Dynasty
- Münir Ertegün, Turkish legal counsel in international law to the Ottoman Empire and diplomat of Turkey
- Ahmet Ertegun, Turkish-American musician and businessman. Founder and president of Atlantic Records and New York Cosmos soccer team.
- Nesuhi Ertegun, Turkish-American record producer and executive of Atlantic Records and WEA International
- Barış Manço, Turkish rock singer, composer and television producer
- Bülent Ersoy, transgender Turkish celebrity and singer of Ottoman classical music
- Özgü Namal, Turkish actress
- Billur Kalkavan, Turkish actress, socialite and television presenter
- Zara, popular Turkish folk singer
- Semahat Özdenses (1913–2008), Turkish singer and composer of Ottoman classical music
- Hasan Çelebi, world-renown master Islamic calligrapher
- Kadir Mısıroğlu (1933–2019), Islamist writer and conspiracy theorist
- Zabel Sibil Asadour, Armenian poet and writer
- Calouste Gulbenkian, Armenian businessman and philanthropist, once the richest man in the world
- Garabet Yazmaciyan, Armenian painter
- Gabriel Noradunkyan, Ottoman Armenian politician
- Yeghishe Tourian, Armenian Patriarch of Jerusalem and Constantinople
- Bedros Tourian, Armenian poet
- Hovhannes Hintliyan, Armenian pedagogue and educator
- Hrand Nazariantz, Armenian poet and writer
- Levon Shant, Armenian poet, writer and playwright
- Sirvart Kalpakyan Karamanuk, Armenian composer, pianist and teacher
- Schahan Berberian, Armenian philosopher, composer and pedagogue
- Srpuhi Kalfayan, Armenian nun and philanthropist
- Zabel Yesayan, Armenian poet, writer and teacher
- Naim Frashëri, Albanian poet, leader of National Albanian Awakening
- Yeranuhi Karakashian, Armenian actress

== Bibliography ==
- Adım Adım İstanbul İnanç Atlası: Camiler, Türbeler, Ziyaret Yerleri, Mezarlıklar. Mapmedya. 2004. ISBN 975-6206-02-0.
- Hürel, Haldun (2008). Semtleri, Mahalleri, Caddeleri ve Sokakları A'dan Z'ye İstanbul'un Alfabetik Öyküsü. İkarus. ISBN 978-975-999-290-3.
- Kumbaracılar, İzzet (2008). İstanbul Sebilleri. Kapı. ISBN 978-9944-486-87-3. (First published 1938)
- Tuğlacı, Pars (1991). İstanbul Ermeni Kiliseleri = Armenian Churches of Istanbul = Istʻanpuli Hayotsʻ ekeghetsʻinerě. Pars. ISBN 975-7423-00-9.
