= Xenophon Sideridis =

Greek historian (1851–1929)

- Born: April 1851; Skoutarion, Konstaniniyye
- Died: 15 August 1929 (aged 78); Athens
- Occupations: Historian, archaeologist, researcher, and library owner
- Organization(s): Academy of Athens, Archaeological Commission

Xenophon Sideridis (Greek: Ξενοφών Σιδερίδης; romanized: Xenofón Siderídis) was a Greek historian specialized in Byzantine History, archaeologist, researcher and member of the Academy of Athens.

== Life ==
Sideridis was born in April 1851 in Skoutarion of Konstaniniyye, then Ottoman Empire (now Üsküdar, Istanbul, Turkey). He had 8 siblings. After graduating from the Greek school of Skoutarion, he worked for a living. He became a shareholder in the commercial business of Chrysvergi. At the same time he learned other languages, Turkish, Russian, Bulgarian and French. He was involved in historical researches very early and published them in the magazine of the Hellenic Philological Association, which belonged to the Archaeological Commission of which he became a chairman. He was elected a member of the Academy of Athens in 1929.

He died on 15 August 1929 from a heart attack.

=== His library ===
The library of Xephophon was considered one of the rarest and largest in its kind, which had approximately 4,009 volumes and 25 manuscript codes. This library was donated by the siblings of Xenophon Sideridis, Evlabia Ahtaris and Alexandra Kourtelis to the Academy of Athens and was housed in a separate room, named «Library of X.A. Sideridis».

== Works ==
Some of his works are the following:

- "Ναός ιερομάρτυρος Αυτονόμου"
- "Βυζαντινά επιτύμβια εν Χρυσπούλει"
- "Περί του Δαματρύος των Βυζαντινών"
- "Περί της εν Μικρά Αρμενία Νικοπόλεως"
- "Βυζαντιναί επιγραφαί"
- "Περί της εν Κωνσταντινουπόλει Μονής της Παμακαρίστου και των κτητόρων αυτής"
- "Περί της εν Κωνσταντινουπόλει Μονής του Σωτήρος του Φιλανθρώπου"
- "Λίβυσσα, Δακίβυζα, Γκέπουζα"
- "Επανόρθωσις αφηγησεως γεγονότων, τινών επί Αυτοκράτορος Ηρακλείου Α"
- "Κωνσταντίνου Παλαιολόγου θάνατος, τάφος, και σπάθη"
- "Περί τινός αντιγράφου του Νομοκανόνος του Μανουήλ Μαλαξού"
- "Γαβριήλ Σεβήρου, ιστορική επιστολή"
- "Γεννάδιου Σχολάριου κανών εις Γρηγόριον Παλαμάν"
- "Η προς Βοεμούς επιστολή της Εκκλησίας Κων/πόλεως εν έτει 1452"
- "Τα περί ενώσεως των Εκκλησιών γράμματα του Αυτοκράτορος Ιωάννου του Κομνηνού"
- "Μιχαήλ Ψελλού λόγος επί τω εν Βλαχέρναις γεγονότι θάυματι"
- "Επιστολαί ΙΣΤ αιώνος"
- "Γεωργίου Σχολαρίου τα ευρισκόμενα"
- "Η Ηπειρώτις οικογένεια Ρερέ (1448-1609)"
- "Ο εν Γενούη βυζαντινός πέπλος"
- "Κορτήσιος Βρανάς ο Ηπειρώτης"
