= Fethi Paşa Korusu =

Park in Istanbul, Turkey

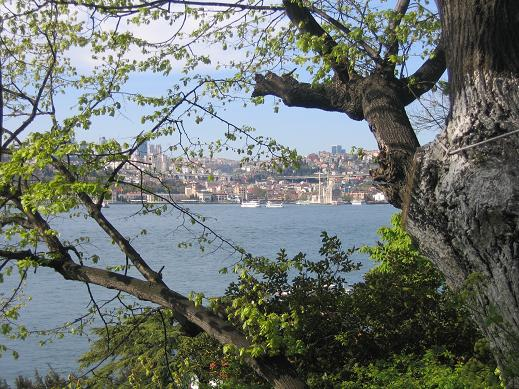
- Fethi Paşa Korusu
- Location: Istanbul, Turkey
- Coordinates: 41°01′49″N 29°01′36″E

Fethi Paşa Korusu (Fethi Pasha Grove) is a large park in Istanbul, Turkey, on the hillside coming right down to the Bosphorus shore in the area called Paşalimanı. It is located between Kuzguncuk and Sultantepe neighborhoods in district Üsküdar on the Asian side of Istanbul. It is named after Ottoman governor, ambassador and minister Fethi Ahmet Pasha. After long years of neglect, it has been recently renovated and opened to public for recreation. It has a scenic view of Bosphorus Bridge and the European side of Istanbul.
