= Paşakapısı Prison =

Prison in Turkey

Coordinates: 41°00′59″N 29°00′51″E

Paşakapısı Prison is a small prison located in Üsküdar district of Istanbul, Turkey. First built in 1799 on orders of the Ottoman sultan Selim III as a hunting palace, the facility was used as a school for nuns between 1918 and 1923. In 1928, it was converted to a prison, which it still is at present day (October 2011). Between 2003 and 2008, it had been exclusively used for housing female prisoners. Today, after female prisoners are moved to another facility in 2008, the building still functions as a prison, allocated, this time, for convicted state employees.

Probably a remote and forested place in 1799, location of the prison is now engulfed by the metropolitan Istanbul, to such an extent that it is considered one of the central locations in the city. Also owing to poor city planning, the prison is now circled by residential and other governmental buildings. The daily functions and activities of the prison reportedly cause disturbances in the daily lives of the nearby residents.
