= Salacak =

Neighbourhood in Istanbul, Turkey

- Neighbourhood
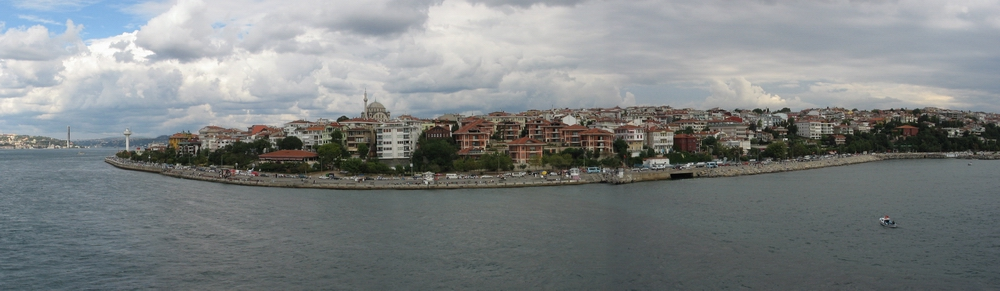
- Panorama of the Salacak neighbourhood

- Location within Turkey Location within Istanbul
- Coordinates: 41°01′14″N 29°00′33″E
- Country: Turkey
- Province: Istanbul
- District: Üsküdar
- Population (2022): 9,522
- Time zone: UTC+3 (TRT)

Salacak is a neighbourhood in the municipality and district of Üsküdar, Istanbul Province, Turkey. Its population is 9,522 (2022). It is located on the Asian shore of the Bosporus, to the south of the historic center of Üsküdar.

The word salacak means "bench for washing a corpse," but the name is reported to come from sala meaning "village" (language unspecified) with the Turkish suffix -cık, "small."

The neighborhood's best-known landmark is the Maiden's Tower (Kız Kulesi), just offshore from Salacak in the Bosporus.
