= List of people from Peja =

The following are notable people who were either born, raised or have lived for a significant period of time in Peja.

== List ==
- Agim Çavdarbasha, Albanians former sculptor
- Agim Çeku, Albanian military commander of the KLA during the Kosovo War, minister of Kosovo Security Force
- Akil Gjakova, Albanian judoka
- Albina Kelmendi, Albanian singer and songwriter
- Antoneta Kastrati, Albanian film director and screenwriter
- Arsenije IV Jovanović Šakabenta, Serbian Patriarch
- Arsenije Sremac, second Archbishop of the Serbian Orthodox Church and first who resided in the Monastery of Peć
- Azem Shkreli, Albanian writer, poet, director and producer
- Bajram Kelmendi, Albanian lawyer and human rights activist
- Bedri Pejani, Albanian politician
- Bekim Berisha, Albanian soldier who fought in the Croatian, Bosnian, and Kosovo wars
- Besim Sahatçiu, Albanian director of theatre and film
- Besnik Lajçi, Kosovo Liberation Army general
- Bogoljub Karić, Serbian politician and businessman
- Çelë Shabani, commander of the Albanian forces of the League of Prizren in 1879
- David Albahari, Serbian author
- Dejan Stojanović, Serbian poet, writer, essayist, philosopher, businessman, and former journalist
- Distria Krasniqi, Albanian judoka Olympic champion
- Distria Krasniqi, Olympic and European judo champion
- Đorđe Božović, Serb paramilitary leader
- Đorđe Ristić Skopljanče, Serbian chetnik
- Enver Hadri, Albanian human rights activist
- Ethem Çeku, officer of Kosovo Liberation Army, historian and politician
- Fadil Muriqi, Albanian former football player, part of the "Golden Generation" of FC Prishtina
- Faruk Begolli, Albanian actor
- Fatos Bećiraj, Albanian football player, who plays for the Montenegro national team
- Gazmend Muhaxheri, Albanian politician and mayor of Peja
- Gezim Kasapolli, Albanian politician
- Haxhi Zeka, Albanian national leader
- Joanikije II, Serbian Patriarch
- Kamer Qaka, Albanian footballer
- Majlinda Kelmendi, Albanian Olympic, World and European judo champion
- Mark Krasniqi, Albanian ethnographist, publicist, writer and translator
- Mehmet Akif Ersoy, Turkish poet, who wrote the Turkish National Anthem
- Milutin Šoškić, Serbian former football player, Olympic champion
- Miodrag Krivokapić, Serbian actor
- Mrika Nikçi, Albanian mountaineer
- Nuredin Loxha, Albanian librettist, set designer, production designer and costume designer
- Pavle Strugar, retired Montenegrin general in the Yugoslav People's Army (JNA)
- Qerim Begolli, signatory of the Albanian Declaration of Independence
- Ramiz Sadiku, Albanian organizer of the anti-fascist uprising in Kosovo
- Ranko Popović, Serbian former football player and a current coach
- Rina Balaj, Albanian rapper and singer
- Riza Sapunxhiu, Albanian politician
- Rustemi Kreshnik, Albanian kickboxer
- Saint Sava, first Archbishop of the Serbian Orthodox Church and founder of the Monastery of Peć
- Sali Jaha, Albanian soldier and resistance fighter within the League of Prizren in Kosovo during the 19th century.
- Salih Gjuka, Albanian Albanian Albanian participant in the signatory of the Albanian Declaration of Independence
- Shemsi Pasha, Albanian-Ottoman general
- Shkodran Metaj, Albanian footballer
- Sislej Xhafa, Albanian artist
- Skënder Rizaj, Albanian scholar and historian
- Veljko Radenović, Serbian police lieutenant colonel
- Vladimir Božović, Montenegrin football player
- Xhavit Haliti, Albanian politician, philosopher, linguist and one of the founders of the Kosovo Liberation Army
- Xhevat Kelmendi, Albanian Albanian participant in the singer
- Xhevdet Muriqi, Albanian former football player, part of the "Golden Generation" of FC Prishtina
- Zhuj Selmani, Albanian participant in the League of Prizren
