= Şemsi =

Şemsi is a unisex Turkish given name. It may refer to:

== People ==
- Şemsi Pasha (died 1580), Ottoman nobleman and beylerbey
- Shemsi Pasha (1846 – 1908), Ottoman general
- Şemsi Yaralı (born 1982), Turkish boxer
- Shemsi Beqiri (born 1986), Swiss-Albanian boxer
- Şemsi Efendi (1851-1917), Ottoman teacher.

== Other ==
- Şemsipaşa, Gaziosmanpaşa, a neighborhood of Istanbul's Gaziosmanpaşa district
- Şemsi Pasha Mosque, an Ottoman mosque in Istanbul's Üsküdar district
- Şemsipaşa Primary School, in Istanbul's Üsküdar district
- Shemsi (Also spelt Shamsi), a former sun-worshipping sect in Upper Mesopotamia

== See also ==
- Shamsi (disambiguation)
