= Gëzim =

- Gender: Male
- Language: Albanian

Origin
- Meaning: joy
- Region of origin: Albania, Kosovo

Gëzim is an Albanian masculine given name. It is derived from the Albanian word gëzim, meaning "joy."

People with the name Gëzim include:

- Gëzim Alpion (b. 1962), Albanian sociologist, philosopher and educator
- Gëzim Boçari (b. ????), Albanian politician, physician and writer
- Gëzim Dibra (1956 – 2011), Albanian politician
- Gëzim Erebara (1929 – 2007), Albanian film director, screen player, translator and cinematography
- Gëzim Gashi (b. 1990), Kosovar-Swedish singer
- Gëzim Hajdinaga (b. 1964), Montenegrin-Albanian politician, former member of Democratic Union of Albanians
- Gëzim Hyska (b. 1995), Albanian association football player
- Gëzim Kasapolli (b. 1976), Kosovan politician and diplomat
- Gëzim Kasmi (1942–2016), Albanian footballer
- Gëzim Krasniqi (b. 1990), Kosovar footballer
- Gëzim Morina (b. 1992), Slovene basketball player
- Gëzim Ostreni (b. 1942), KLA and NLA general
- Gëzim Shalaj (b. 1990), Swiss association football player
- Gëzim Tafa (b. ????), Albanian publisher
