= Shamsi (name) =

Shamsi (Arabic: شمسی) (Persian: شمسی) is a given name and a family name, which is commonly found in the Middle East, South Asia, and North Africa. People with this name include:

== People with the given name Shamsi ==
- Shamsi Ali (born 1967), Indonesian Muslim scholar
- Shamsi Asadullayev (1840–1913), Azerbaijani businessman and philanthropist
- Shamsi Badalbeyli (1911–1987), Azerbaijani theatre director
- Shamsi Fazlollahi (born 1941), Iranian actress
- Shamsi Hekmat (1917–1997), Iranian woman who pioneered reforms
- Shamsi Vuai Nahodha (born 1962) Tanzanian politician

== People with the surname Shamsi ==
- Baseer Shamsi (1922–2015), Pakistani soldier and cricketer
- Tabraiz Shamsi, South African cricketer
- Tahir Shamsi (1962–2021), Pakistani physician

== Etymology ==
The word Shamsi means "of sun", "sunny", or "solar". The name can also mean "a disciple of Shams", in reference to communities in Pakistan, India and Syria that were descendent or converted to Islam by Sufi Saints, [Shaikh Shamsudin-Baray Sarkar and Shaikh Badar ud Din-Chotay Sarkar of Badaun UP, India 1206-1280 CE], Shamsuddin Sabzwari and Shahjamal Shamsul Arifeen (Aligarh).

== See also ==
- Shamsi (disambiguation)
- Shams (disambiguation)
- Muslim Khatris
