= Al-Shams =

Al-Shams is the Arabic word for "the sun" (الشمس) and may refer to:

- Ash-Shams, the 91st Sura of the Quran
- Shamash, the Semitic Sun god (unrelated to Islam)
- Ain Shams University, a university located in Cairo, Egypt
- Majdal Shams, a Druze town in the Golan Heights (Migdal Shemesh in Hebrew)
- Al-Shams (newspaper), a Libyan newspaper in Arabic
- Al-Shams (East Pakistan), a paramilitary wing of several parties in East Pakistan abolished in 1971
- Shams Abu Dhabi, a real estate development on Al Reem Island, Abu Dhabi, United Arab Emirates

== See also ==
- Shams (disambiguation)
