= Shams =

Shams (Arabic: شمس), an Arabic word meaning sun or spark may refer to:

== Media ==
- "Shams", a 2019 song by Indian singer Sanjeeta Bhattacharya
- Shams (newspaper), a defunct Saudi newspaper
- Al-Shams (newspaper), a Libyan government newspaper until 2011
- Network for Public Policy Studies, an Iranian website

== Places ==
- Ain Shams, a neighborhood in Cairo, Egypt
- Kafr Shams, a city in southern Syria
- Majdal Shams, a village in the Golan Heights
- Shams-e Bijar, a village in Gilan Province, Iran
- Shams Abu Dhabi, a real estate development on Al Reem Island, Abu Dhabi, United Arab Emirates
- Shams Solar Power Station, a planned concentrating solar power station in the United Arab Emirates

== Other uses ==
- Shams (deity), a solar deity in the ancient South Arabian religion
- Shams (name), a list of people with the name
- Shams al-Ma'arif, a 13th-century Arabic book
- Ain Shams University, a university located in Cairo, Egypt
- Ash-Shams, the 91st surah of the Quran
- Shams, a kind of decorative pillow
- The Shams, an all-female folk pop trio from New York
- Association Shams, a Tunisian organization for LGBT rights
- Jebel Shams, a mountain in Oman
- Thee Shams, an American garage rock band

== See also ==
- Shamsi (disambiguation)
- Sham (disambiguation)
- Al-Shams (disambiguation)
- Shamss Ensemble, a music group performing Iranian and Sufi music
- Shamash, the solar deity in ancient Semitic religion
- Shamish, the Sun in Mandaeism
