= Shamsi =

Shamsi means of sun or solar in Arabic. It may refer to:

== Places ==
- Samsi, Malda, city in West Bengal, India
- Shamsi, Iran
- Shamsi, Nepal
- Shamsi airfield, Balochistan, Pakistan
- Shamshy, a village in Naryn Region, Kyrgyzstan
- Shamshy, Chuy, a village in Chuy Region, Kyrgyzstan

== People ==
- Shamsi (name), a family name
- Samsi (Also spelt Shamsi), an Arab queen who reigned in the 8th century BC
- Pertaining to or related to Shams ud-Din Iltutmish, Sultan of Delhi (r. 1211–1236)
  - Jama Masjid, Shamsi, mosque in Badaun, Uttar Pradesh, India

== Other ==
- The Shamsīyah, a Mesopotamian sun-worshipping group
- Shamsi Calendar, also known as the Iranian calendar
- Shamsi (Also spelt Shemsi), a former sun-worshipping cult in Upper Mesopotamia

== See also ==
- Şemsi (disambiguation)
- Shams (disambiguation)
