= Rum Mehmed Pasha Mosque =

Mosque in Üsküdar, Istanbul, Turkey

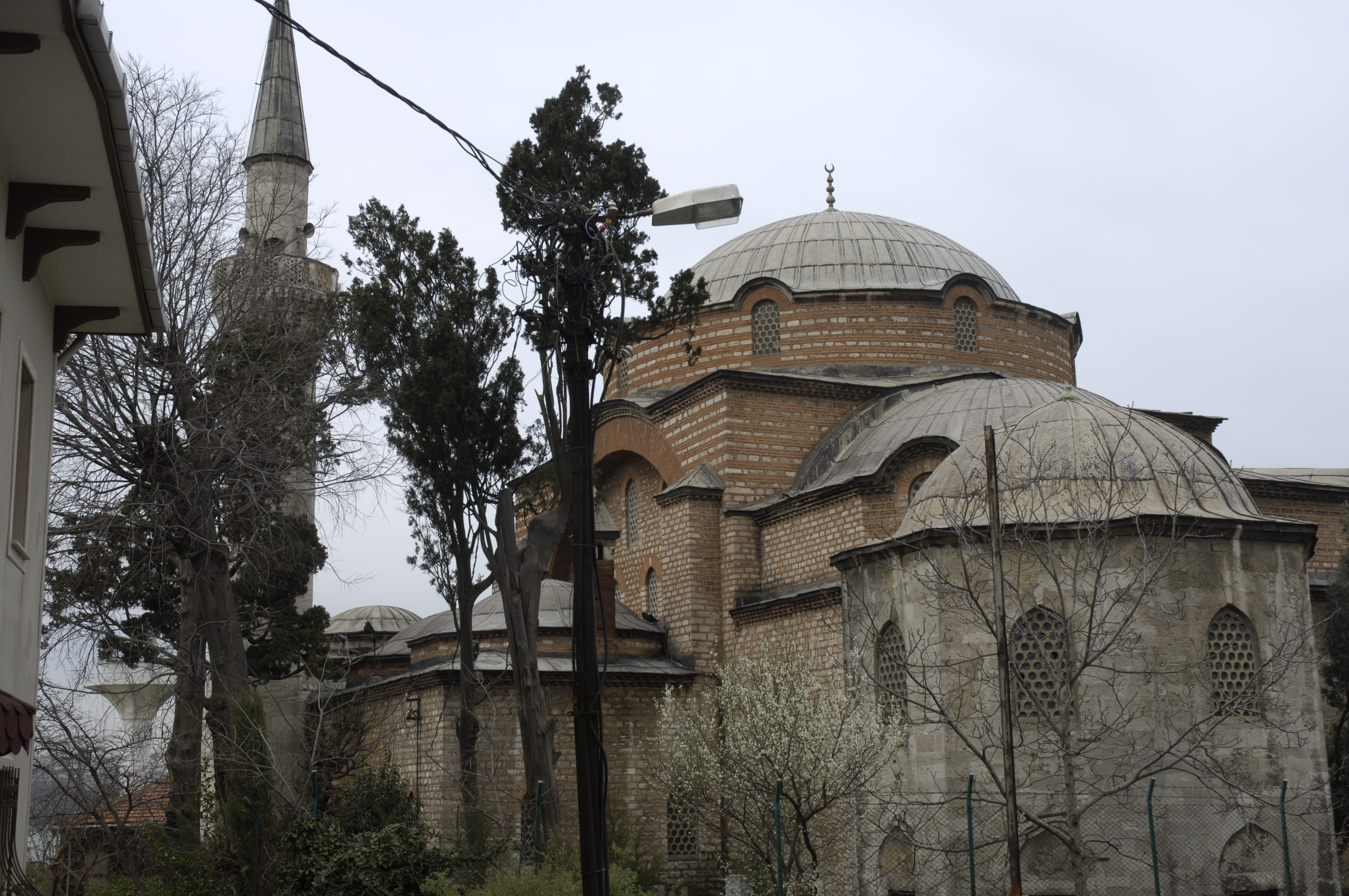

- Location in Istanbul

Religion
- Affiliation: Islam

Location
- Location: Istanbul, Turkey
- Coordinates: 41.024651°N 29.010859°E

Architecture
- Type: Mosque
- Style: Ottoman architecture, Byzantine architecture
- Groundbreaking: 1469
- Completed: 1471
- Minaret: 1

The Rum Mehmed Pasha Mosque (Turkish: Rum Mehmet Paşa Camii) is an old Ottoman mosque located in a large and densely populated district of Üsküdar, in Istanbul, Turkey.

Rum Mehmed Pasha Mosque is located close to the Bosphorus waterfront and Şemsi Pasha, Yeni Valide and Mihrimah Sultan historical mosques located in the Üsküdar district. It is the first mosque to be built on the Asian (Anatolian) side of Istanbul following its takeover and collapse of the Eastern Roman Empire.

== History ==
The mosque was built in 1471 for the Grand Vizier Rum Mehmed Pasha, who was of Greek origin, and as such his epithet “Rum” meaning Roman, since the Greeks of the Eastern Roman (Byzantine) Empire referred to themselves as “Romans”. The mosque combines architectural elements of Ottoman and Byzantine styles, built of stone and brick. It was restored in 1953.

== Gallery ==
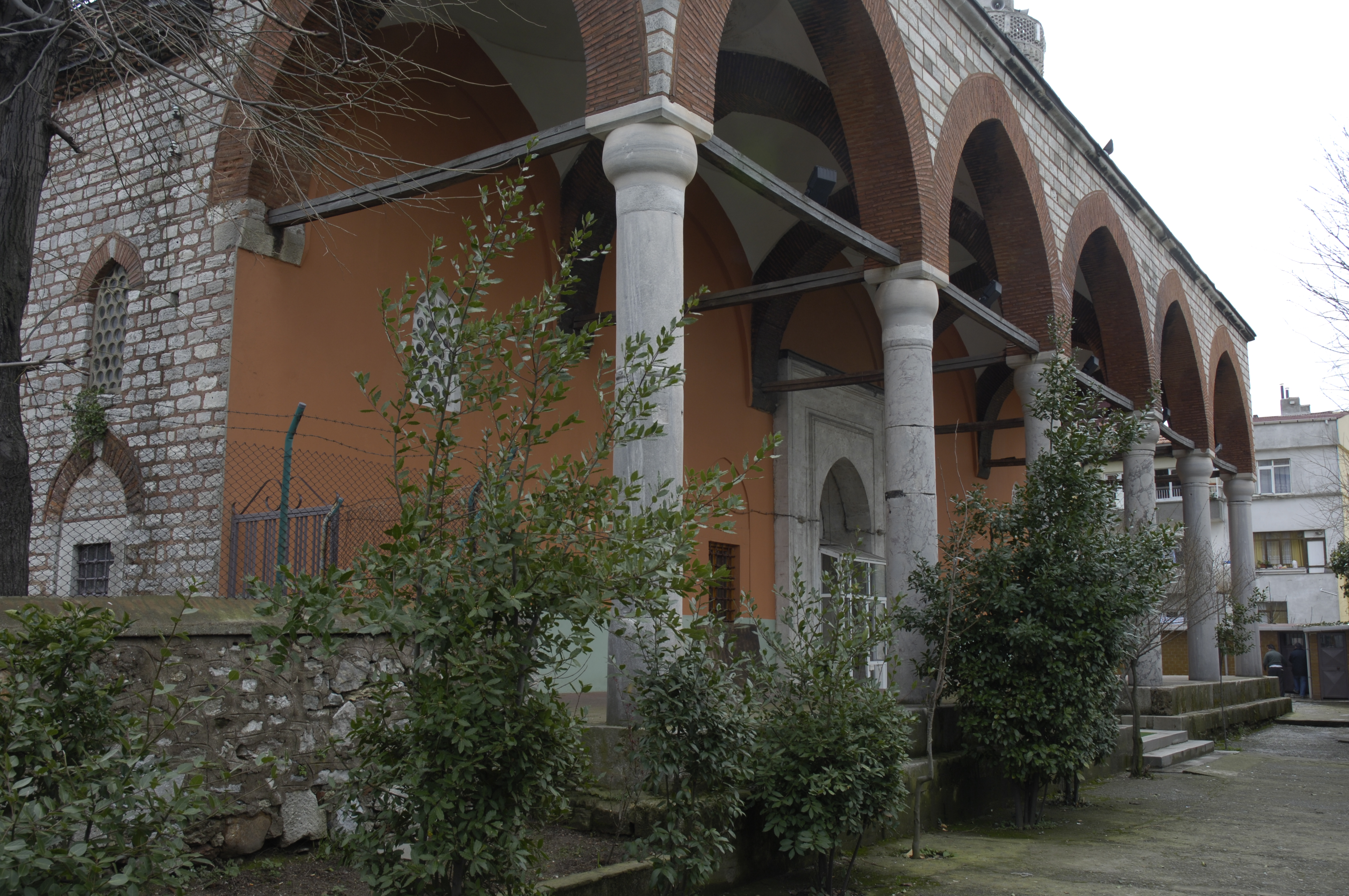
Rumi Mehmet Pasha Camii facade

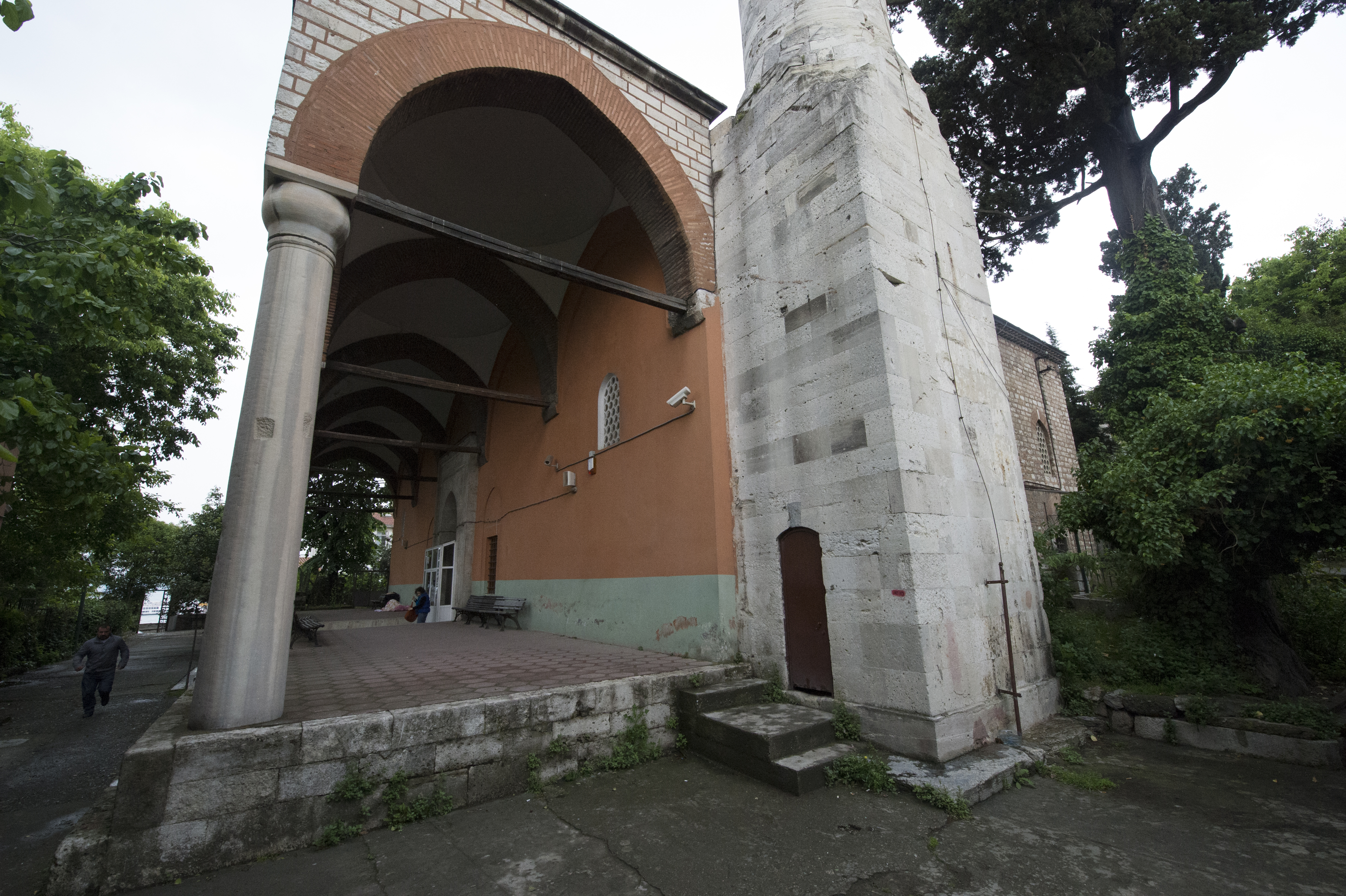
Rumi Mehmet Pasha Camii side of son cemaat area

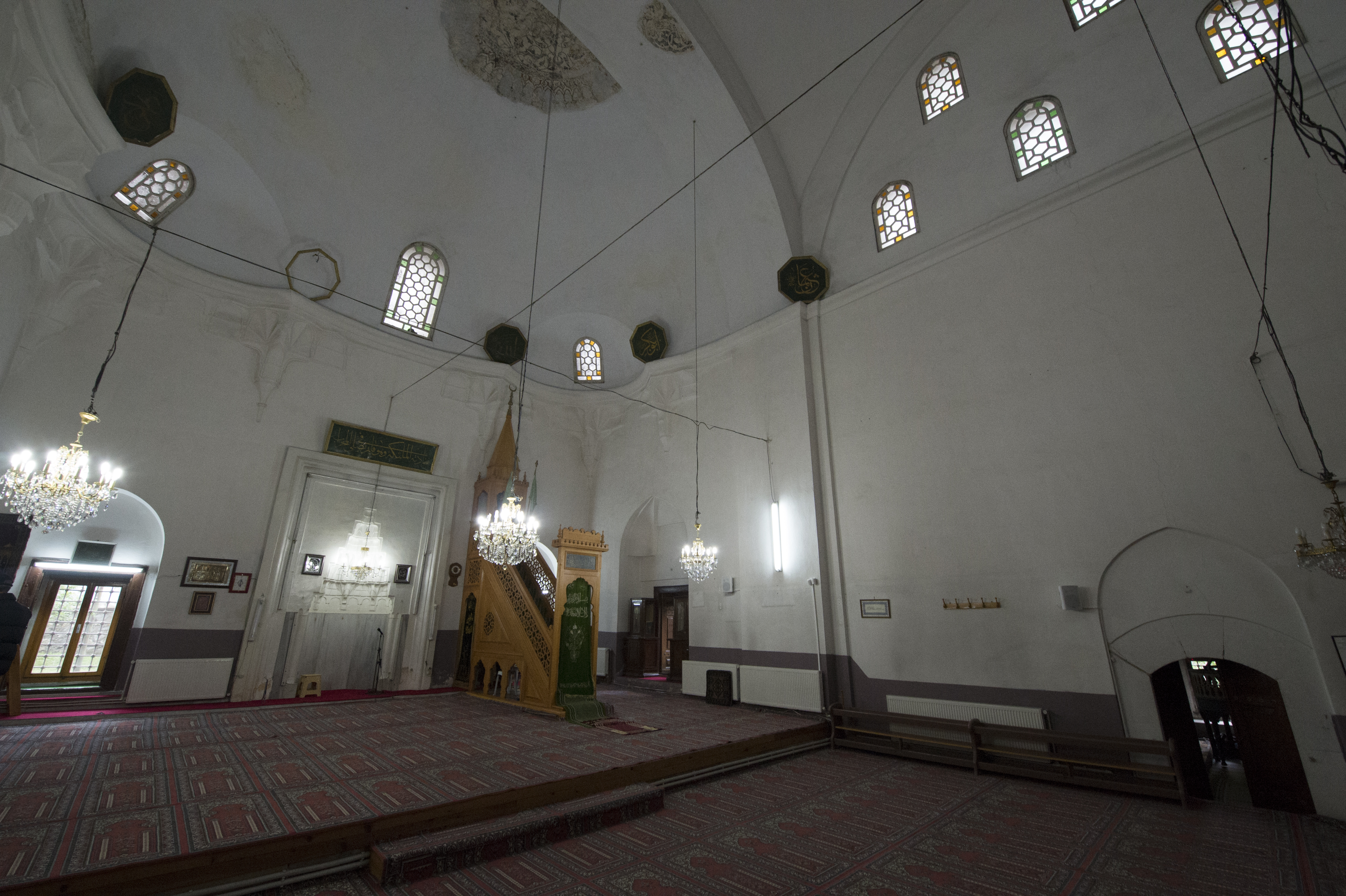
Rumi Mehmet Pasha Camii interior

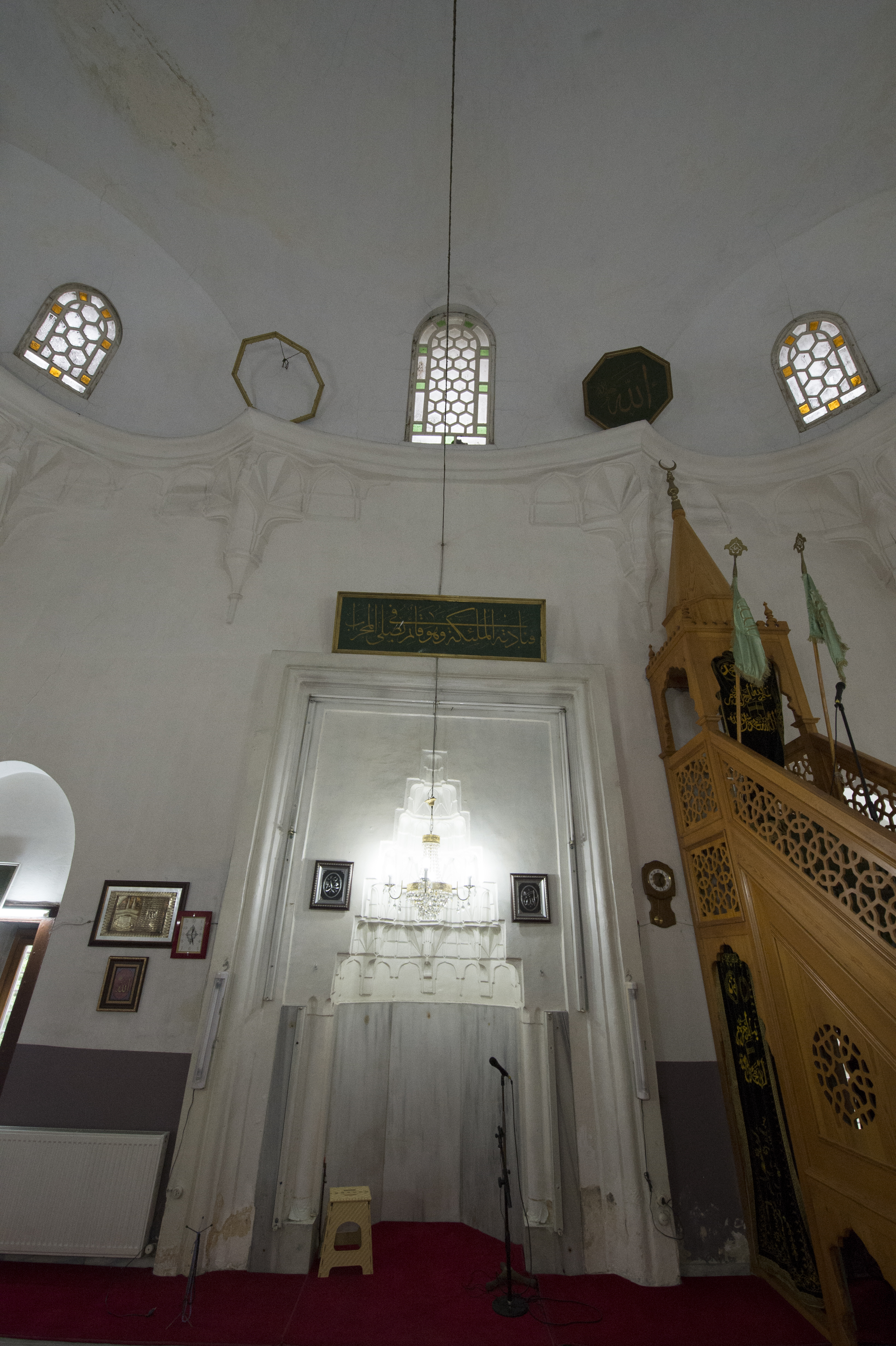
Rumi Mehmet Pasha Camii minber and mihrab

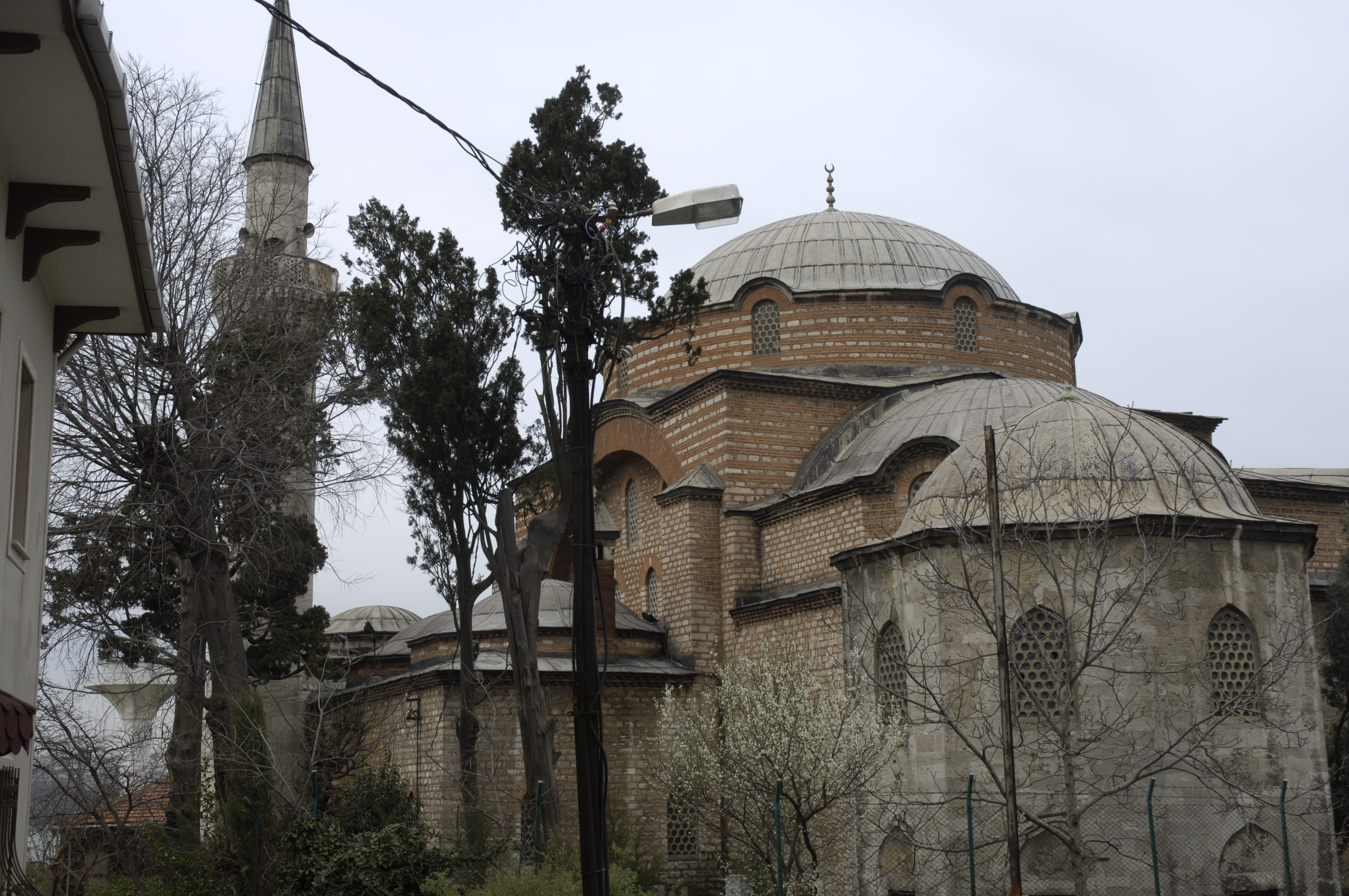
Rumi Mehmet Pasha Camii view from back side

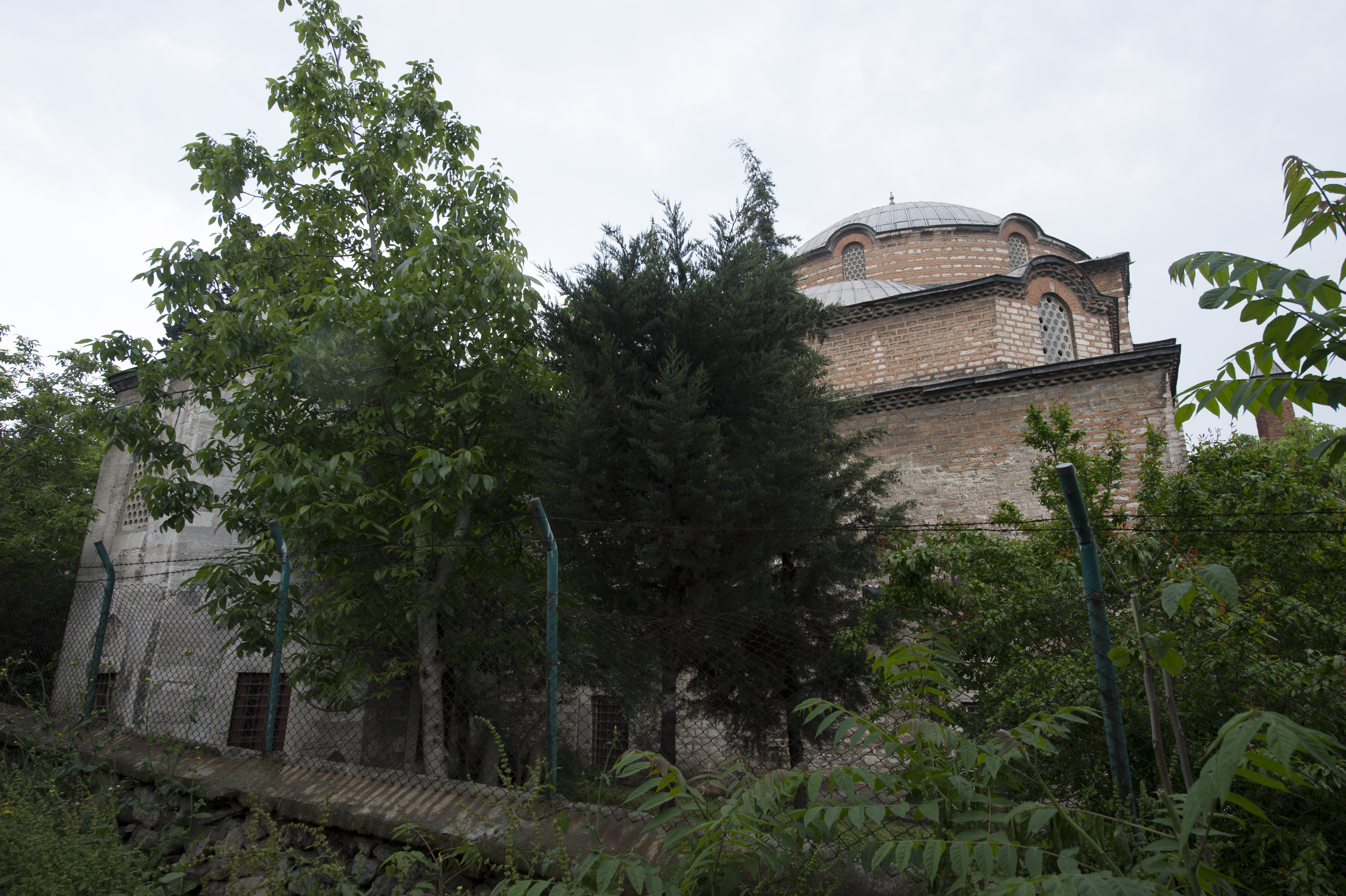
Rumi Mehmet Pasha Camii from the street

== See also ==
- Islamic architecture
- List of mosques
- Ottoman architecture
