= Mrika Nikçi =

Albanian mountaineer (born 2001)

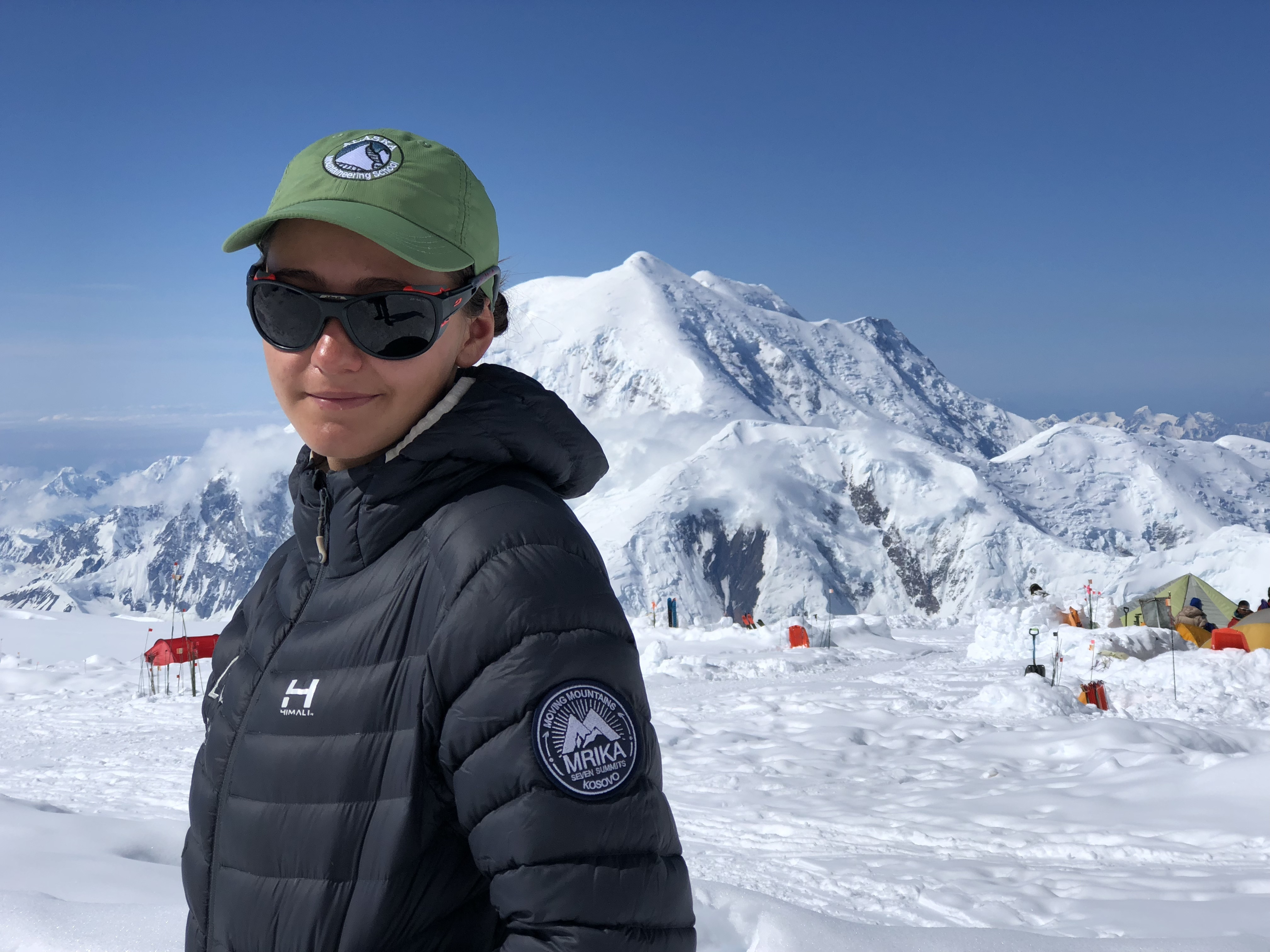
- Mrika on the mountain
- Born: Mrika Arianit Nikçi; December 6, 2001 (age 24); Peja, Kosovo
- Citizenship: Kosovar and Albanian
- Occupation: Student
- Known for: The youngest female in the world to climb Seven Summits, first Albanian to climb Seven Summits
- Parent(s): Arianit Nikçi, Albanina Taraku Nikçi

Mrika Nikçi (born December 6, 2001) is an Albanian mountaineer from the Republic of Kosovo. She has scaled the Seven Summits and five of the Volcanic Seven Summits.

She is the first Albanian and the youngest female in the world to climb the Seven Summits. On 15 August 2019, as a seventeen years old, she became the youngest female in the world to climb all the Seven Summits, together with her father Arianit Nikçi(Albanian mountaineer). They became the first Albanians to summit all the Seven Summits. They reached all the Seven Summits for 17 months, six hardest peaks (Vinson, Aconcagua, Everest, Denali, Elbrus and Carstensz Pyremid) summit-ed for 240 days (eight months). They reached this goal following their project Mrika Seven Summits. After their success, they have appeared in almost all Albanian media and have been an attraction with their interviews She has also appeared at International media expressing her experiences

== Early life ==
She was born in Peja, Republic of Kosovo where she now lives. She started her karate training when she was just 7 years old. She was the champion of Kosovo in Kata and Kumite. Mrika also has a black belt grade. Mrika was also a very successful ski competitor.

== Mountain climbing career ==
Mrika with the support of her father, who accompanies her in all mountaineering activities, has begun with mountaineering when she was 13 years old. Mrika has climbed national and regional summits such as:

- Gjeravica (2,656m), winter climb (highest peak of Kosovo)
- Jezerca (2,694m), winter climb, highest peak in the Dinaric Alps in Albania
- Korab (2,794m) (Macedonia–Albania border), the highest peak in Albania, winter climb
- Hajla (2,403m) winter climbing (Kosovo)
- Maja e Titos (2,747m)-winter climb (Macedonia)
- Maja e Zezë (2,528m)–winter climbing (Kosovo)

During 2017 Mrika has continued with her mountaineering activities by climbing 2 summits in Bulgaria, specifically the summit of the Seven Lakes in Rila with an altitude (alt) of 2,648 meters, and the summit of Musala 2,925 alt, the highest peak in Balkan. Also, during 2017 Mrika has attempted the climbing of other European summits. Due to the weather conditions that have undermined the safety of the mountaineers participating in the expedition, these summit attempts will need to repeat:

1. Mount Blanc– 4,880 m – attempt and climb up to the alt of 3,700 m (France).
2. Grand Paradiso– 4,061m – attempt and climb up to the alt of 3,650 m (Italy).

In 2018 Mrika has continued with mountaineering and achieved additional success by climbing to another 2 summits, specifically Grossglockner - 3,798 alt (Austria), and one of the Seven World Summits, the summit of Kilimanjaro - 5,895 alt (Tanzania - Africa).

== Seven Summits Challenge ==
Based on the success achieved so far and her will to reach a world class level, Mrika and her father have begun preparations for the accomplishment of the Seven World Summits Challenge, and climbed all the seven summits by the following itinerary:

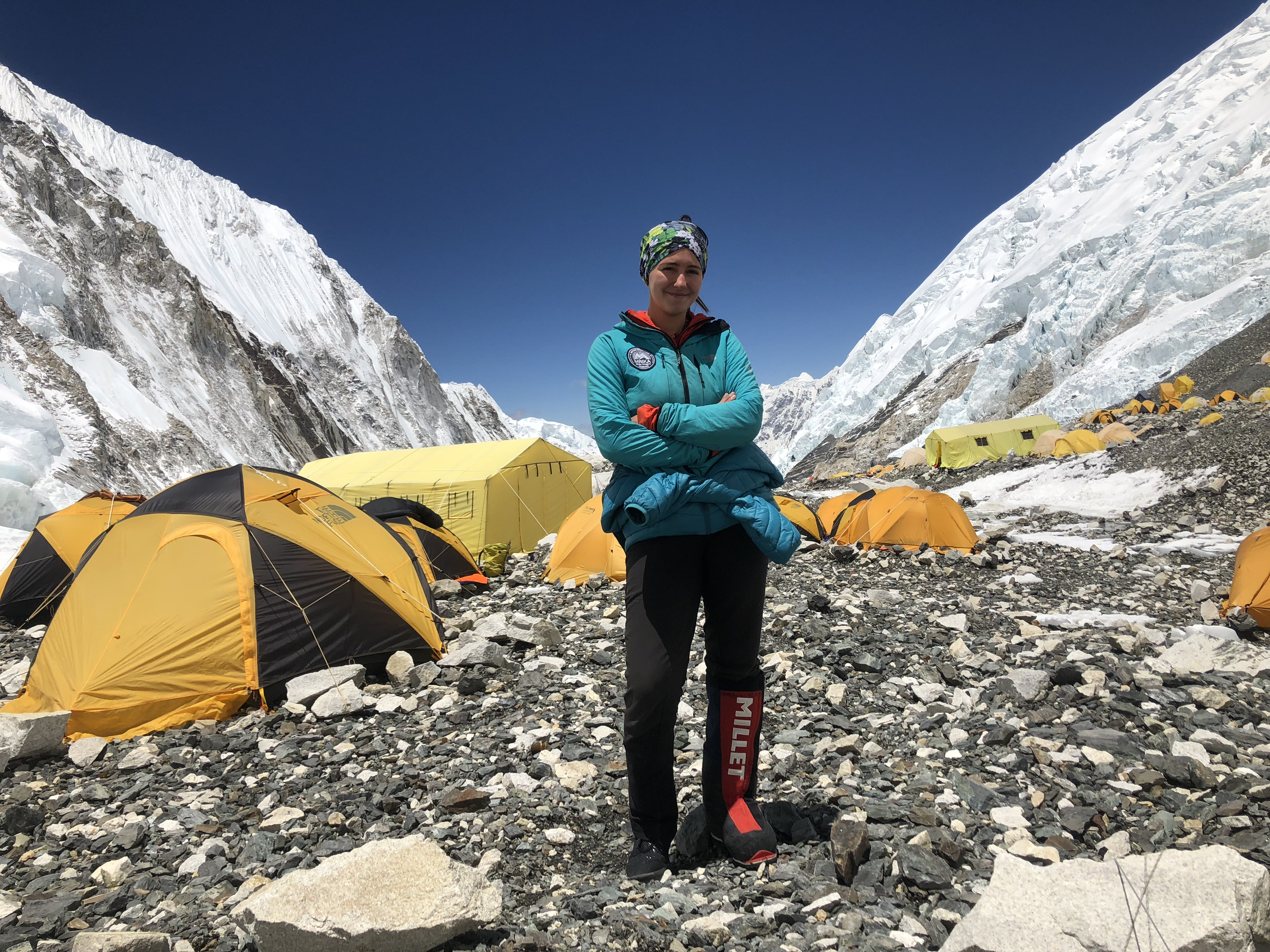
Mrika at the Everest Base Camp

1. Kilimanjaro - Africa (5,895m), climbed January 29, 2018
2. Vinson - Antarctica (4,892m), climbed on December 16, 2018
3. Aconcagua - South America (6,962m), climbed 16 February 2019
4. Mount Everest - Asia (8,848m), climbed 27 May 2019
5. Denali - North America (6,194m) climbed on 20 June 2019
6. Mount Elbrus - Russia (5,642m), climbed on 20 July 2019
7. Carstensz Pyramid - Indonesia (4,884m), climbed on 15 August 2019

During her challenge she has experienced difficulties that each mountaineer dream off. During the Mount Everest Summit she has avoided the risks by cleverly choosing the time where to climb. In here interview with CNN she said :

"You know what, when you decide to come and climb Everest, you prepare yourself that you are going to see dead bodies," Mrika adds. "Maybe something can happen to you, your father, or whoever you're climbing with, so you prepare. You see a dead body and it's like, it's ok. He's gone. I don't want to be like him; I have to move on."

"We saw dead bodies along the way. I think that maybe this could reflect negatively on her -- she's only 17 -- but no, she passed that," Arianit (her father) says.

== Mountains climbed ==
Noted summits Mrika has climbed
Year	Summits	Country	Continent	Elevation m
29 January 2018	Kilimanjaro	Tanzania	Africa	5,895
16 December 2018	Vinson Massif	N/A	Antarctica	4,892
16 February 2019	Aconcagua	Argentina	South America	6,962
27 May 2019	Mount Everest	Nepal - China	Asia	8,848
20 June 2019	Denali	United States	North America	6,194
20 July 2019	Mount Elbrus	Russia	Europe	5,642
15 August 2019	Carstensz Pyramid	Indonesia	Asia	4,884

== Gallery ==
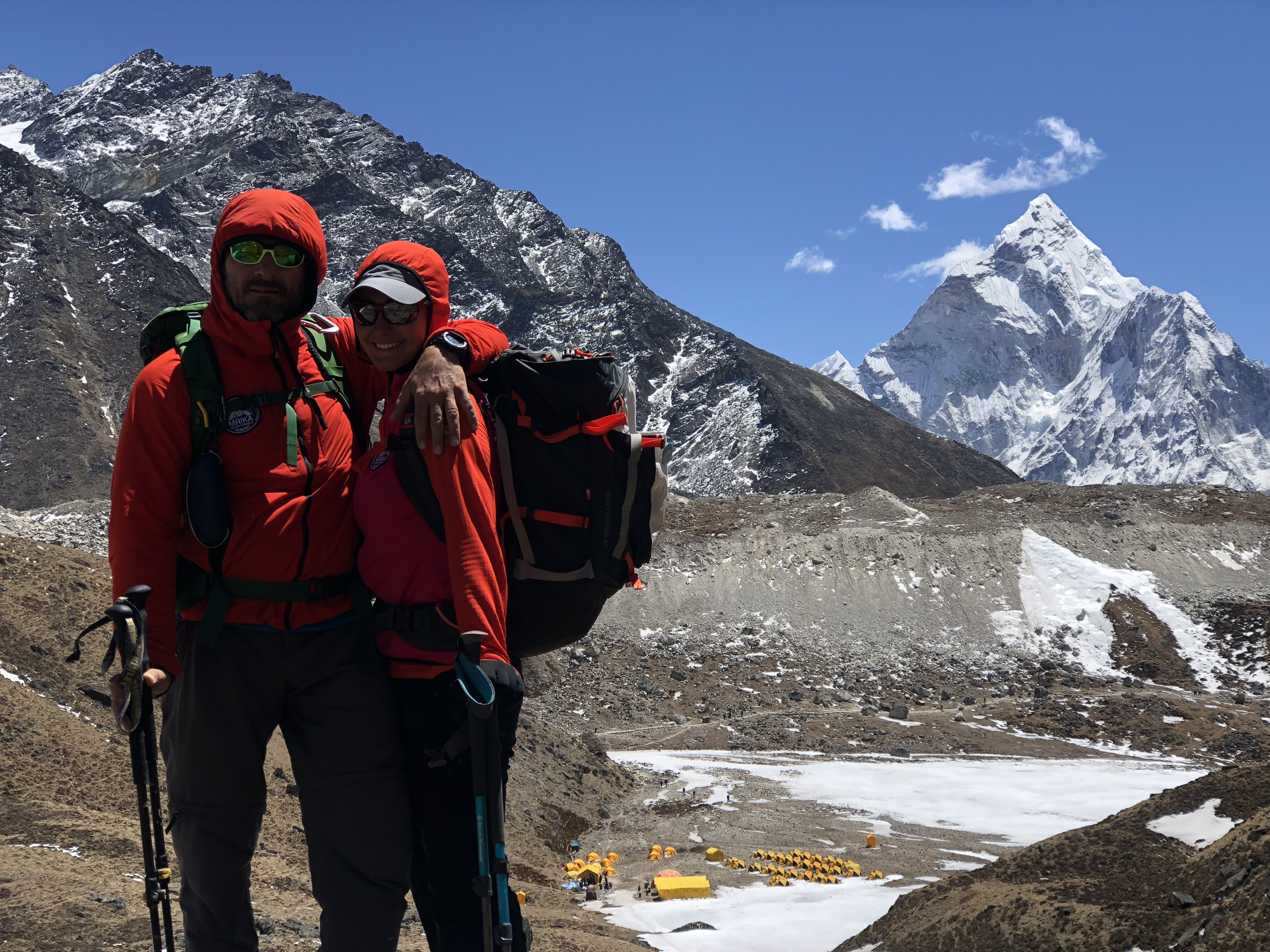
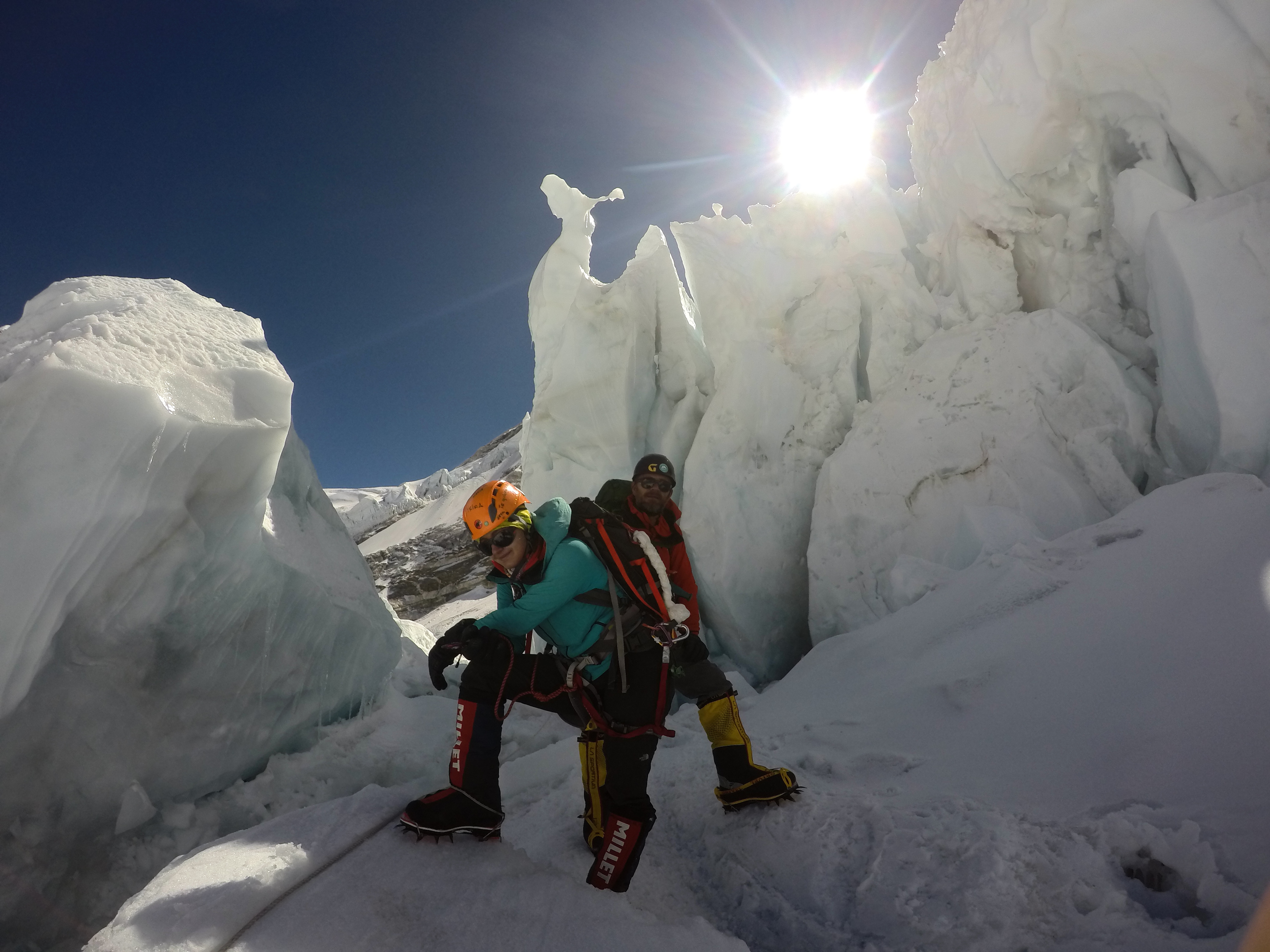
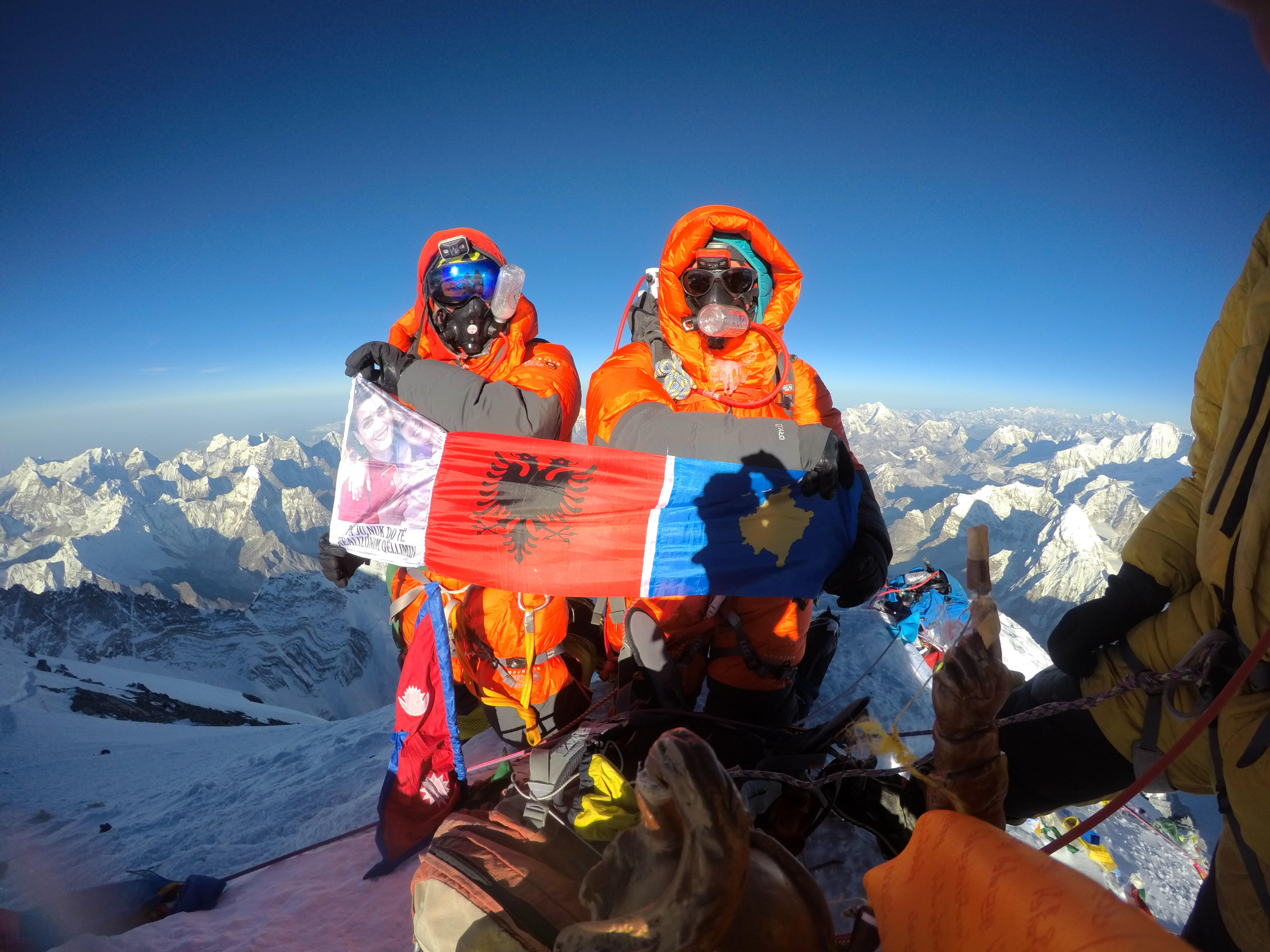
