= Şemsi Pasha Mosque =

Mosque in Üsküdar, Istanbul, Turkey

- شمسى پاشا جامع
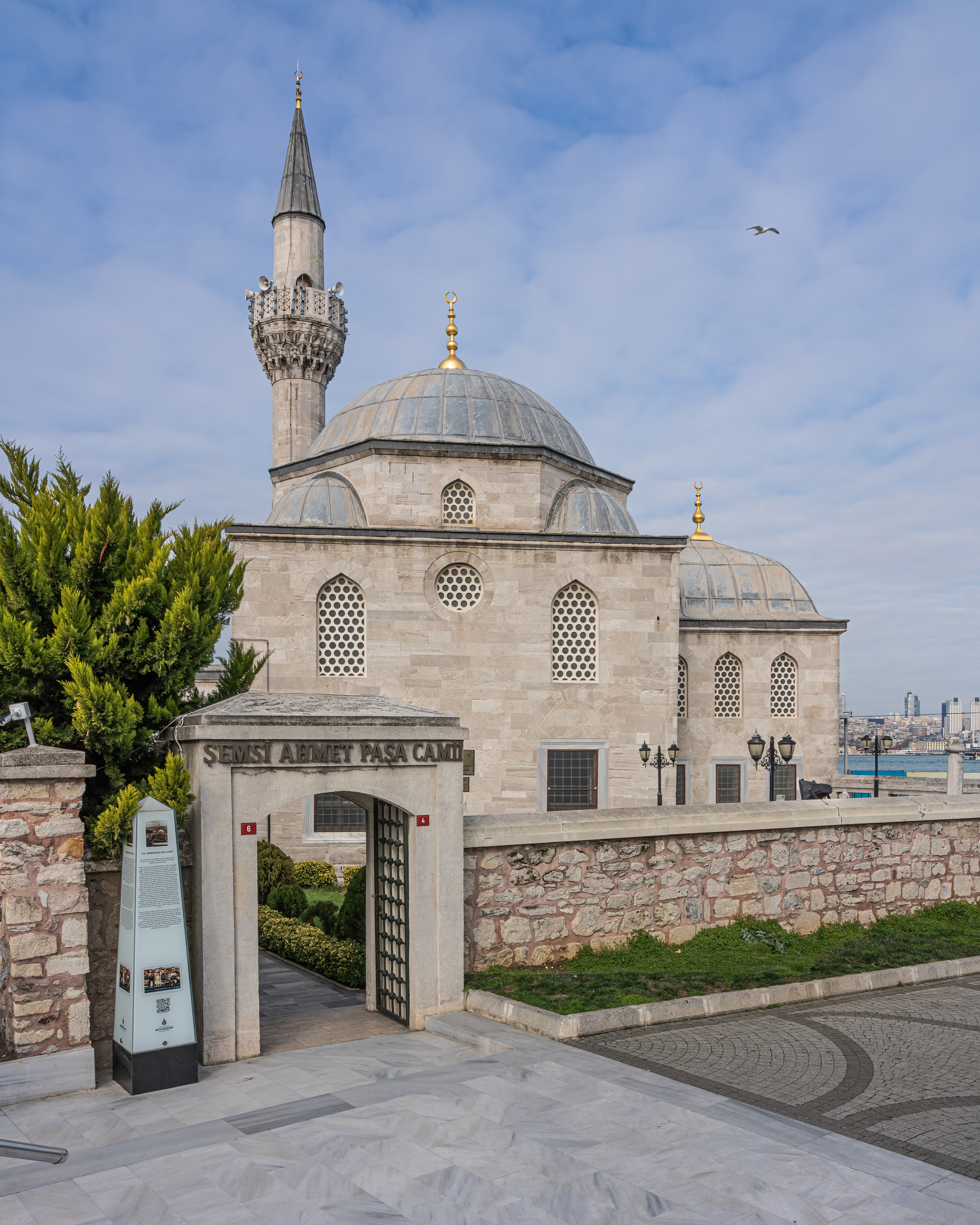

- Location in Istanbul

Religion
- Affiliation: Sunni Islam

Location
- Location: Istanbul, Turkey
- Coordinates: 41°01′33″N 29°00′41″E

Architecture
- Architect: Mimar Sinan
- Type: Mosque
- Groundbreaking: 1580
- Completed: 1581

Specifications
- Dome dia. (outer): 8.2 m (27 ft)
- Minaret: 1
- Materials: granite, marble, tiles

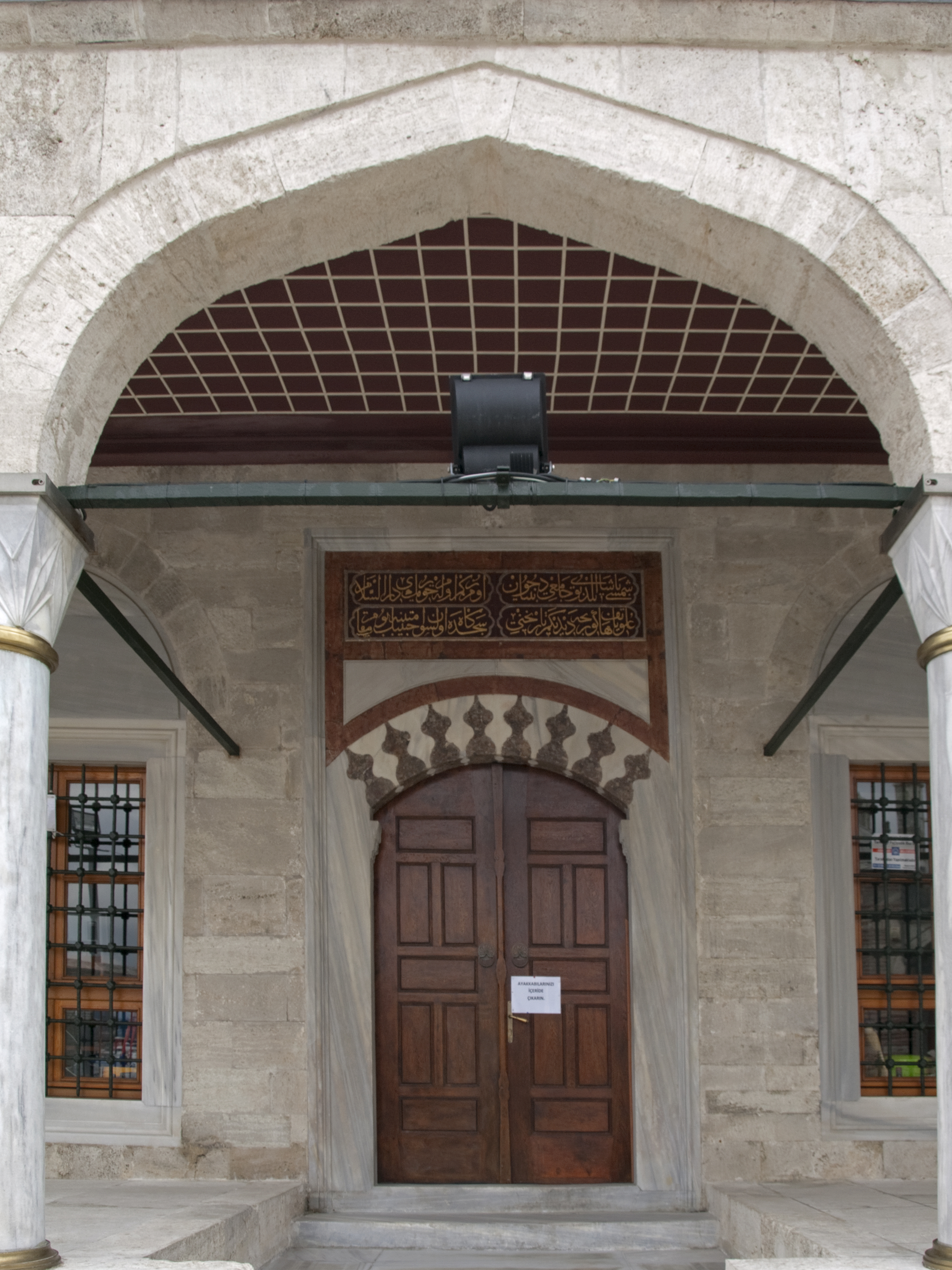
The entrance to the mosque

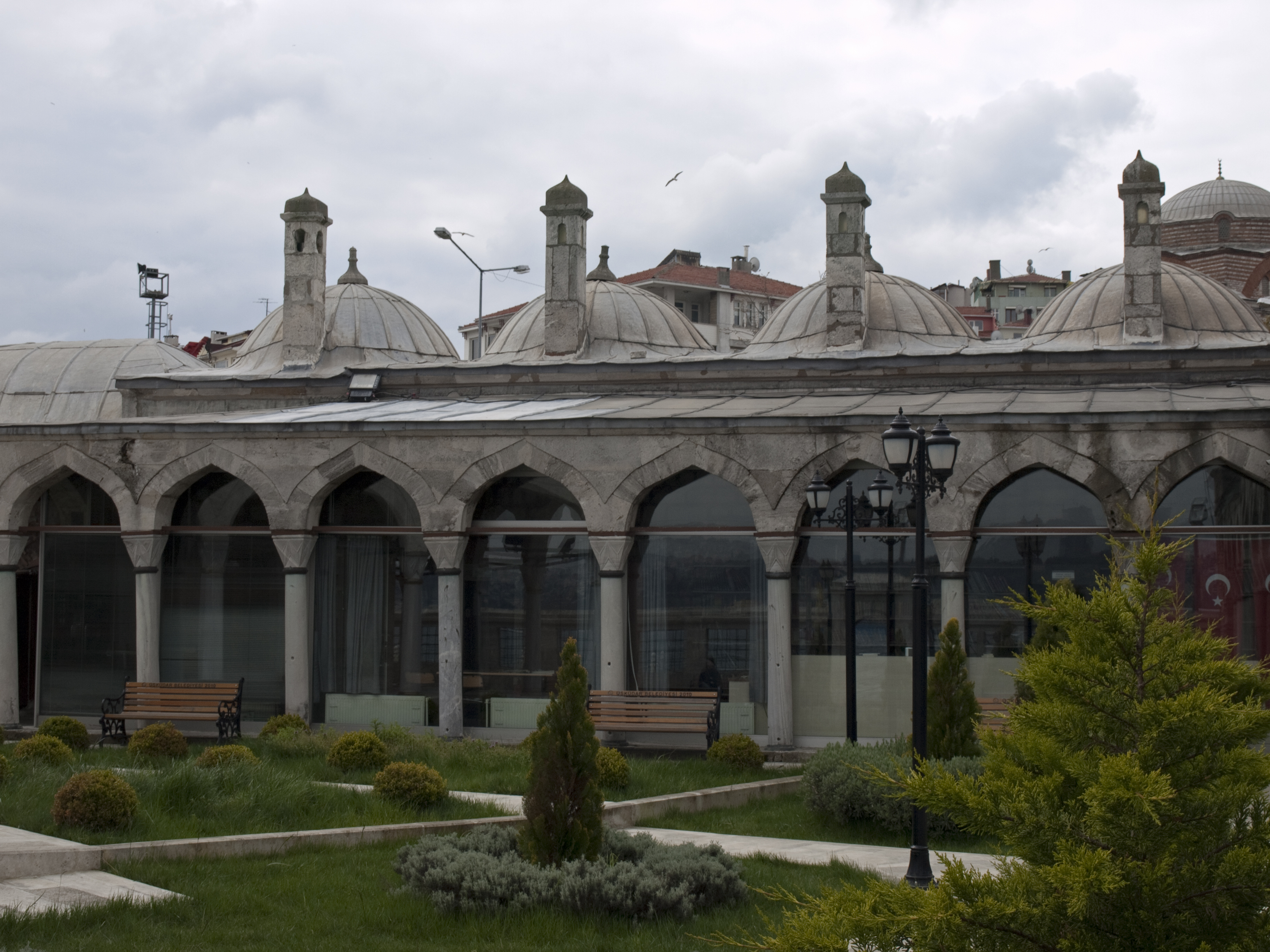
The madrasa

The Şemsi Pasha Mosque (Turkish: Şemsi Paşa Camii; Ottoman Turkish: شمسى پاشا جامع) is an Ottoman mosque located in the large and densely populated district of Üsküdar, in Istanbul, Turkey.

== History ==
The Şemsi Pasha Mosque was designed by Ottoman imperial architect Mimar Sinan for Şemsi Pasha. The Mosque is one of the smallest of Mimar Sinan's works in Istanbul, however its miniature dimensions combined with its picturesque waterfront location have made it one of the most attractive mosques in the city. The Mosque is a celebrated example of the chief architect's skill in organically blending architecture with the natural landscape.

== Architecture ==
The complex stands on a roughly rectangular site aligned east–west with the Bosphorus shoreline. The square, single domed mosque abuts the coast at an angle, with the adjoining mausoleum of the donor projecting towards the waterfront. The garden, which over-looks the Bosphorus, is surrounded on two sides by the madrasa, with the mosque on the third side and the sea wall on the fourth. The mosque itself is unusual in that the tomb of Şemsi Pasha is joined to the main building, divided from the interior by a grille. The chamber is crowned by a mirror vault at the height of the prayer hall drum. It has three casement windows facing the Bosphorus and nine upper windows on three walls, adorned with coloured glass. Surrounding the Mosque is a larger complex, situated on the coast of Üsküdar, also built by court architect Sinan near the Şemsi Pasha Palace and, according to the inscription over the mosque portal, construction was completed in 1580. In 1940, an extensive restoration project was undertaken by the General Directorate of Religious Endowments, supervised by architect Süreyya Yücel. The complex stands on a roughly rectangular site aligned east–west with the Bosphorus shoreline. The square, single domed mosque abuts the coast at an angle, with the adjoining tomb of the donor projecting towards the waterfront. Its precinct is enclosed by an L-shaped madrasa to the west and south, and a seawall with grill-windows to the north, giving the impression that one is in a picture gallery looking at framed Bosphorus seascapes. The complex has two gates, one facing the land and the other facing the sea; the land gate opens to a private walled cemetery which occupies the eastern precinct, behind the mosque's qibla wall, which has become a burial site for generations of Şemsi Pasha.

A gate along the seawall opens into the precinct courtyard, which is shared by the mosque and the madrasa. A secondary gate along the cemetery wall to the east also leads to this courtyard via a narrow passage. The mosque portico, which envelops the prayer hall to the northwest and southwest, is faced across the courtyard with the madrasa arcade, at a smaller scale. Both the portico and arcade are covered by shed roofs and have pointed arches carried on columns with diamond-cut capitals. The mosque portico was rebuilt during the 1940 restoration. A single minaret with a single balcony rises above it, adjoining the southwest corner of the prayer hall. Entered through a marble portal on its northwest wall, the prayer hall is surmounted by a single dome, which measures about eight meters in diameter. The transition to the dome is achieved with four squinches over an octagonal drum pierced with four arched windows. The prayer hall has nine casement windows – two on each wall with an additional window on the southeast wall. Each casement is topped by an arched window with a different coloured glass composition, and a circular window is placed above the mihrab. The simple marble mihrab has a muqarnas hood. Muqarnas carvings were also used to highlight the springing of the squinch arches. The wooden minbar is a modern replacement.

The mausoleum is attached to the prayer hall. It is entered from the outside from northwest, but opens into the prayer hall with a grilled archway. The chamber is crowned by a mirror vault at the height of the prayer hall drum. It has three casement windows facing the Bosphorus and nine upper windows on three walls, adorned with colored glass. Decoration is limited to the stalactite carvings of the portal and painted floral and geometrical motifs on the mirror vault. Although its portal inscription was lost, inscriptive plaques over the archway in the prayer hall were preserved. The tomb, like the mosque and the complex, are made of cut stone. The L-shaped madrasa has twelve domed cells and a large classroom, all fronted by an arcade whose shed roof is carried by nineteen columns. Cells are placed all in a row except at the northern end, where a single cell encloses the arcade before the seawall. The classroom, which is seven meters squared, occupies the centre of the western wing of and projects beyond the madrasa wall. It is surmounted by a dome carried on squinches and raised on an octagonal drum. There are six windows on three of the classroom's walls, leaving the western wall for a furnace and two shelving niches. Each madrasa cell has two windows, a furnace and one or two shelving niches. The arcade was enlarged following the restoration and the madrasa was refurnished to house a Library in 1953 with the classroom use as the reading room. An additional room with privy cells is attached at the end of the southern wing.

== Gallery ==
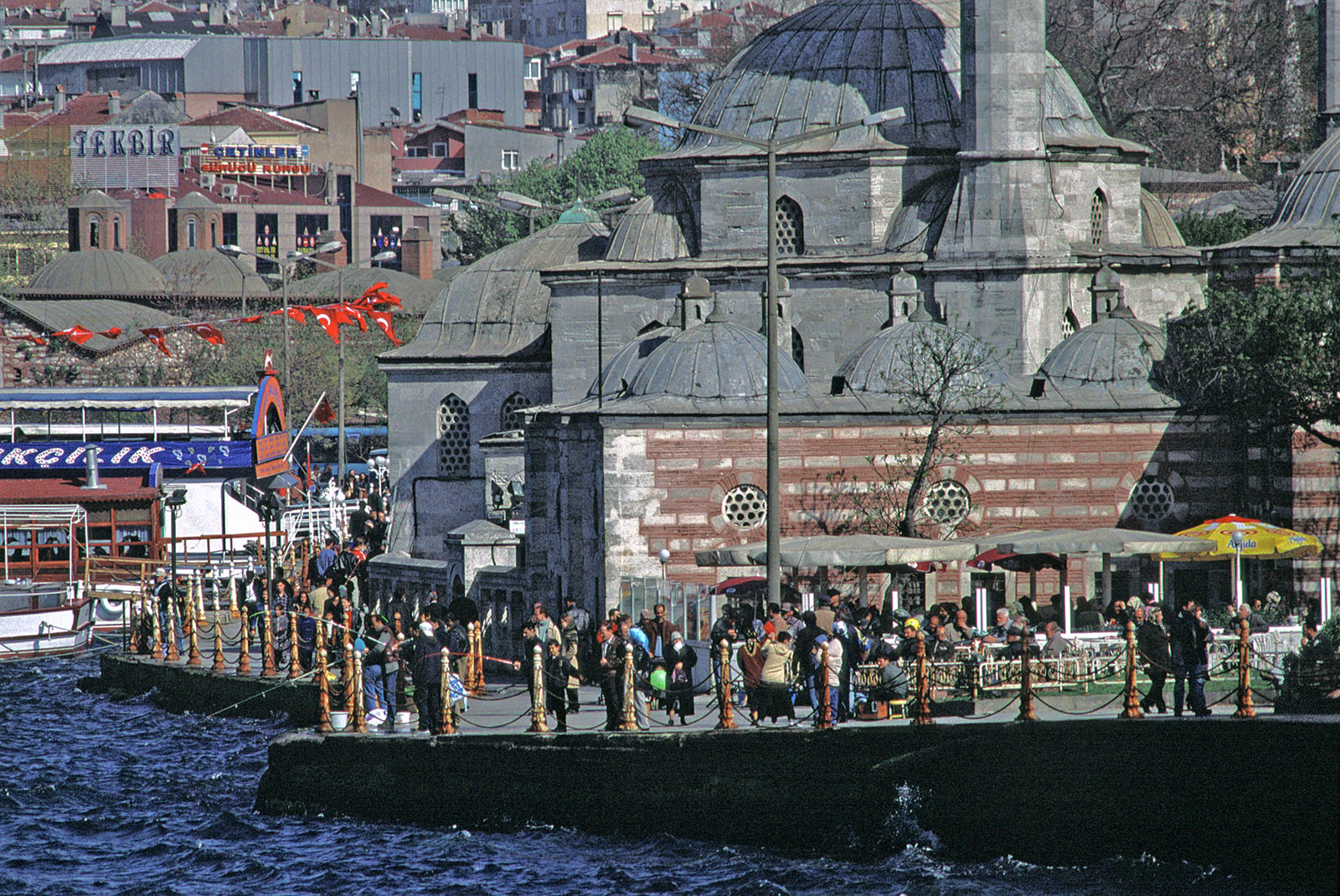
Semsi Ahmet Pasha mosque from ferry

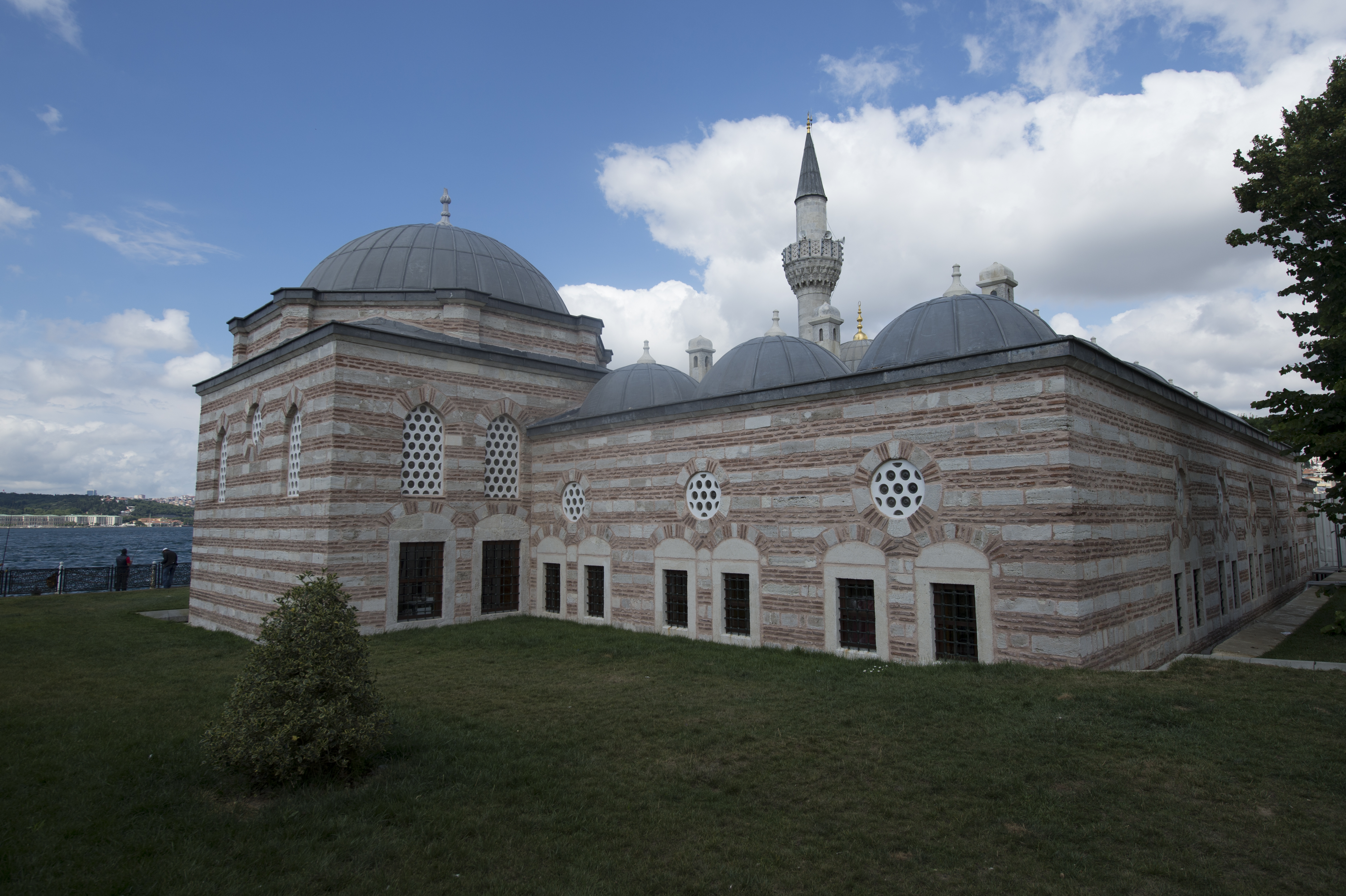
Semsi Ahmet Pasha mosque exterior of complex

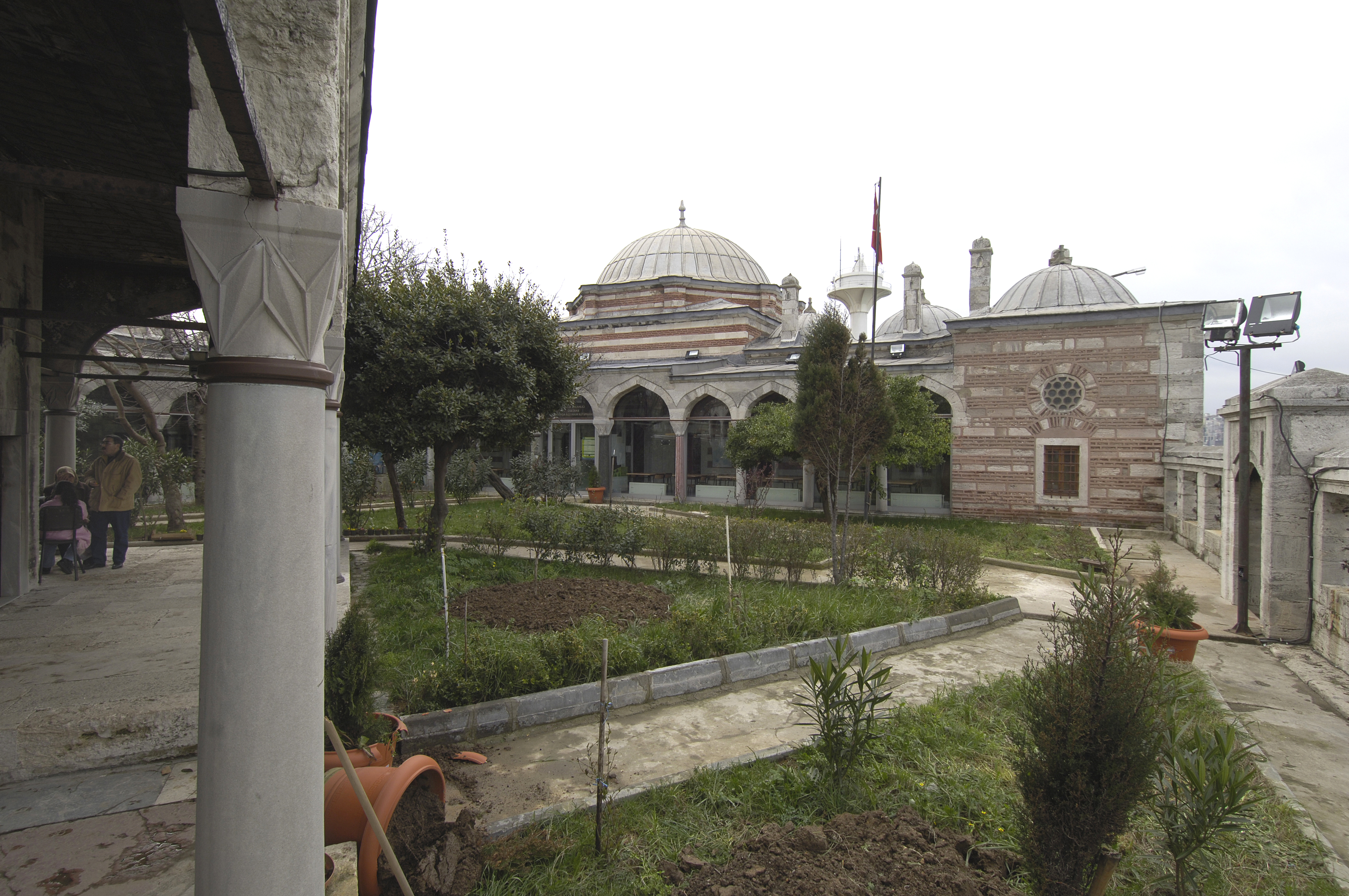
Semsi Ahmet Pasha medrese across garden from mosque front

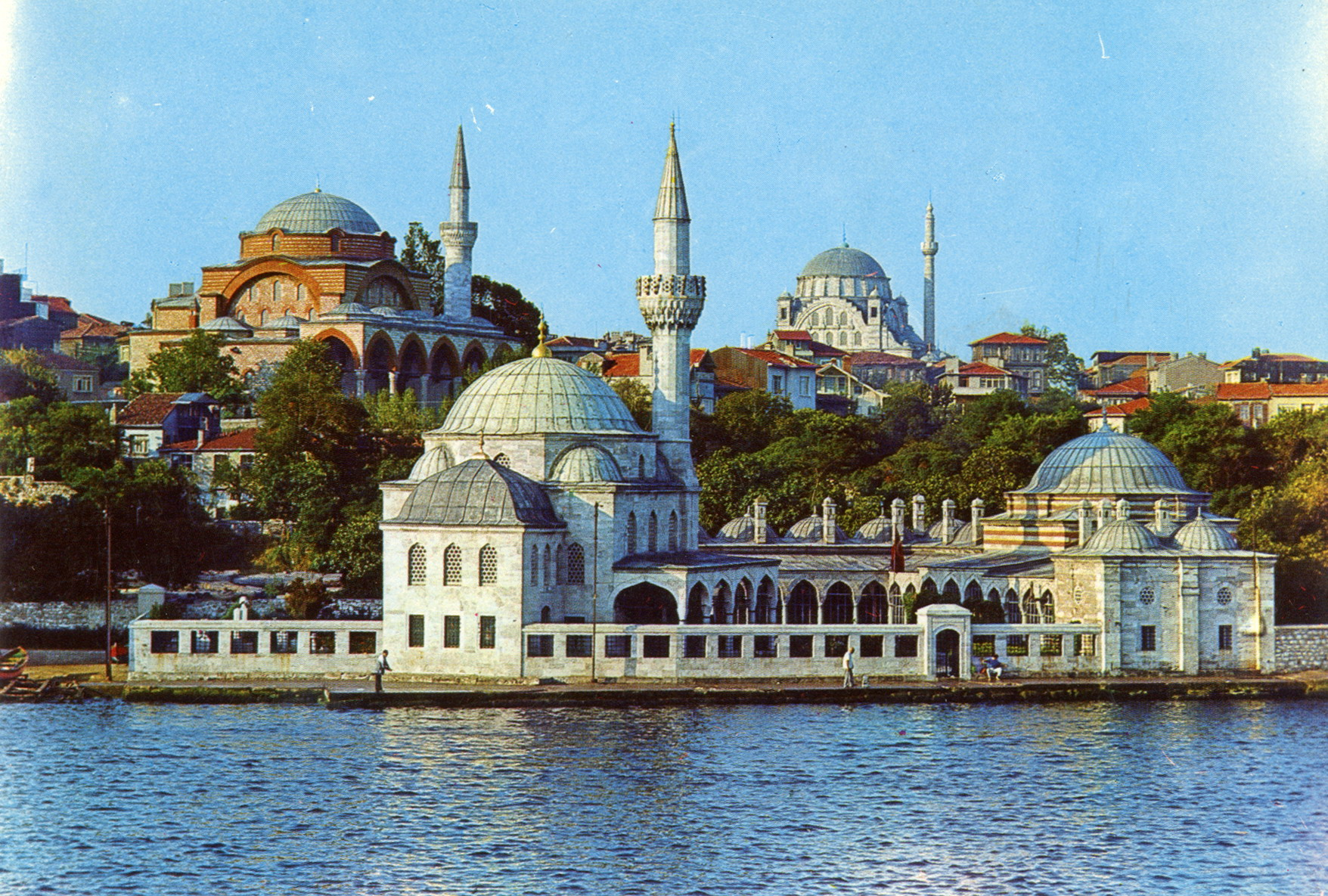
View from the Bosphorus

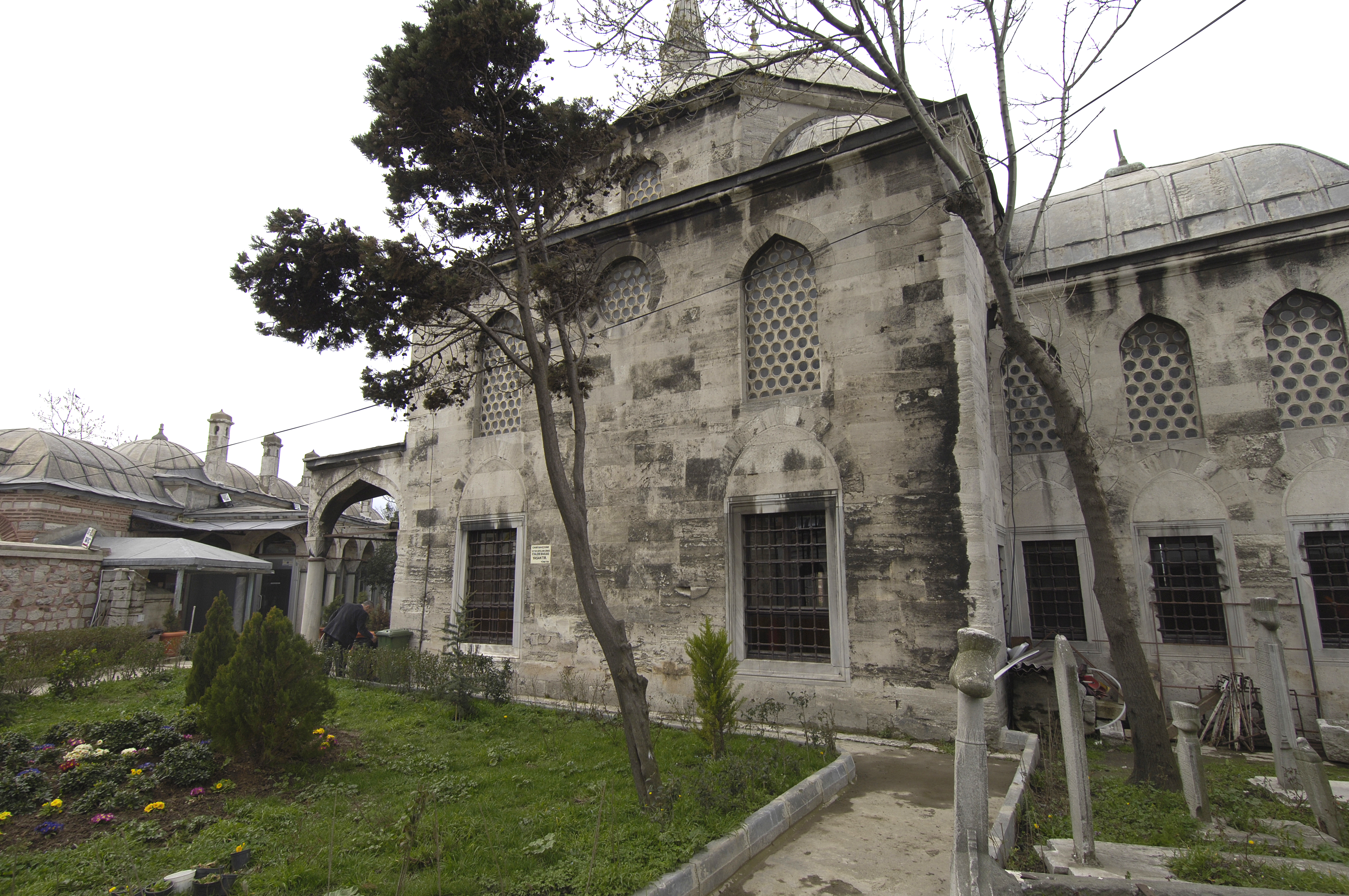
Semsi Ahmet Pasha mosque from side

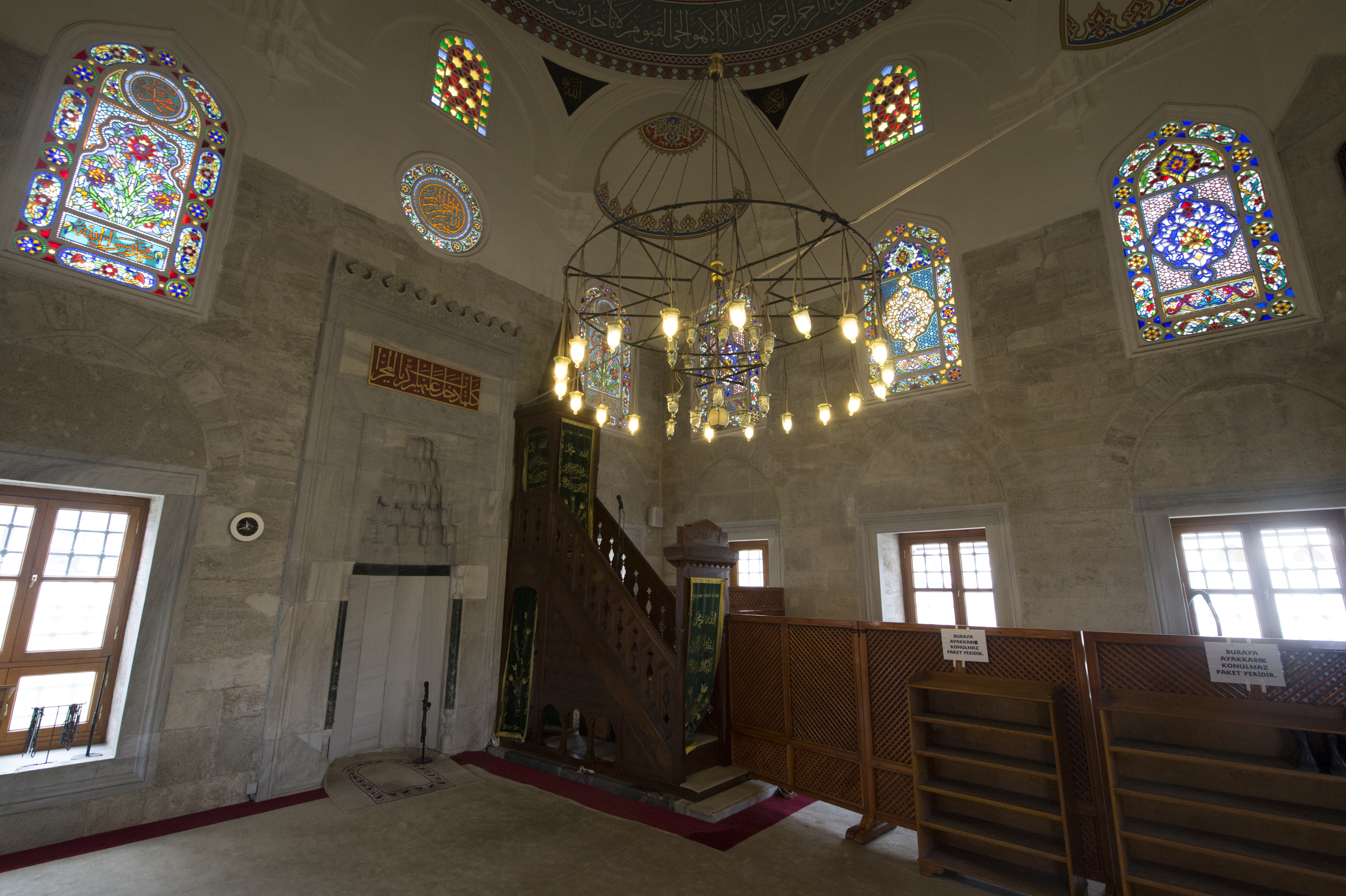
Semsi Ahmet Pasha mosque interior

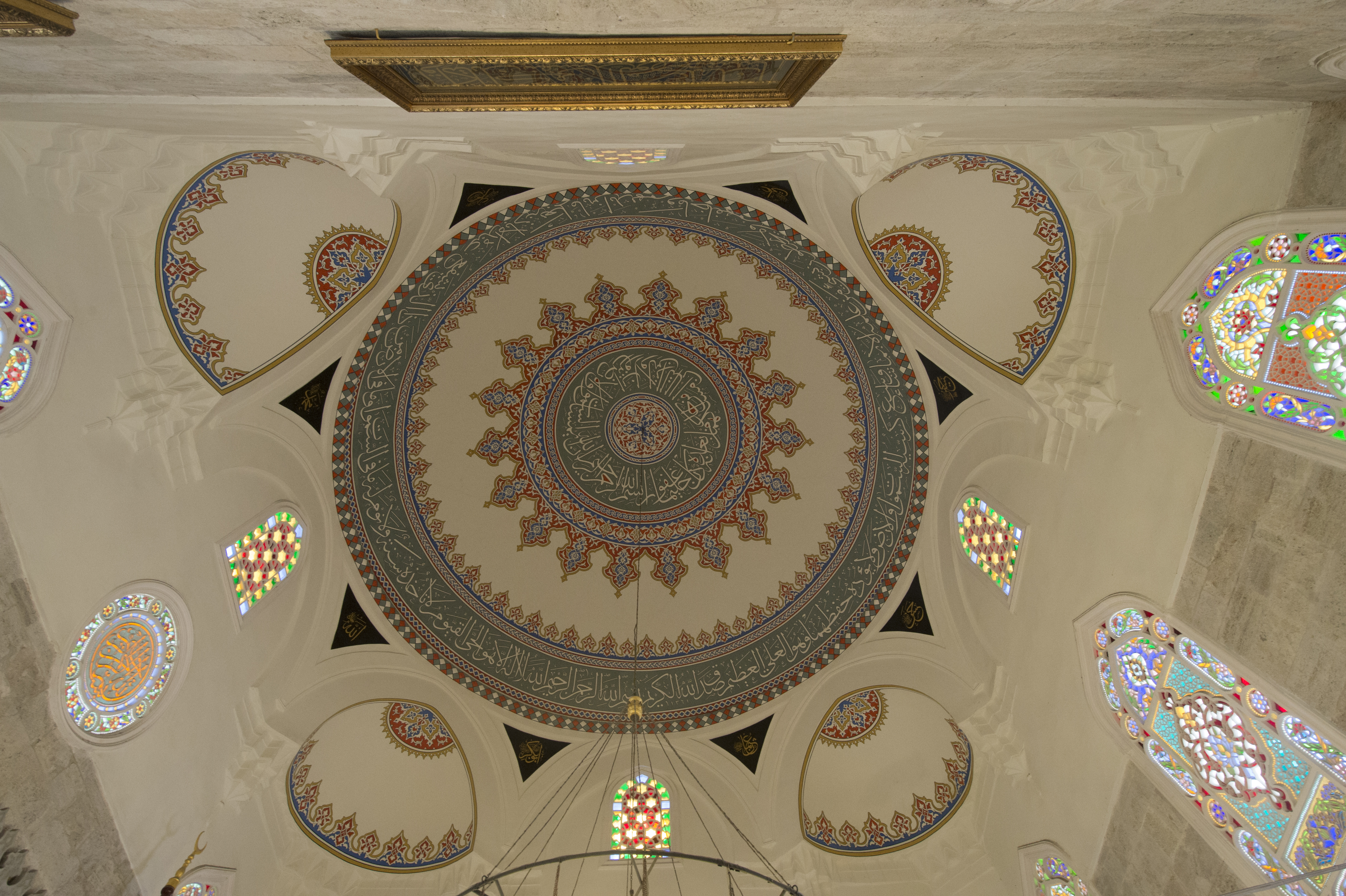
Semsi Ahmet Pasha mosque dome

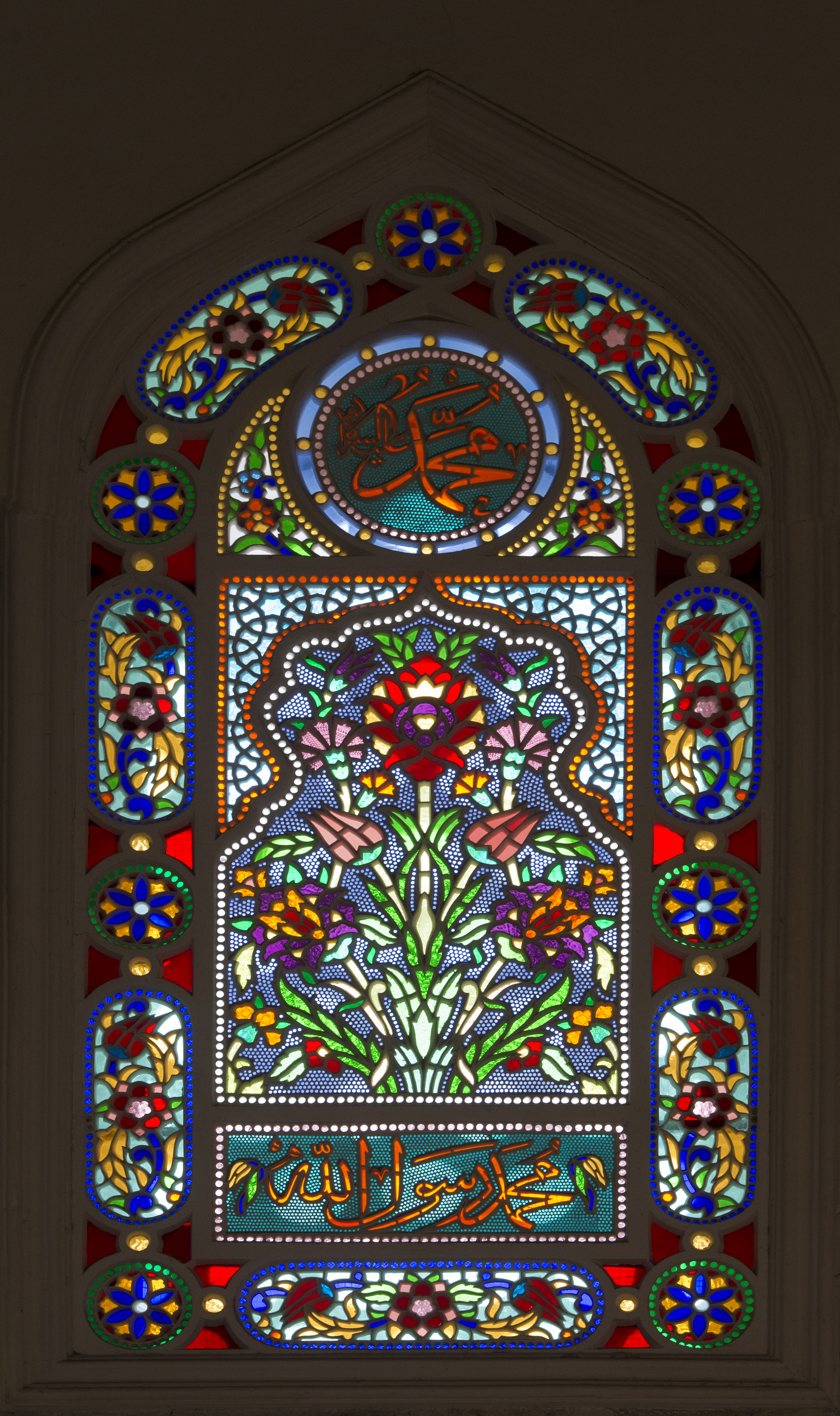
Semsi Ahmet Pasha mosque window

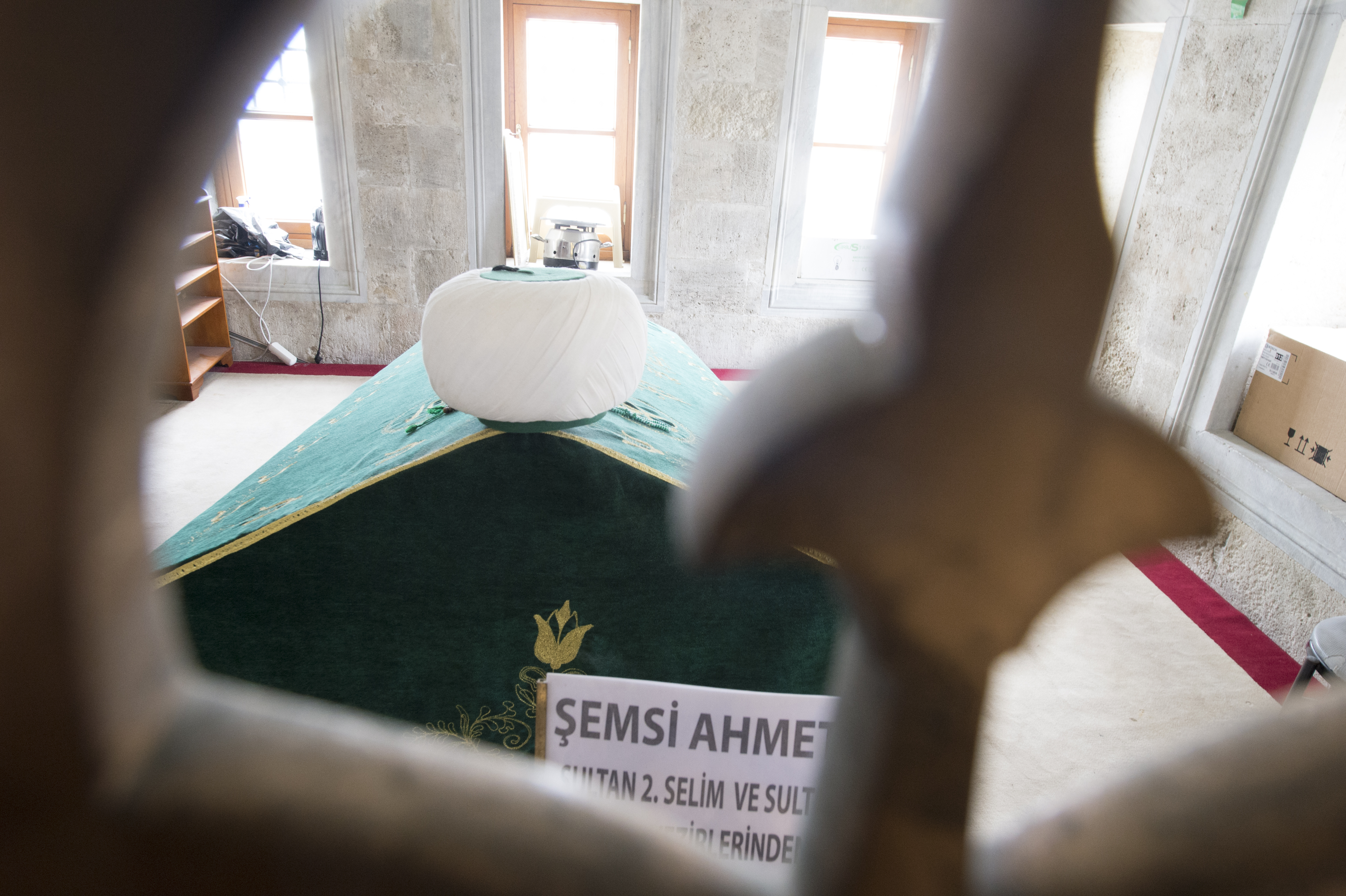
Şemsi Ahmet Paşa mosque founders grave

== See also ==
- Yeni Valide Mosque
- Rum Mehmed Pasha Mosque
- Ayazma Mosque
- List of Friday mosques designed by Mimar Sinan
