= Şemsi Efendi =

Ottoman Teacher (1851–1917)

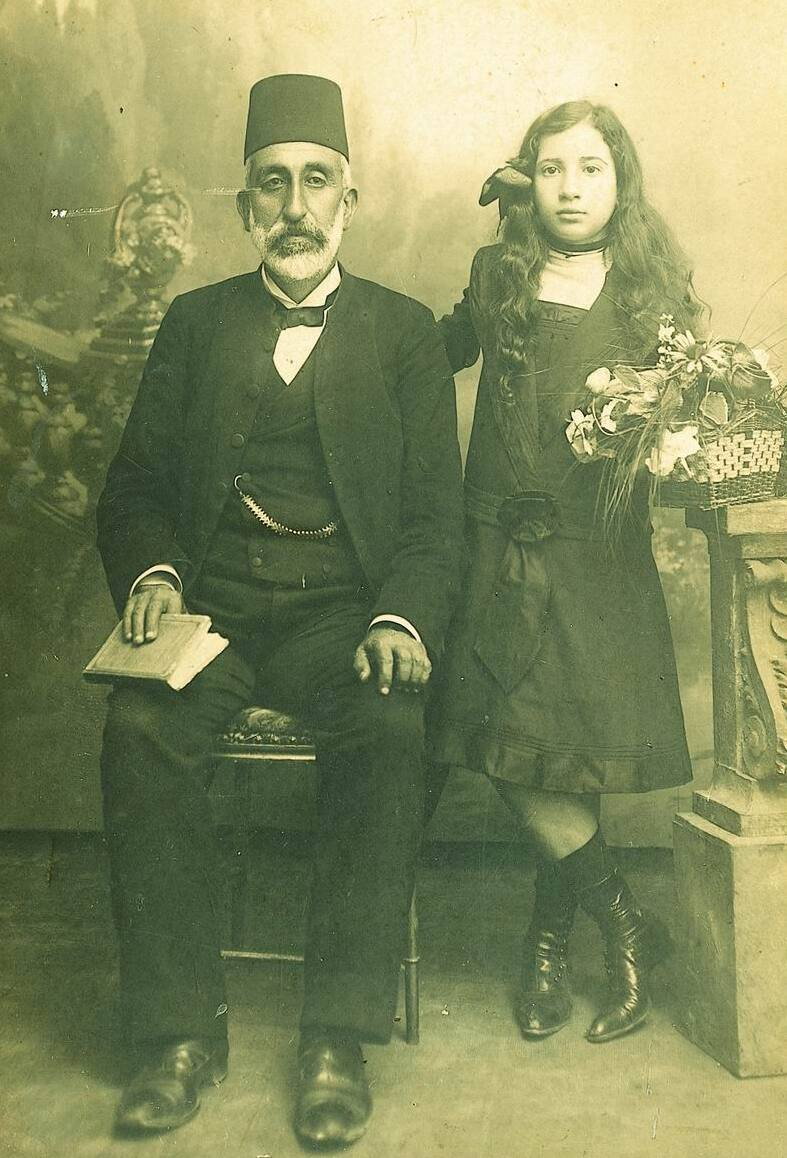
- Şemsi Efendi and the Nuriye Fuat Akev, Mother of Esin Eden, only known photo of Şemsi Efendi.
- Born: 1851/1852; Thessaloniki, Ottoman Empire
- Died: 1917; Eyüpsultan, Istanbul, Ottoman Empire
- Occupation: Teacher
- Known for: Founding the Mekteb-i Şemsi İptidai, which Atatürk's primary school

Şemsi Efendi (1851/1852–1917) was an Ottoman teacher and educator of Kapanci Donmeh descent, who gave education based on Usul-i cedid (new method) in the private school he founded in Thessaloniki in the 19th century, as well as in other private schools opened in the same period. It is thought that he taught Mustafa Kemal Atatürk how to read and write at the Mekteb-i Şemsi İptidai (Şemsi Efendi School) he founded.

The school he founded is considered the pioneer of the Terakki School and Fevziye School, which continue education in Istanbul. Şemsi Efendi received several sultanic honors as recognition for his service to education.

== Life ==
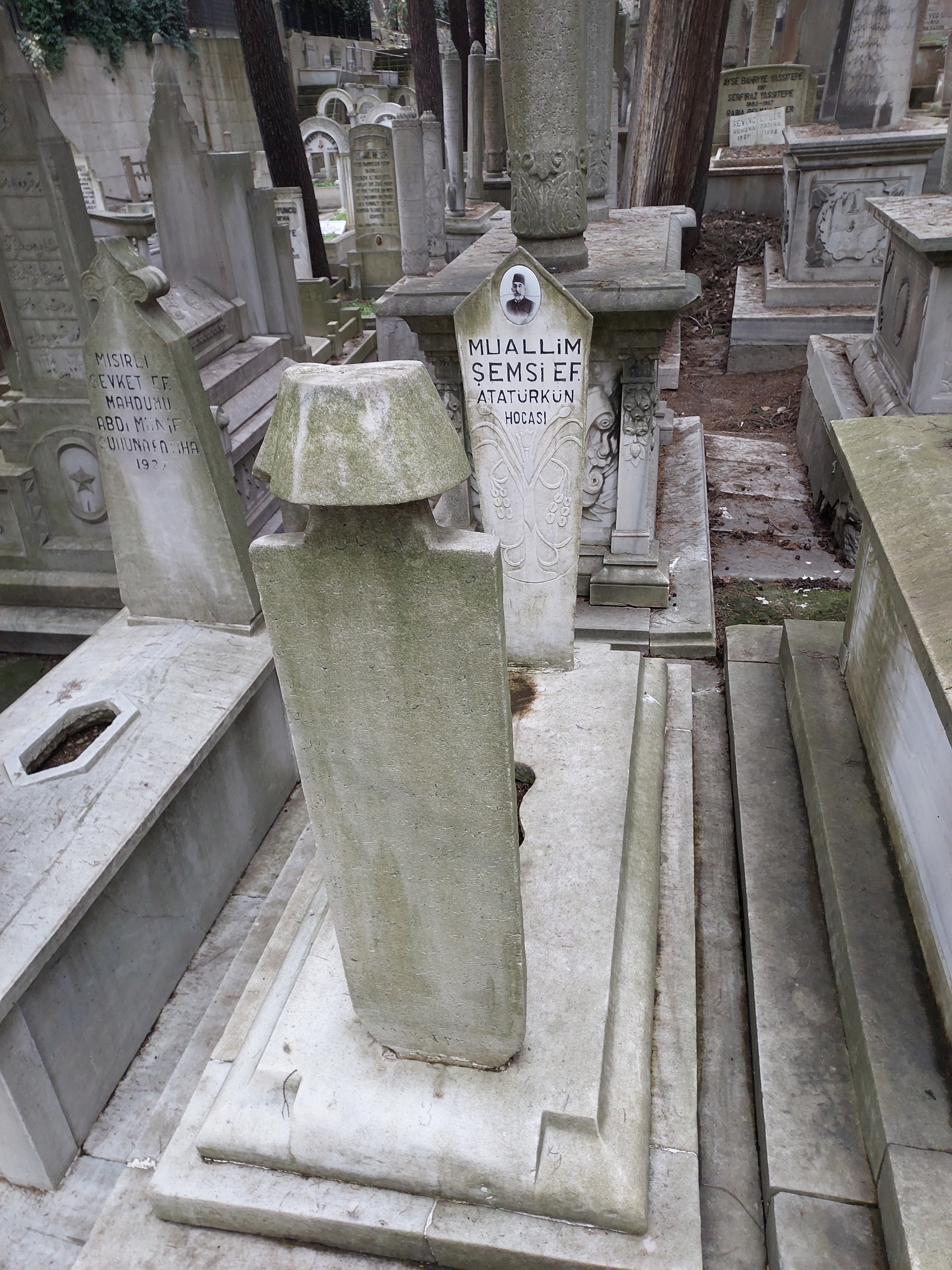
Şemsi Efendi's grave on Bülbüldere Graveyard.

He born in Thessaloniki in 1851 or 1852. His mother was Rabia Hanım, and his father was Abdi Bey. He graduated from Thessaloniki Civil Junior High School in 1867. He started working in a shop to contribute financially to his family. At the same time, he was giving private lessons to those who could not attend secondary school. After working as a clerk at the Athos customs administration between 1869 and 1871, he returned to Thessaloniki and started teaching Turkish at a newly opened foreign private school in Thessaloniki. The idea of opening a primary school to teach Turkish students under similar conditions and new methods was born.

He opened his first school in Thessaloniki in 1872, with the participation of the Thessaloniki notables and the help of philanthropists. The school he named "Şemsi Efendi School" did not last long. His school was mostly attacked by the Islamists.

The school was attacked and closed down due to its innovative methods such as using blackboards and having students play games between classes. The school was reopened after Mithat Pasha, the governor of Thessaloniki, brought the issue to the agenda in the provincial council; and expanded. For his perseverance and effort in educating students in this school, he was rewarded with the Mecidiye Medal of the fifth rank by Sultan Mehmed VI upon the suggestion of Grand Vizier Mehmed Rushdi Pash.

The Terakki School opened in Thessaloniki in 1879, and the Fevziye School, which opened in 1885, also adopted the new method of education. Şemsi Efendi served both schools.

None of the schools established by Şemsi Efendi himself lasted long, but he persistently opened new schools to replace the closed schools. One of these schools was the school he opened with İsmail Hakkı Efendi by repairing a dilapidated mosque in Aktarönü. As a result of a disagreement between them, İsmail Hakkı Efendi left and founded a new school.

He was called to Istanbul to manage the private school called Şemsti'l-ma'ârif, which was opened around 1880. However, when his negotiations did not yield a positive result, he returned to Thessaloniki.

Around 1887, he opened a new school bearing his name. Mustafa Kemal Atatürk also studied here after Hafız Mehmed Efendi School. It is claimed that Şemsi Efendi was also Atatürk's teacher. This school closed in 1891.

Şemsi Efendi was the founder of Ravza-i Ta'lîm School, but this school was also short-lived.

In the following years, he taught at Thessaloniki Fevziye School. During the reign of Abdulhamid II, he was awarded the Medjidie order of the fourth and third ranks. In the following years, he taught at Thessaloniki Fevziye School.

Upon the declaration of the Second Constitutional Era, she went to Istanbul with her female students for the celebration ceremony of the Constitutional Monarchy in 1909 and appeared before Sultan Mehmed V. During the Sultan's visit to Thessaloniki during his trip to Rumelia in 1911, he served as the spokesman of the teachers who welcomed the sultan with the title of "Şeyhü'l-mu 'allimîn". He was awarded the Order of Education of the third rank in 1910 and the second rank in 1911.

Şemsi Efendi's teaching in Thessaloniki continued until the Balkan Wars. He immigrated to Istanbul after the city was taken over by the Greeks. Teachers who immigrated from Rumelia were assigned to provincial schools on half salary, but he was appointed as primary education inspector in Istanbul. He died near Eyüpsultan in 1917. His grave is in Bülbülderesi Graveyard in Üsküdar.

== Allegations ==
Soner Yalçın, in his book named "Efendi:Beyaz Türklerin Büyük Sırrı", says about Şemsi Efendi:

[...] Schools providing modern education financed by the communities were now operating in Thessaloniki. The most famous of these was the Fevziye School, opened by Şemsi Efendi in 1873, during the reign of Governor Midhat Pasha. Şemsi Efendi, a secondary school graduate who was the child of a poor family, had opened this school with the aim of becoming a teacher and applying new teaching methods by breaking away from the memorization system applied in the neighborhood school. Şemsi Efendi was a Sabbateanist.

Various people claim that his real name is Simon Zvi or Simon Zevi. Modern Donmeh scholar Cengiz Sisman also reports his birth name as Shimon Zwi. Based on this similarity of name, they claim that he is Zvi Shimshi (Shimshelevich), the father of the 2nd President of the State of Israel, Yitzhak Ben Zvi, who died in Jerusalem in 1953. On the other hand; Şemsi Efendi, born in Thessaloniki in 1851/1852, had to migrate from Thessaloniki after the First Balkan War and came to Istanbul and died in 1917, also His grave is in Eyüpsultan. However, Ben Zvi's Polish-born father, Zvi Shimshi, is someone who carried out Zionist activities with his son in Russia for 20 years. Zvi Shimshelevitz even stored weapons in houses. In fact, due to these activities and as a result of the Tsarist police finding the weapons Shimshi had stored in 1915; Zvi Shimshi was arrested and sentenced to life imprisonment. Russian government let him do Aliyah later. Therefore, in 1923, that is, 6 years after the death of Şemsi Efendi, he went to Jerusalem and spent the rest of his life there with his sons. But Şemsi Efendi never left the Ottoman territories in his life.
