= Zhuj Selmani =

Albanian fighter

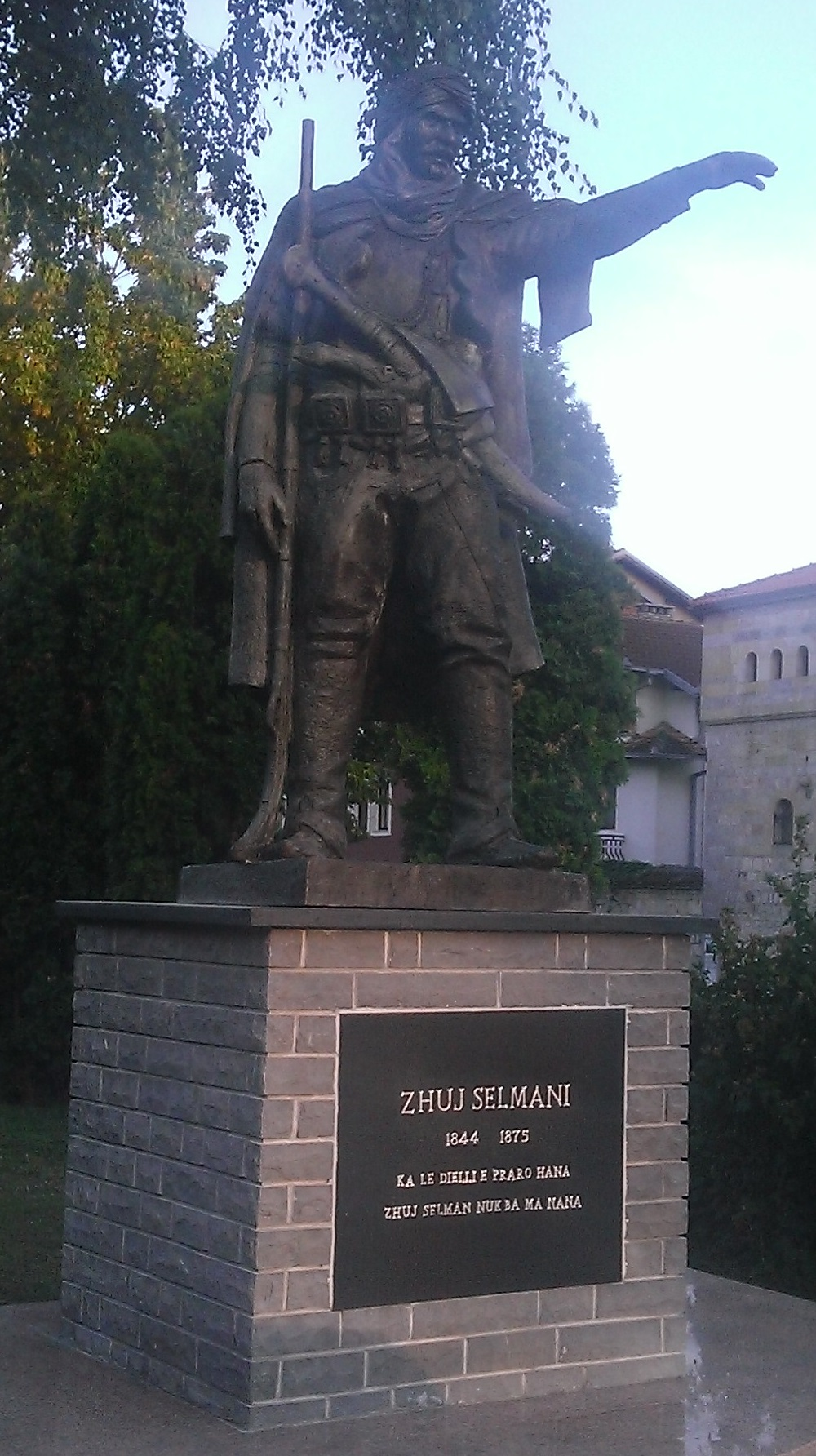
- A memorial statue of Selmani in Pejë
- Born: c. 1844; Koshutan, Rugova (region), Vilayet of Kosovo, Ottoman Empire
- Died: 1875
- Occupation: Fighter
- Years active: 1865-1875
- Known for: Refusing to surrender to the Montenegrin forces led by Mark Milani (Marko Miljanov)
- Family: Kaje Gale Selmani

Zhuj Selmani (c. 1844-1875) was an Albanian freedom fighter and an early proponent of the Albanian National Awakening. He was one of the leaders of the Albanian resistance against the Kingdom of Montenegro. At the beginning of the Great Eastern Crisis Albanians responded with armed resistance. Zhuj Selmani fought from his tower house (kulla) known as the tower of Sheremeti (Albanian: Kulla e Sheremetit). Surrounded by Montenegrin forces in his tower, he blew it up, killing himself and many of the enemy soldiers.

== Biography ==
Zhuj Selmani was born in the village of Koshutan near Pejë, in the Rugova highland in 1844, Ottoman Kosovo. He was the son of Selman Muçë Zymeraj, from the Lucëgjekaj clan of the Muriqi brotherhood, part of the wider Kelmendi tribe.

=== 1875 border clash ===
In 1875, Montenegrin forces attacked Zhuj Selmani and his friends in their tower. After many attacks and being surrounded tightly after many sieges, Selmani was severely injured. When hearing upon that the Montenegrins were planning on taking them alive to Cetinje, he fired upon the gunpowder in the tower, killing himself and many of the Montenegrin forces.

Oral sources reportedly said that Zhuj Selmani stayed in his tower for about 10 years. During this time, he often played the Lahuta, usually singing of the heroic acts of his predecessors. Selmani managed to give his friends courage to resist when the Montenegrins attacked. He was around 30 years old and not married. Recently there was a celebration of his 138th anniversary, and a statue of him was placed in one of Peja's public squares.

=== Legacy ===
Selmani appears in Albanian folklore epic songs. In Kosovo, Albanian folkloric songs refer to the exploits of Selmani, the weapons he used and the Sheremet tower.

== See also ==
- Battle of Novšiće
- Sali Jaha
