= Sali Jaha =

- Born: c. 1803; Rugova, Ottoman Empire
- Died: 1883; Plava
- Occupations: Bayraktar, tribal leader
- Years active: 1817-1880
- Known for: Defending Plava and Gucia against Montenegro

Sali Jaha (born 1803 in Rugova, died 1883) was an Albanian soldier and resistance fighter within the League of Prizren in Kosovo during the 19th century.

Jaha fought as a 14-year old and defended his country against Montenegro during the 1817 Battle of Bukovik. During the fight, he attacked two Montenegrin soldiers and cut off their heads. He brought with him the flag which the soldiers were carrying and was given the title of Bayraktar (flag bearer).

Jaha graduated from the Ottoman military as a Major (Binbashi) and continued his struggle against Montenegro. During a battle near Berane, both his sons were killed and he was forced to leave their bodies. In 1878, the League of Prizren was formed, with 110 Albanian chieftains and soldiers gathering to resist the annexation of Plav and Gusinje which the Congress of Berlin had given Montenegro. In 1879, Jaha fought under the Albanian general Ali Pasha of Gusinje. He continued to fight until his death in 1883. He is buried near his comrade Sak Faslia in Qafë Vranicë.

Jaha is recorded in the epic songs of the Albanian folklore.

== See also ==
- Battle of Novšiće
- Zhuj Selmani
