= Gëzim Tafa =

Albanian publisher

Gëzim Tafa (born in Kavajë) is an Albanian publisher and is currently the president of the "Ombra GVG" publishing house.
