= Al-Shams (newspaper) =

Al-Shams (meaning the Sun in English) is an Arabic language daily newspaper published in Libya.

== History and profile ==
Al Shams was established in 1962 by Moammar Gadhafi when he was a student. The same year it was closed down. It was relaunched in 1993 following the revolution in the country. The paper was run by the Libyan government. Abdul Hakim Maatouk served as the editor-in-chief of the paper.

In September 2011 the paper temporarily ceased publication following Gadhafi losing control of Tripoli in the 2011 Libyan civil war. The Al-Shams website only showed a blank page at the time. As of 2013 it was affiliated with the Public Press Institution.
