= Şemsi Pasha =

Ottoman nobleman and beylerbey

Şemsi Ahmed Pasha

Beylerbeylik of Rumeli

Beylerbey
- In office 1564–1569
- Sultan: Suleiman I
- Sultan: Selim II

Beylerbeylik of Anatolia

Beylerbey
- In office 1562–1564
- Sultan: Suleiman I

Beylerbeylik of Damascus

Beylerbey
- In office 1552–1555
- Sultan: Suleiman I

Personal details
- Born: Candaroğlu Sultanzade Şemsi Ahmed Paşa Bolu, Eyalet of Anatolia, Ottoman Empire
- Died: 5 March 1580 Constantinople, Ottoman Empire
- Education: Enderun School
- Issue: Fahrünnisâ Hatun; Mahmud Pasha; Mustafa Bey
- Religion: Sunni Islam

Military service
- Allegiance: Ottoman Empire
- Branch/service: Ottoman Army
- Years of service: 1552 – 1569

Sultanzade Şemsi Ahmed Pasha, known simply as Şemsi Pasha (Ottoman Turkish: شمسي أحمد پاشا; d. 5 March 1580), was an Ottoman nobleman and beylerbey who occupied several high-ranking posts, serving at various stages as the Ottoman governor-general of the beylerbeyliks of Damascus, Anatolia and Rumeli.

== Ancestry ==
Born in Bolu, in the Ottoman Eyalet of Anatolia, Şemsi Pasha was the son of Mirza Mehmed Pasha, of the princely Candaroğulları dynasty that reigned in the principality of Eflani, Kastamonu and Sinop, and a descendant of Şemseddin Yaman Candar Bey, the dynasty's eponymous founder and first bey. His paternal grandfather was Kizil Ahmed Bey, son of Ibrahim II of Candar and an unknown consort. Ibrahim subsequently married Selçuk Hatun, daughter of Mehmed I.

His mother was Şahnisa Sultan of the Ottoman dynasty, youngest daughter of Şehzade Abdullah, son of Sultan Bayezid II, making Şemsi Pasha the great-grandson of Mehmed the Conqueror.

== Life ==
Raised in the imperial residence of the period, Topkapı Palace, Şemsi Pasha attended the prestigious Ottoman Enderun School, and in the family tradition, participated in various Ottoman military campaigns, notably the Siege of Szigetvár in 1566 alongside Suleiman the Magnificent in his capacity as Beylerbey of Rumeli, in addition to the conquest of several fortresses across Europe. During the reign of Suleiman I, Şemsi Pasha served as beylerbey.

Widely renowned as a hunter of distinction, Şemsi Pasha was appointed hunting companion to Sultan Murad III.

Following his service, he charged pre-eminent Ottoman imperial architect Mimar Sinan with the task of building a mosque and adjoining complex near his main seat, the Şemsi Pasha Palace on the Bosphorus shoreline in Constaninople. The Şemsi Pasha Mosque is one of the smallest mosques of Mimar Sinan's works in the city, yet is one of the most well-known due to a combination of its miniature dimensions and waterfront location. It is mentioned as a chief example of Mimar Sinan's skill in organically blending architecture with the natural landscape.

== Issue ==
Şemsi Pasha had one daughter and two sons:

- Fahrünnisa Hatun
- Mahmud Pasha
- Mustafa Bey

== See also ==
- Şemsi Pasha Mosque
- List of Ottoman governors of Damascus

== Sources ==
- Kuran, Aptullah. 1986. Mimar Sinan. Istanbul: Hürriyet Vakfı Yayınları, p. 193–196.
- Gültekin, Gülbin. 1994. "Semsi Pasa Külliyesi." In Dünden Bugüne Istanbul Ansiklopedisi. Istanbul: Tarih Vakfi, VII, p. 158–159.
- Necipoglu, Gülru. 2005. The Age of Sinan: Architectural Culture in the Ottoman Empire. London: Reaktion Books, p. 452–498.
