= Gëzim Kasapolli =

Kosovan politician (born 1976)

Gëzim Kasapolli (born 15 March 1976, Peja, Kosovo) is a Kosovan politician and diplomat. As of 2017, he is the Ambassador of the (Republic of Kosovo) to the Republic of Croatia . Prior to his diplomatic mandate, he was Parliamentary Adviser for European Integration and Foreign Policy, Deputy Minister and Acting Minister of European Integration of the Republic of Kosovo.

== Education ==
Gëzim Kasapolli studied Economics at the University of Prishtina, and completed the MBA program in Business Management with Vienna Technical University in cooperation with the University for Business and Technology (UBT) in Pristina, where he later contributed as executive director.

== Career ==
Gëzim Kasapolli has held a number of positions with international and local organizations prior to his involvement in politics. His professional experience includes work with the International Criminal Tribunal for the former Yugoslavia (ICTY), the Organization for Security and Cooperation in Europe (OSCE), and the United Nations interim Mission in Kosovo (UNMIK) as media monitor and radio producer. He entered political life in 2005 as Political Adviser to the Prime Minister of Kosovo during a critical period when the status of Kosovo was being negotiated. Gëzim Kasapolli went on to become Deputy Minister of European Integration for a full mandate, before serving as Acting Minister of Integration, contributing to negotiations on Stabilization-Association Agreement (SSA) between Kosovo and the European Union. Subsequently, he served as Political Adviser to the Speaker of Kosovo Parliament on matters of European integration and foreign policy.
