= Selimiye =

Selimiye may refer to:

- Selimiye Mosque (disambiguation), the name of various mosques.
- Selimiye (Marmaris), a village in Muğla Province, on the Bozburun peninsula, Turkey
- Selimiye, Üsküdar, a neighbourhood in Istanbul, Turkey
  - Selimiye Barracks, located in Selimiye, Üsküdar
- Selimiye, a former name for the town Side, Antalya Province, Turkey
- Selimiye (Milas), a village in Muğla Province, near Milas, Turkey
- Selimiye Tunnel, a road tunnel between Hopa and Kemalpaşa in Artvin Province, Turkey
- Selimiye, Ceyhan, a neighbourhood in the Ceyhan district of Ankara, Turkey
