= Salimiyya =

Salimiyya may refer to:

- Salimiyya Madrasa, a 16th-century madrasa in Damascus, Syria
- Salimiyya Takiyya, a takiyya in as-Salihiyya, Damascus
- Sālimiyya, a Sufi movement in Basra
- Salmiya, a city in Hawalli Governorate in Kuwait
- Salemiyeh, a village in Gazin Rural District, Iran

== See also ==
- Selimiye (disambiguation)
