= Selimiye Mosque =

Selimiye Mosque may refer to:

- Selimiye Mosque, Edirne, Turkey
- Selimiye Mosque, Üsküdar, in Istanbul, Turkey
- Selimiye Mosque, Konya, Turkey
- Selimiye Mosque, Nicosia, Cyprus
- Selimiye Mosque, Deggendorf, Germany
- Selimie Mosque, Albania
