= Selimiye, Üsküdar =

Neighborhood in Istanbul, Turkey

Selimiye
- Neighbourhood
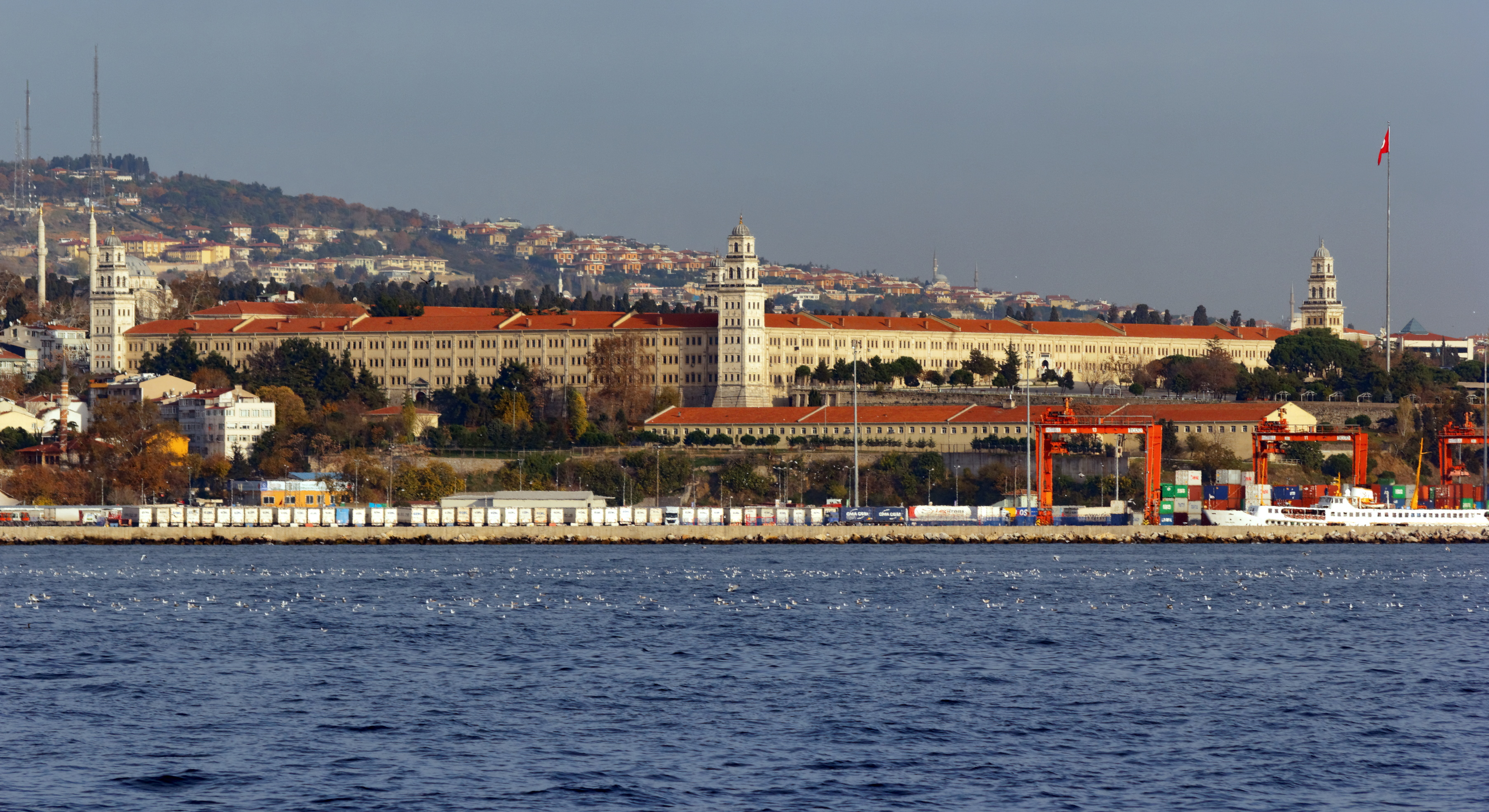

- Location within Turkey Location within Istanbul
- Coordinates: 41.0039°N 29.0198°E
- Country: Turkey
- Province: Istanbul
- District: Üsküdar
- Population (2022): 8,499
- Time zone: UTC+3 (TRT)
- Postal code: 34668
- Area code: 0216

Selimiye is neighbourhood in the municipality and district of Üsküdar, Istanbul Province, Turkey. Its population is 8,499 (2022). It is on the Asian side of the Bosphorus. It takes its name from Sultan Selim III who commissioned a barracks here that led to the creation of a new neighbourhood in its vicinity.

== History ==
The Selimiye Barracks was established in 1800 by the Ottoman Sultan Selim III for his newly reformed military forces, the Nizâm-ı Cedîd. Its establishment led to the development of the Selimiye neighbourhood as Turkey's first formally planned neighbourhood. Centrepiece is the magnificent Ottoman baroque Selimiye Mosque built in 1801 for the soldiers in the nearby barracks. Sultan Selim's barracks quickly burnt down and were recommissioned in stone by Sultan Mahmud II in 1825. The original barracks only had a single wing but during the reign of Sultan Abdülmecid the Turkish-Armenian architect Krikor Balyan added another three wings, thereby creating a central parade ground.

The Selimiye Barracks served as a hospital during the Crimean War of 1853-56 and it was here that Florence Nightingale ('the Lady with the Lamp') struggled to save lives by improving standards of hygiene. There is a small museum in her memory within the barracks even though they are still used by the Turkish army.

In 1802 the Üsküdar printing house was founded and went on to play an important role in the history of Turkish science.

Industrial facilities were soon established in this area and Selimiye became one of the most crowded neighbourhoods of Üsküdar by the middle of the 19th century.

In 2022 the old hamam that formed part of the barracks-mosque complex was restored and converted into a restaurant and library in the small Nevmekan chain.

== Historical places ==
- Selimiye Mosque
- Selimiye Barracks
