= Ayazma Mosque =

Mosque in Istanbul, Turkey

- Ayazma Camii
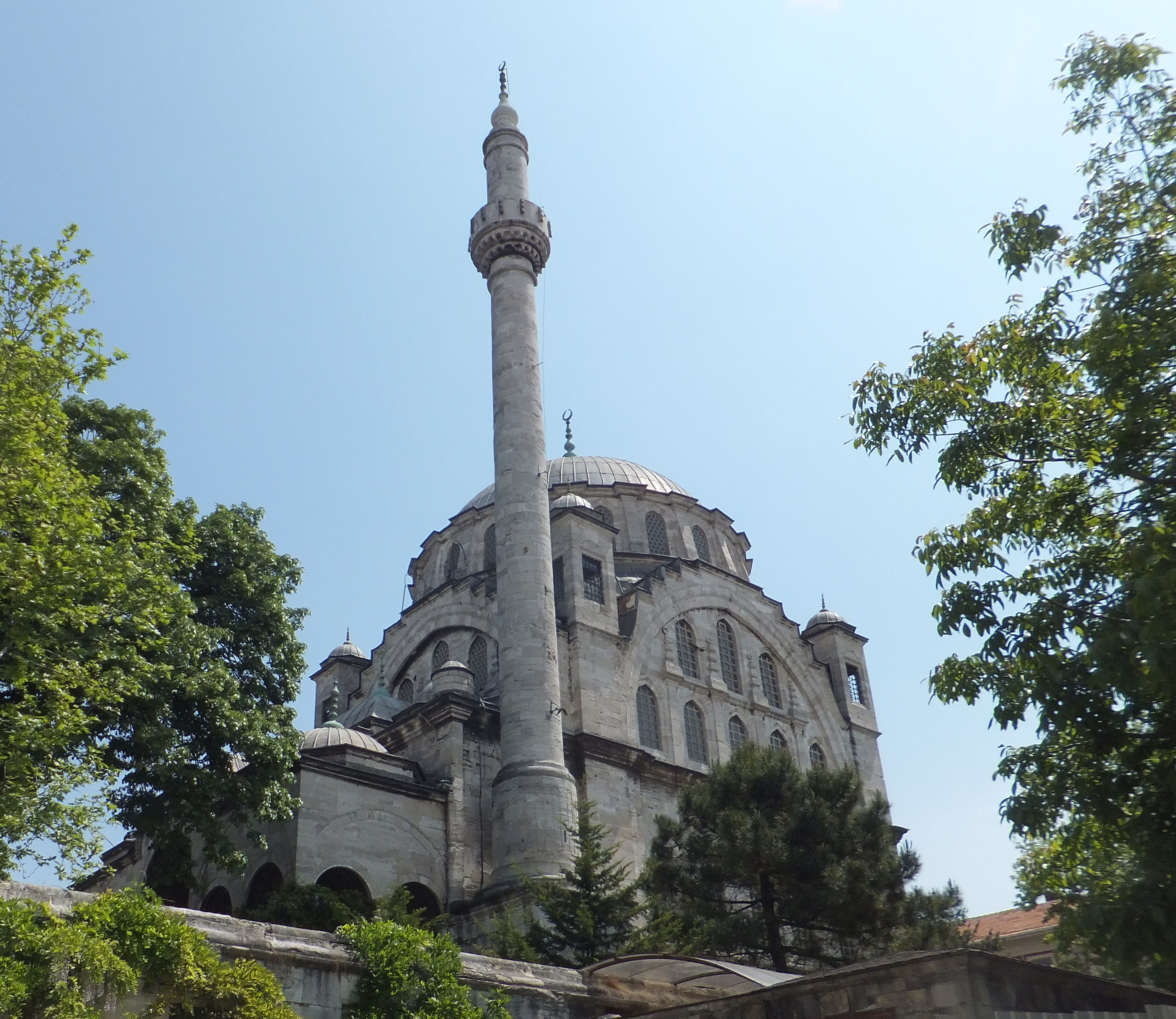

Religion
- Affiliation: Islam

Location
- Location: Üsküdar, Istanbul, Turkey
- Interactive map of Ayazma Mosque
- Coordinates: 41°01′21.5″N 29°0′31.6″E

Architecture
- Architect: Mehmed Tahir
- Type: Mosque
- Style: Ottoman Baroque
- Groundbreaking: 1757–1758
- Completed: 1760–1761

Specifications
- Minaret: 1
- Materials: cut stone

The Ayazma Mosque (Turkish: Ayazma Camii) is a mosque in the neighbourhood of Üsküdar in Istanbul, Turkey. It stands on a hillside overlooking the Bosphorus. It was commissioned by Ottoman Sultan Mustafa III and built between 1757 and 1761. It is an example of the Ottoman Baroque style that was prevalent in the 18th century.

== Historical background ==
Sultan Mustafa III (r. 1757–1774), successor of Osman II and a son of Ahmed III, engaged in many building activities during his long reign that perpetuated the Ottoman Baroque style introduced under Mahmud I. The Ayazma Mosque was his first foundation and was built in honour of his mother, Mihrişah Kadın. Construction began in 1757–1758 and finished in 1760–1761. The identity of the architect is unconfirmed, but current scholarly opinion suggests it was Mehmed Tahir, who was subsequently the chief imperial architect from 1761 to 1784. Mustafa III later went on to commission the Laleli Mosque, a larger imperial mosque complex in the Fatih district of Istanbul. In August 2022 the Ayazma Mosque reopened for prayer after a lengthy restoration.

== Architecture ==
In form, the Ayazma Mosque is essentially a smaller version of the Nuruosmaniye Mosque, signalling the importance of the Nuruosmaniye as a new model for Ottoman architects to emulate. The main structure is a single-domed prayer hall, flanked on the outside by a minaret. The mosque is richly decorated with Baroque carved stonework, especially in the mihrab and minbar. While the mosque is smaller than the Nuruosmaniye, it is relatively tall for its proportions, enhancing its sense of height. This trend towards height was pursued in later mosques such as the Nusretiye Mosque. The Ayazma Mosque differs from others mainly in the unique arrangement of its front façade, which consists of a five-arched portico reached by a wide semi-circular staircase. This arrangement is similar to a much smaller contemporary mosque built in Aydın in 1756, the Cihanoğlu Mosque.

One detail of the Ayazma Mosque that reflects a popular trend in the 18th century is the presence of several small stone birdhouses carved on the exterior. Such birdhouses had appeared in the preceding century but in the Baroque period they became more ornate and were commonly attached to the exteriors of both religious and civil buildings.

Details of the mosque

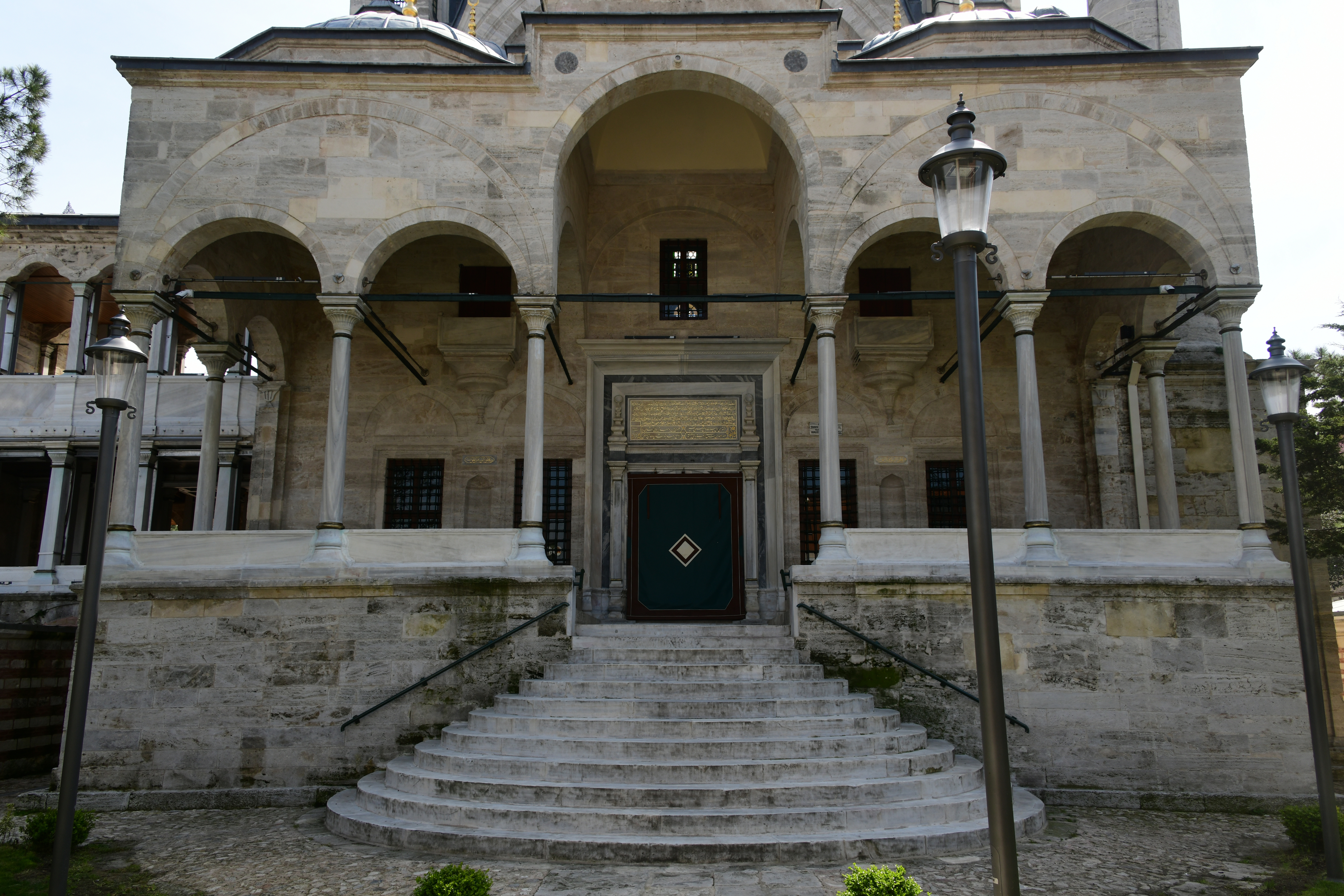
Front portico of the mosque

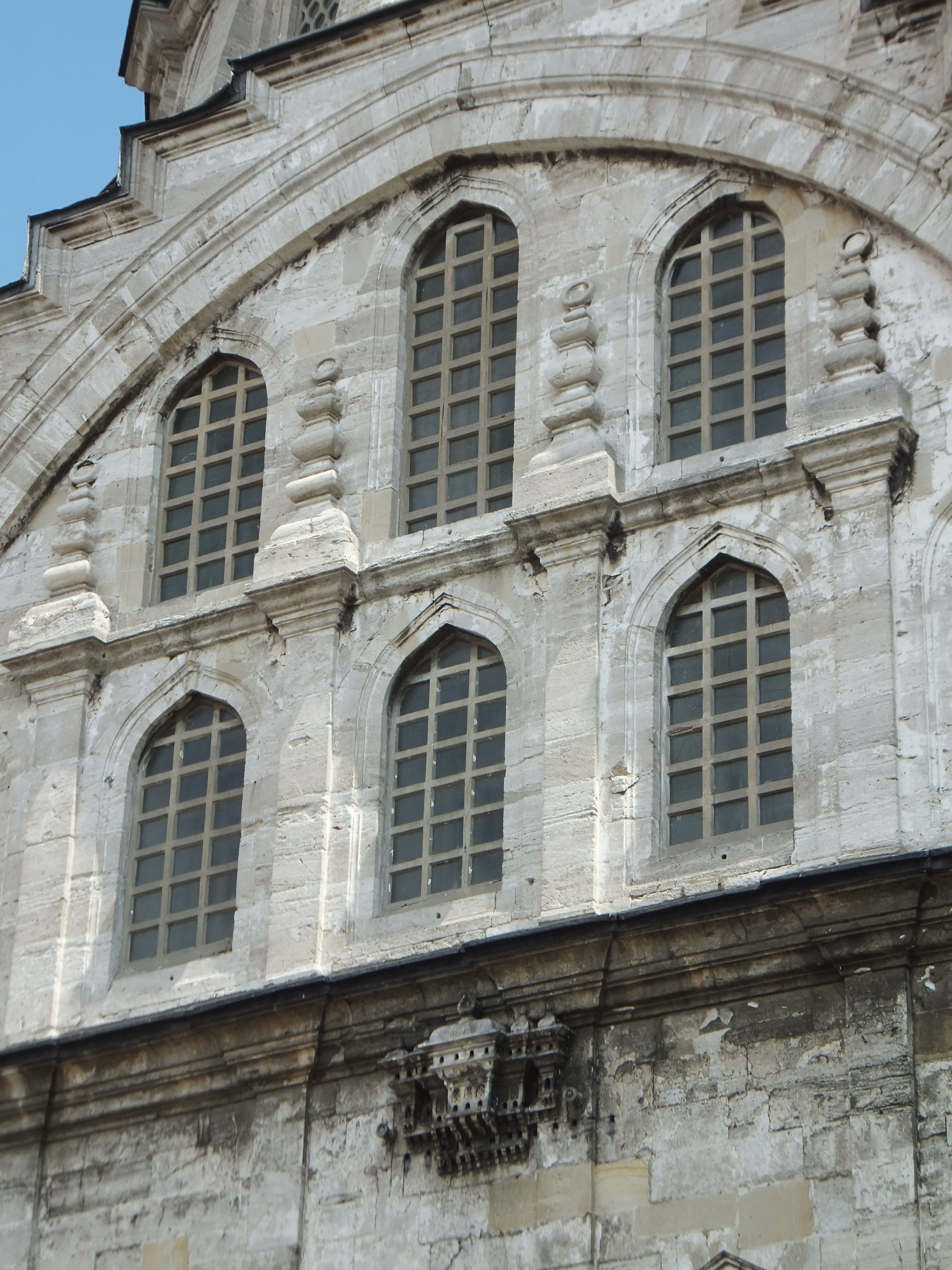
Exterior details on the side of the mosque

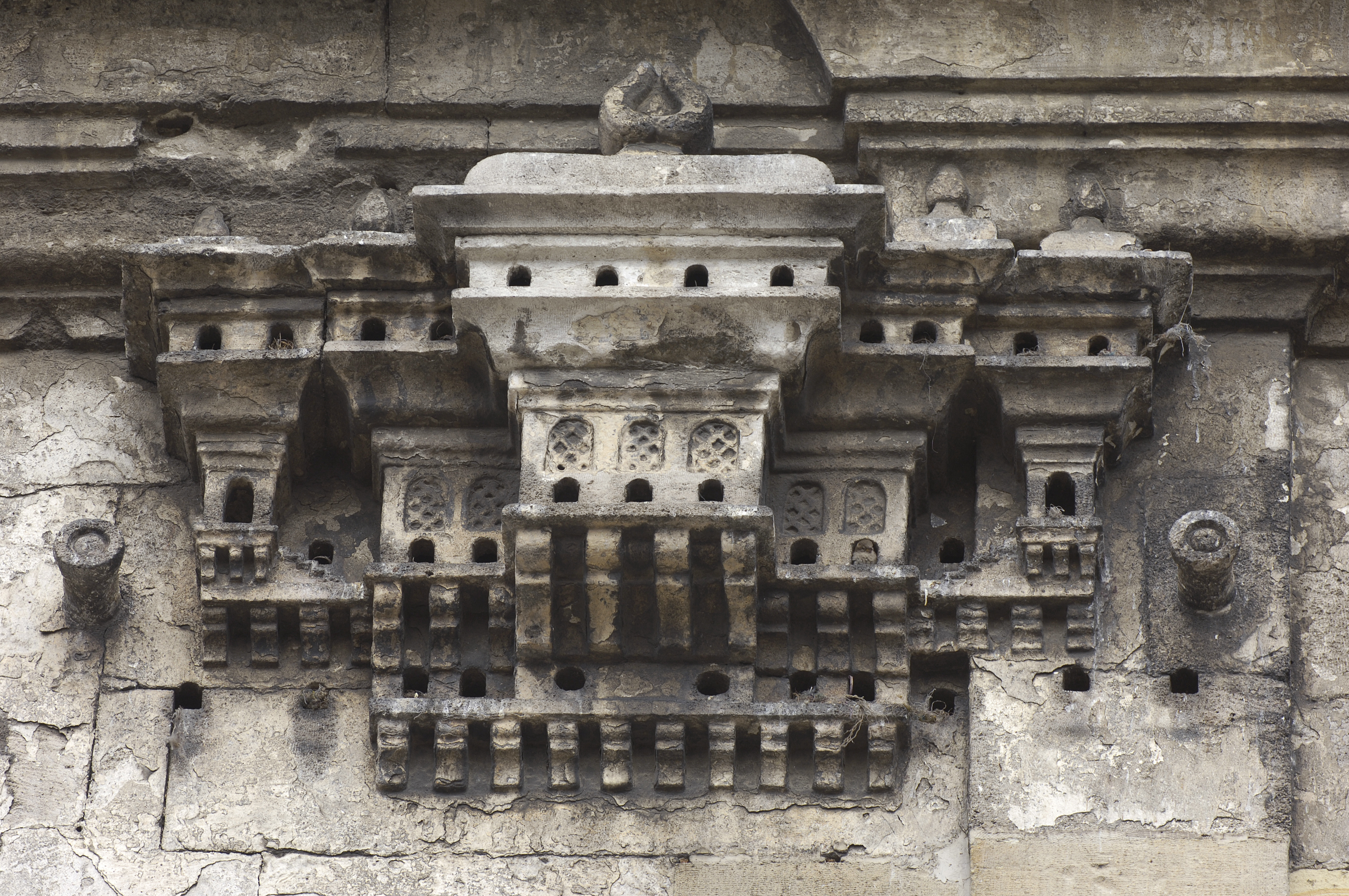
One of the stone-carved birdhouses attached to the outside of the mosque

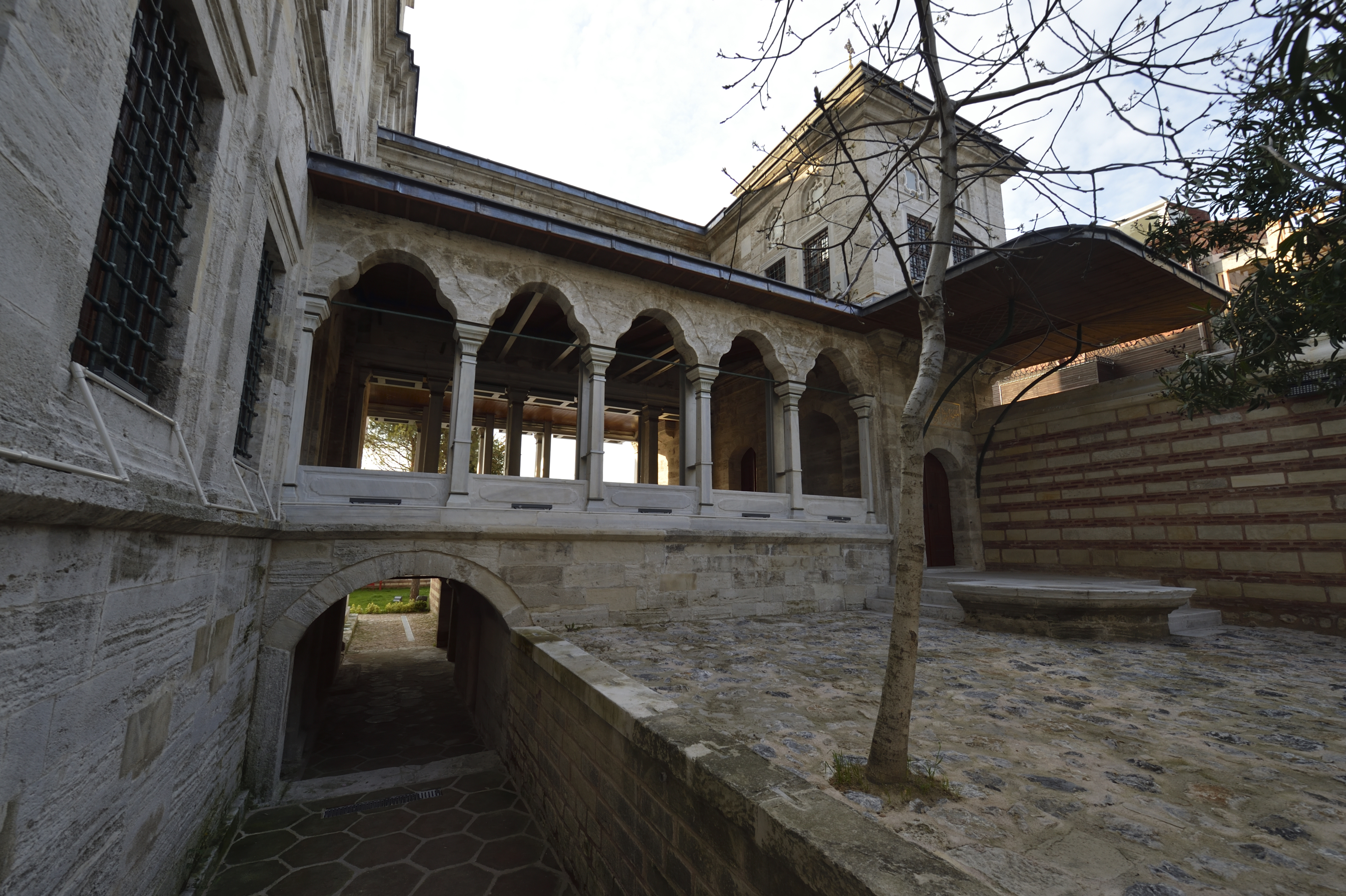
The imperial pavilion, an attached lounge and entrance reserved for the sultan

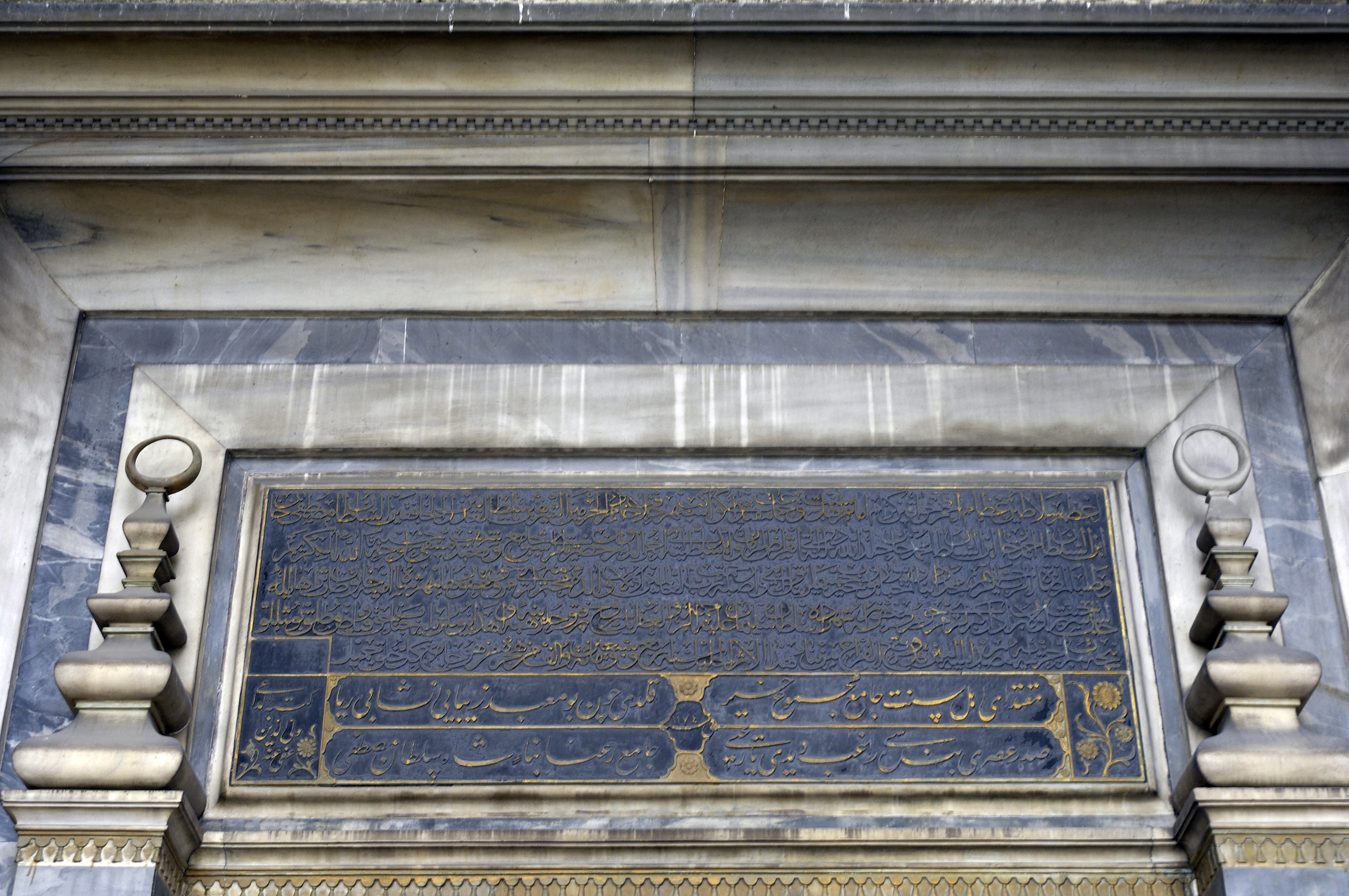
The historical plaque at the entrance to the mosque

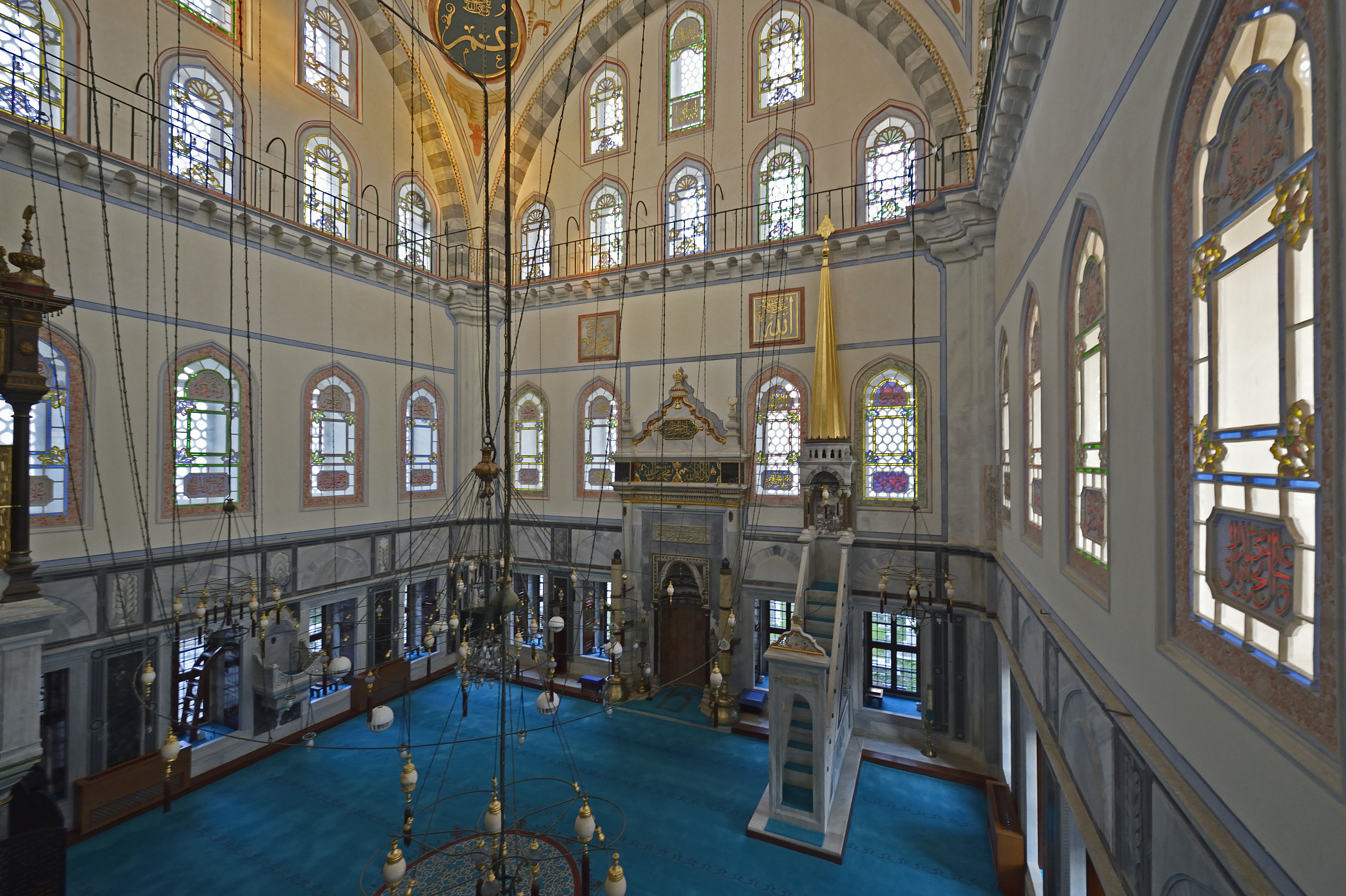
Mosque interior, looking towards the mihrab and minbar

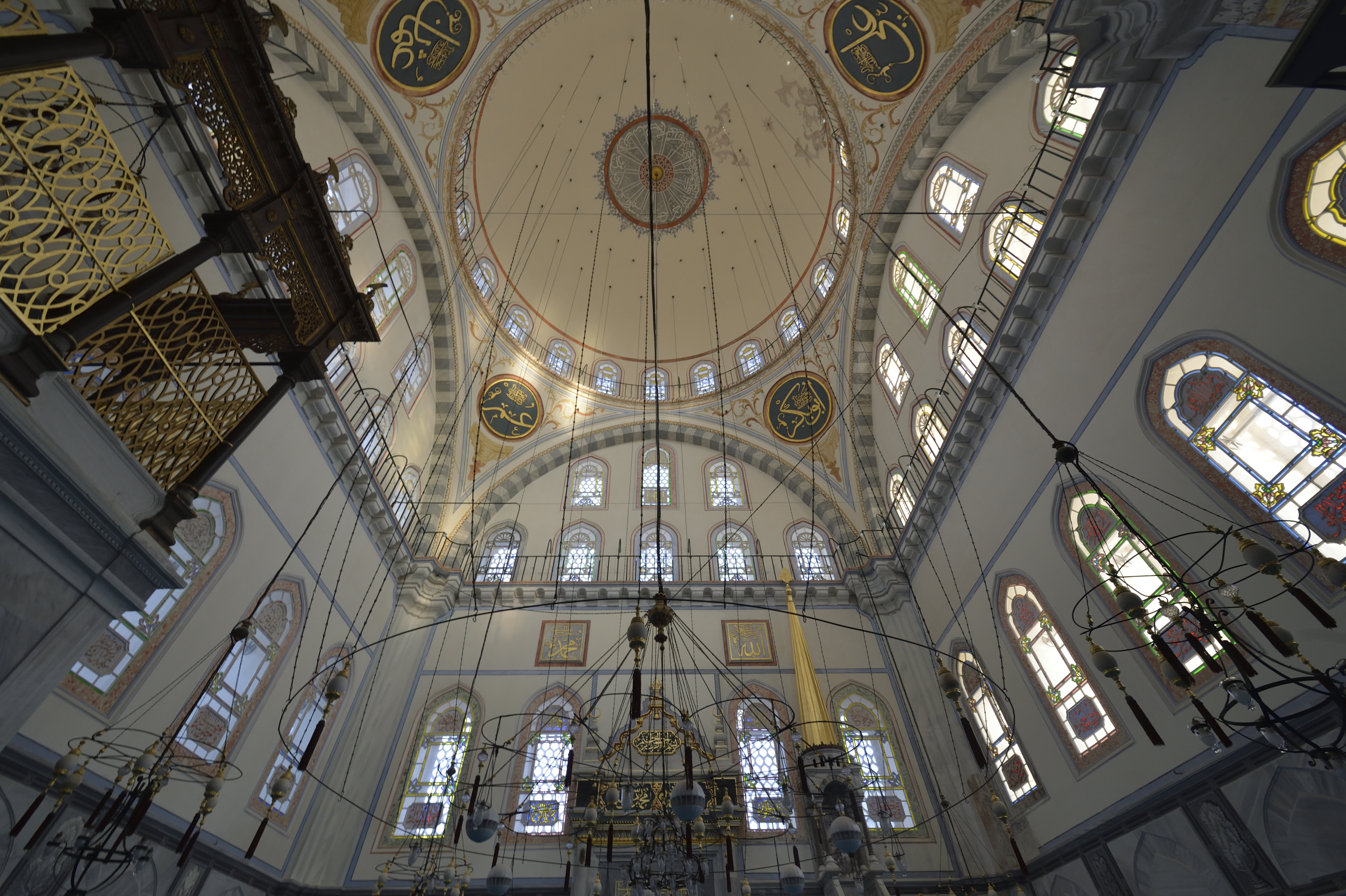
Interior view of the dome

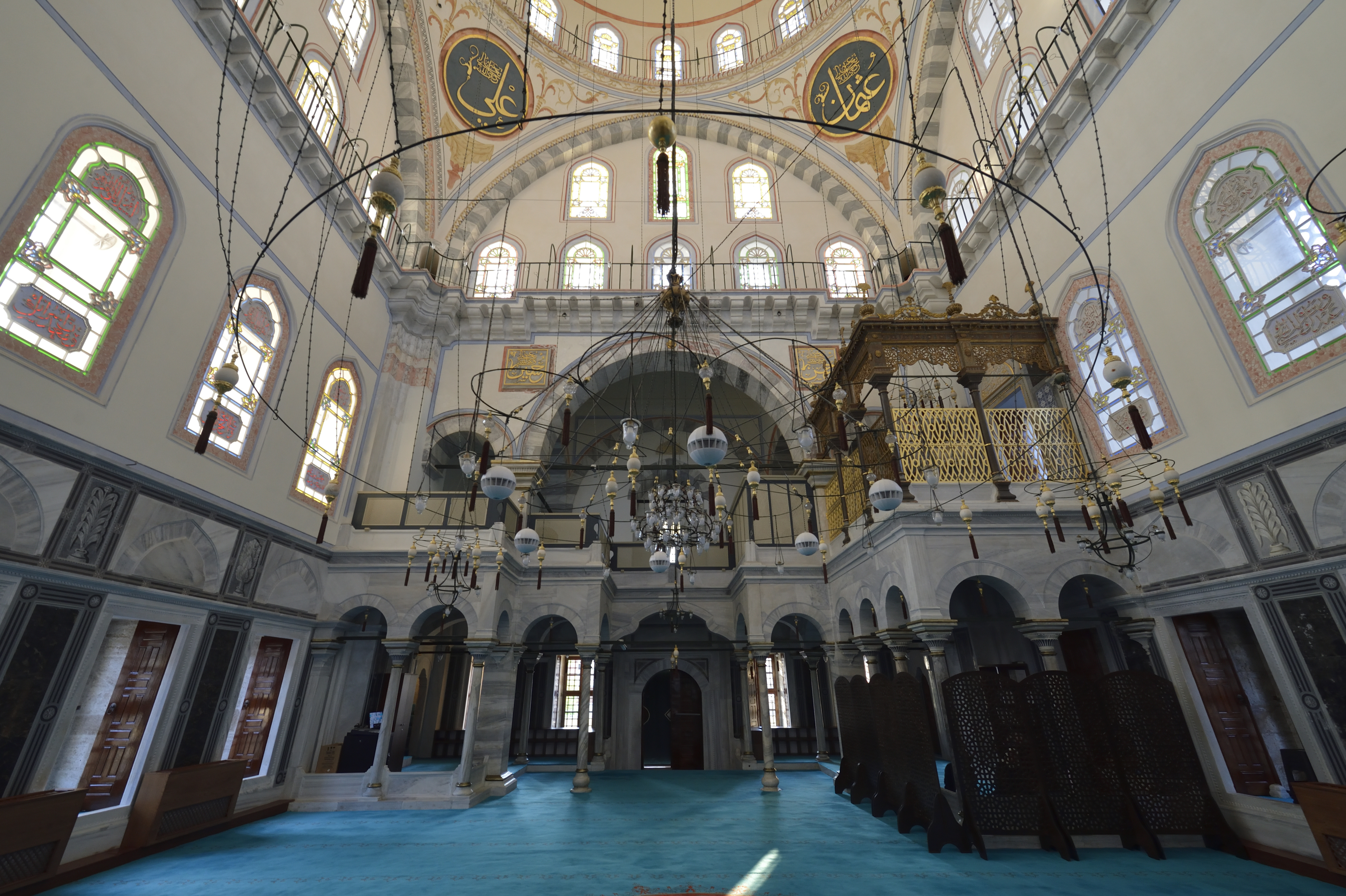
Interior, looking back towards the entrance, with the sultan's loge on the right

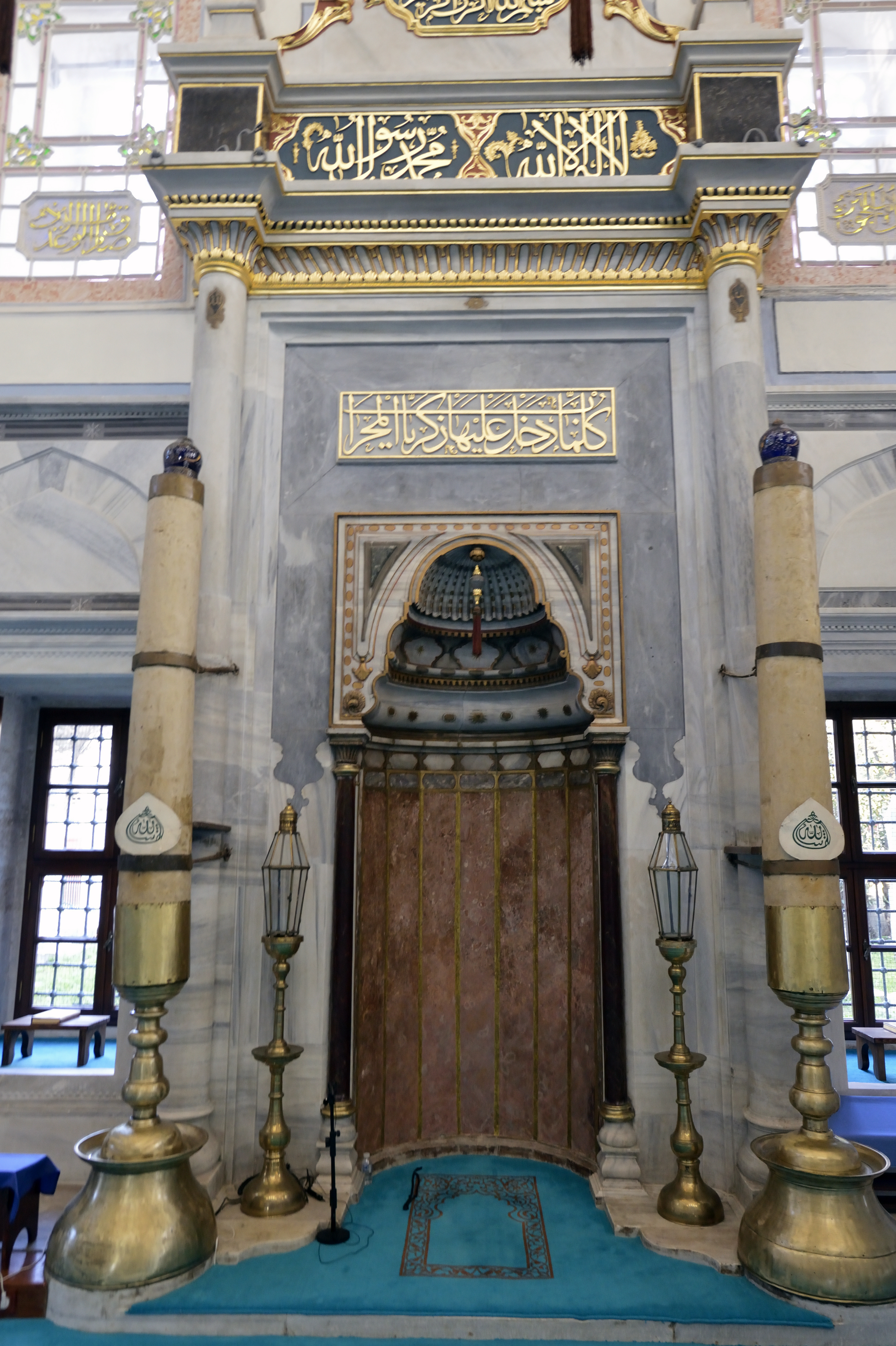
The mihrab

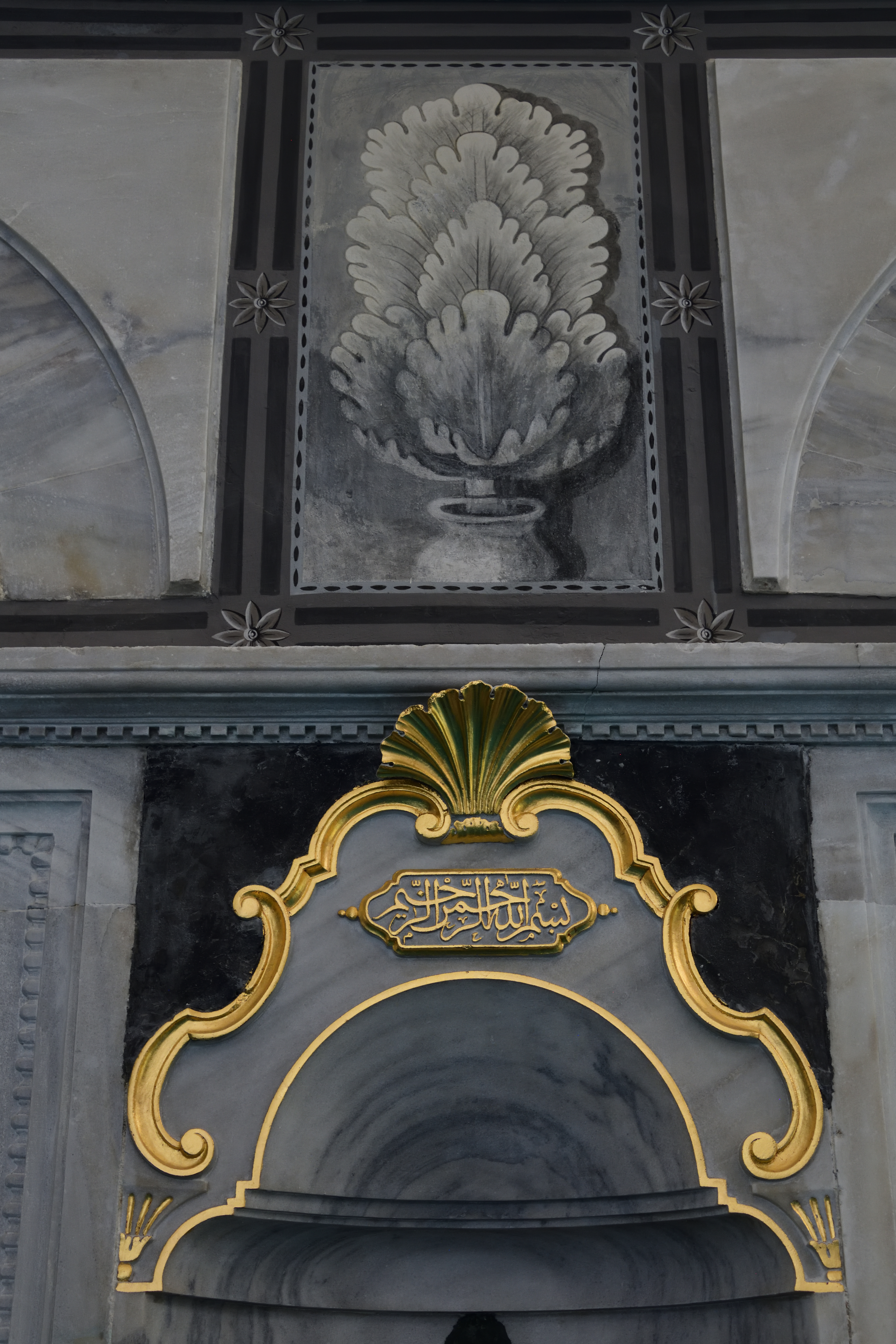
Grisaille paintwork (above) inside the mosque, likely dating from a 19th-century repainting of the decoration

== See also ==
- Şemsi Pasha Mosque
- Selimiye Mosque, Üsküdar
- List of mosques in Istanbul
