= Harem, Üsküdar =

Quarter of Istanbul, Turkey

Harem
- Quarter
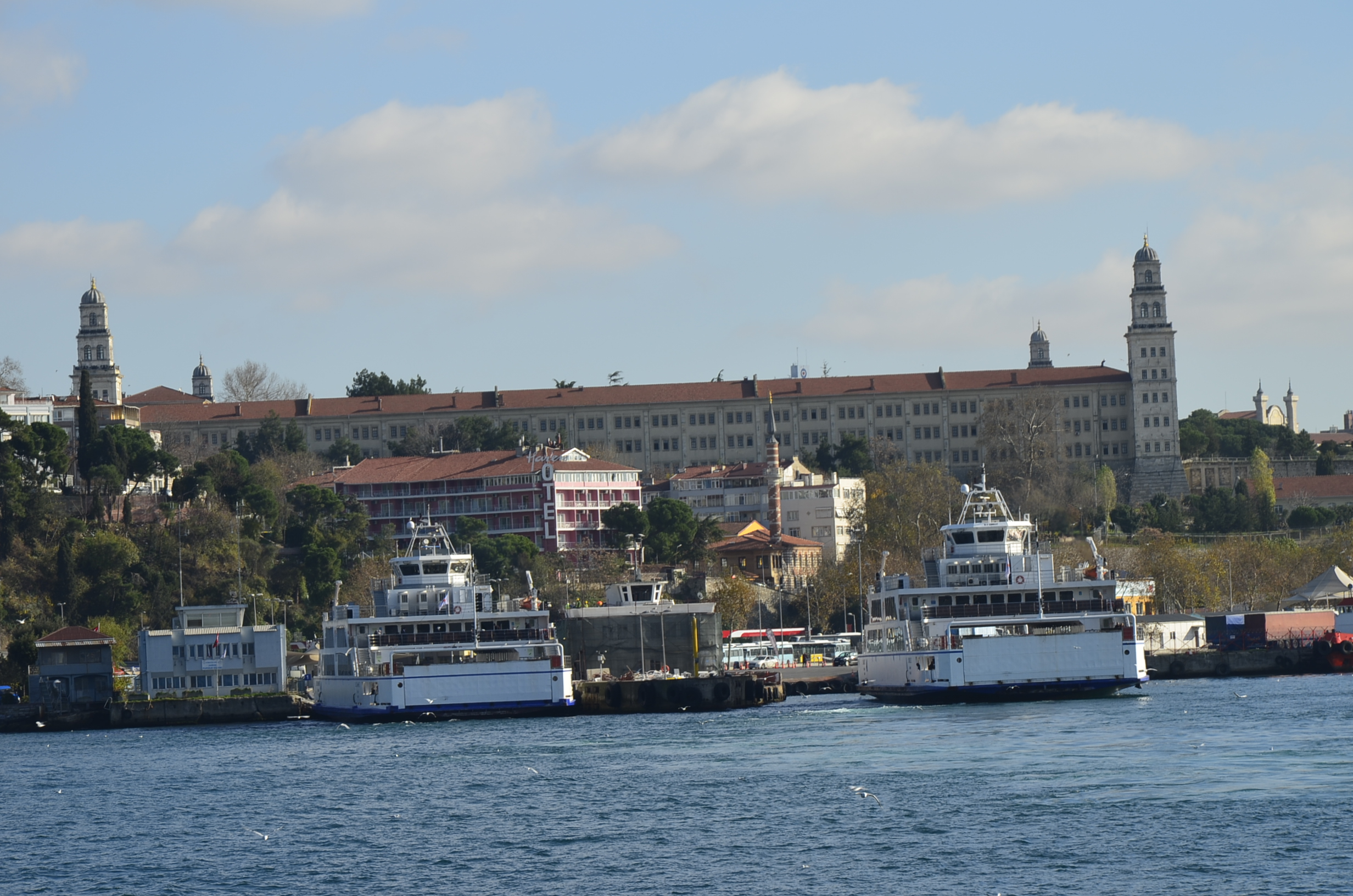
- Harem car ferryboat piers with Selimiye Barracks in the background seen from Sea of Marmara.

- Location within Istanbul
- Coordinates: 41.01069°N 29.01034°E
- Country: Turkey
- Region: Marmara
- Province: Istanbul
- District: Üsküdar
- Time zone: UTC+3 (TRT)
- Postal code: 34668
- Area code: 0216

Harem is a quarter in the Asian part of Istanbul, Turkey. Belonging to the Üsküdar district, it lies on the coast of the southern coast of the Bosphorus, near the entrance of the Sea of Marmara between the centres of Üsküdar and Kadıköy districts, next to Haydarpaşa Terminal.

One of the two main coach terminals in Istanbul is located in Harem (Turkish: Harem Otogarı). Coaches to almost all of the cities in Turkey depart from here. In October 2013, the Metropolitan Municipality announced that there exist plans to relocate Harem coach terminal because of capacity problems and inner city traffic congestion. There is a car ferryboat terminal in Harem operated by İDO for a line to Sirkeci, which is directly across the strait. The car ferryboat line offers an alternative to the heavy traffic on the Bosphorus Bridge.

Selimiye Barracks, best known as the place, where famous nurse Florence Nightingale cared for the wounded and infected British soldiers during the Crimean War, is situated on the highway connecting the terminals to the motorway Istanbul-Ankara (O.2).
