= Selimiye Mosque, Üsküdar =

Mosque in Üsküdar, Istanbul, Turkey

Selimiye Mosque Büyük Selimiye Camii
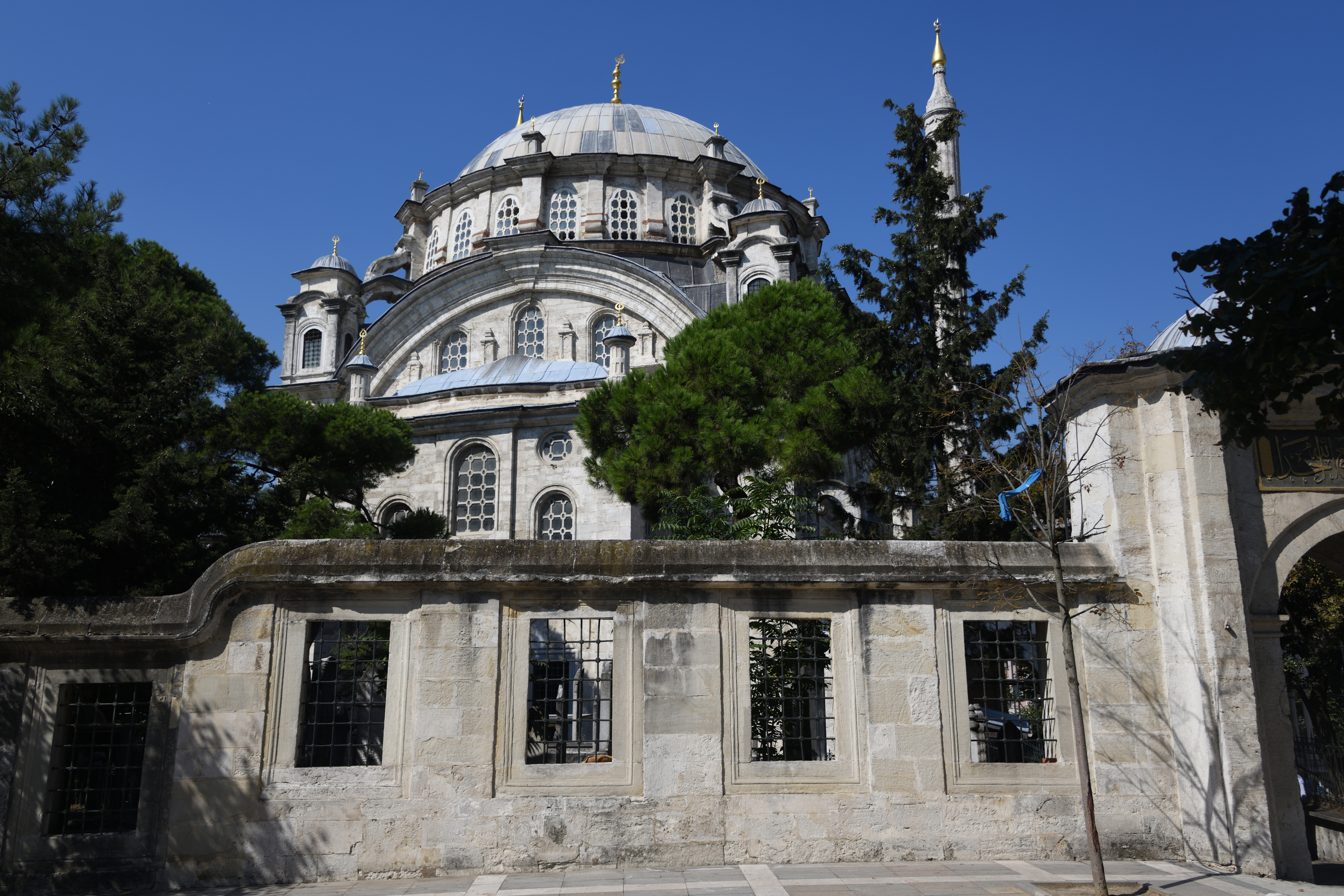

- Location within Istanbul

Religion
- Affiliation: Islam

Location
- Location: Üsküdar, Istanbul, Turkey
- Coordinates: 41.00966°N 29.01655°E

Architecture
- Type: Mosque
- Style: Ottoman Baroque
- Groundbreaking: 1801
- Completed: 1805

Specifications
- Minaret: 2
- Materials: cut stone, marble

The Selimiye Mosque (Turkish: (Büyük) Selimiye Camii, lit. '(Grand) Mosque of Selim') is a mosque in the district of Üsküdar in Istanbul, Turkey, near the Selimiye Barracks. It was commissioned by Ottoman Sultan Selim III (reigned 1789–1807) and built between 1801 and 1805.

== Background ==
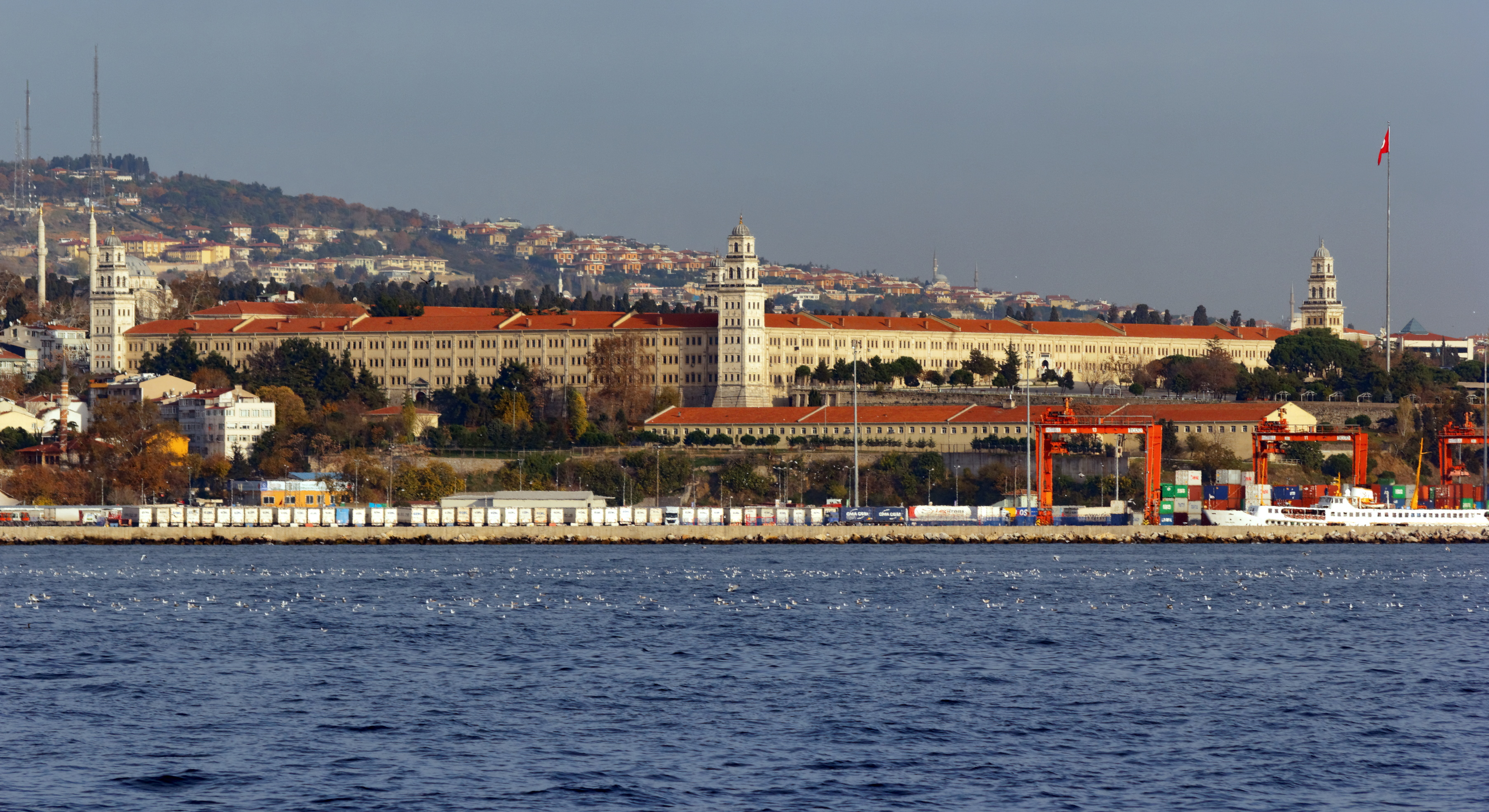
View of the Selimiye Barracks from the Bosphorus

The Selimiye mosque complex was built by Selim III between 1801 and 1805. It is located next to the Selimiye Barracks, the largest Ottoman barracks built in this period, which was constructed between 1800 and 1803. This building was burned down by rebel Janissaries in 1812 but was rebuilt in stone by Mahmud II between 1825 and 1828 and further expanded into its current form by Abdülmecid I between 1842 and 1853. The barracks was a new building type in Ottoman architecture which arose in conjunction with Selim III's reform attempts, the Nizam-I Cedid ('New Order'), which among other things created a new Western-style army. Selim's construction of both the barracks and the mosque complex was likely part of a larger plan and was likely meant, in part, to symbolise the New Order.

Three men served as chief court architects during the mosque's construction but it is thought that the main architect may have been Foti Kalfa, a Christian master carpenter. The mosque was part of a külliye (charitable complex) that also included a mektep (primary school), a muvakkithane (timekeeper's house), a fountain and a hamam (bathhouse). More innovative was the inclusion an array of factories, shops, and modern facilities such as a printing house arranged to form the nucleus of a new neighbourhood with a regular grid of streets. Today, however, only the mosque has been generally preserved in its original form. The minarets of the mosque were rebuilt in 1822. During the WWI, the area around the mosque was bombed by the British forces.

== Architecture ==
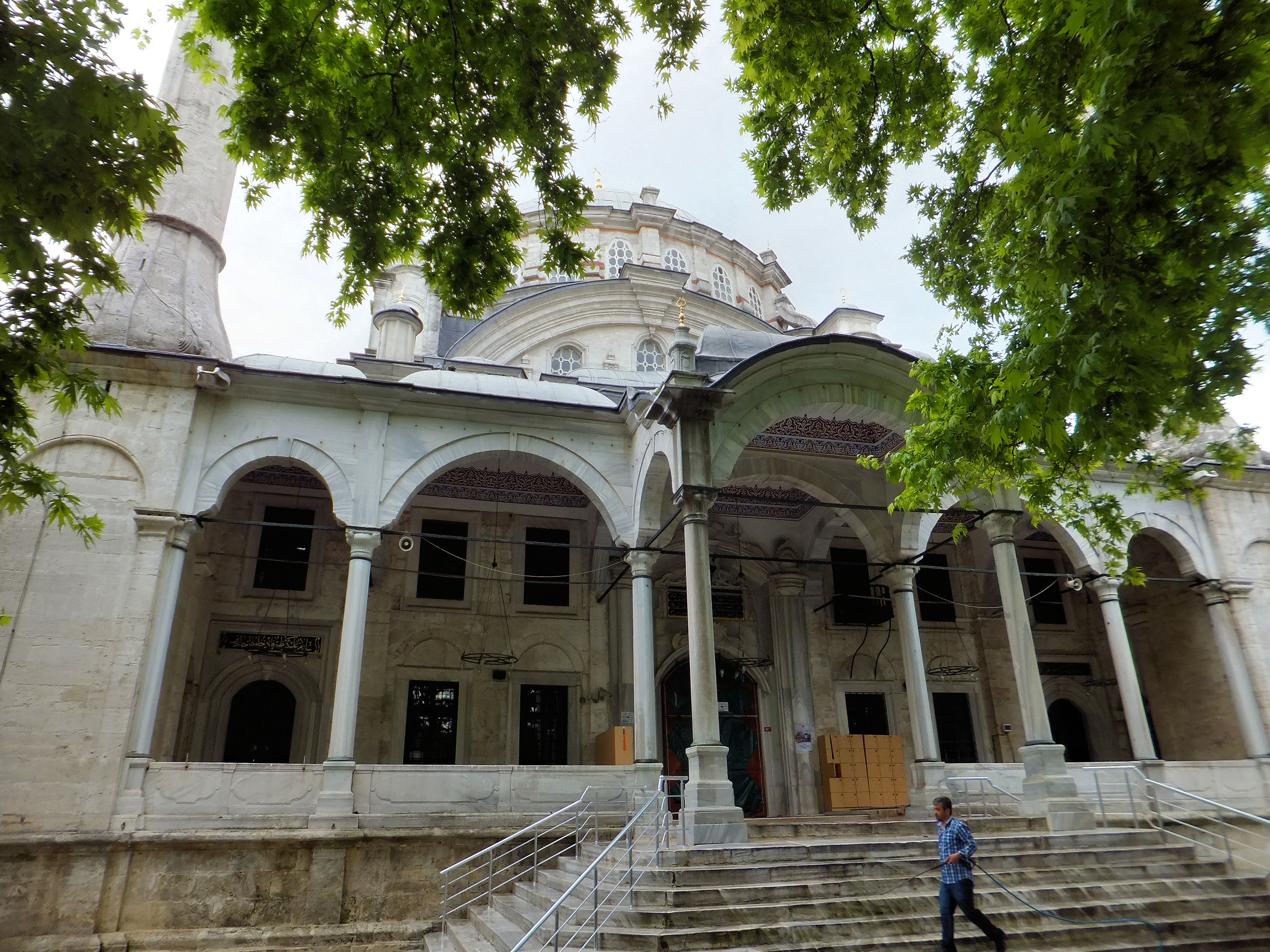
Front view of the mosque and its entrance portico

The mosque was built with high-quality stone in the Ottoman Baroque style that dominated the 18th century. Its design illustrates the degree of influence exerted by the earlier Beylerbeyi Mosque (1777–1778) built by Selim III's predecessor, Abdülhamid I, which incorporates a wide multi-story imperial pavilion (a kind of private lounge and reception area for the sultan) that stretches across the front façade of the mosque, in contrast with earlier mosques which were preceded by a courtyard or an arched entrance portico. The Selimiye Mosque also incorporates an imperial pavilion, although the design was further refined: the two wings of the pavilion are raised on a marble arcade and there is space between the two wings where a staircase and entrance portico lead into the mosque, allowing for a more monumental entrance to be created. The imperial pavilion itself contains various rooms and halls that functioned like a mini-palace for the sultan and his entourage.

The prayer hall is covered by a single large dome with pendentives at its corners. The side galleries that were usually present inside earlier mosques were in this case moved completely outside the prayer hall, along the building's exterior, leaving the interior more open and unencumbered. A long inscription in gold on a black background runs in a band around most of the hall, similar in style to the inscription inside the earlier Nuruosmaniye Mosque. It contains the Surah al-Fath (surah of 'victory'). The rest of the painted decoration inside the mosque today is not original and is painted in an anachronistic classical style. At the back of the prayer hall, opposite the mihrab, is a gallery or balcony that allows access between the mosque and the imperial pavilion. The sultan's loge (hünkâr mahfili), on the right-hand side near the prayer hall's entrance, is fully integrated into the lateral wall of the mosque and stands inside an extension of the imperial pavilion instead of being a balcony or box standing inside the prayer hall. The loge opens to the prayer hall through an arched opening that allowed an easy view of the congregation but not of the mihrab.

The building is notable overall for its high-quality stone decoration. The exterior is marked by the Baroque stone mouldings along its edges and the sculpted keystones of its arches, among other details. Inside, the mosque's marble minbar and mihrab are carved with rich Baroque motifs. The columns of the mosque's arcades have Ionic capitals. Characteristic of the 18th century are the small ornate birdhouses carved in stone on the mosque's corner turrets.

Exterior details and interior of the mosque

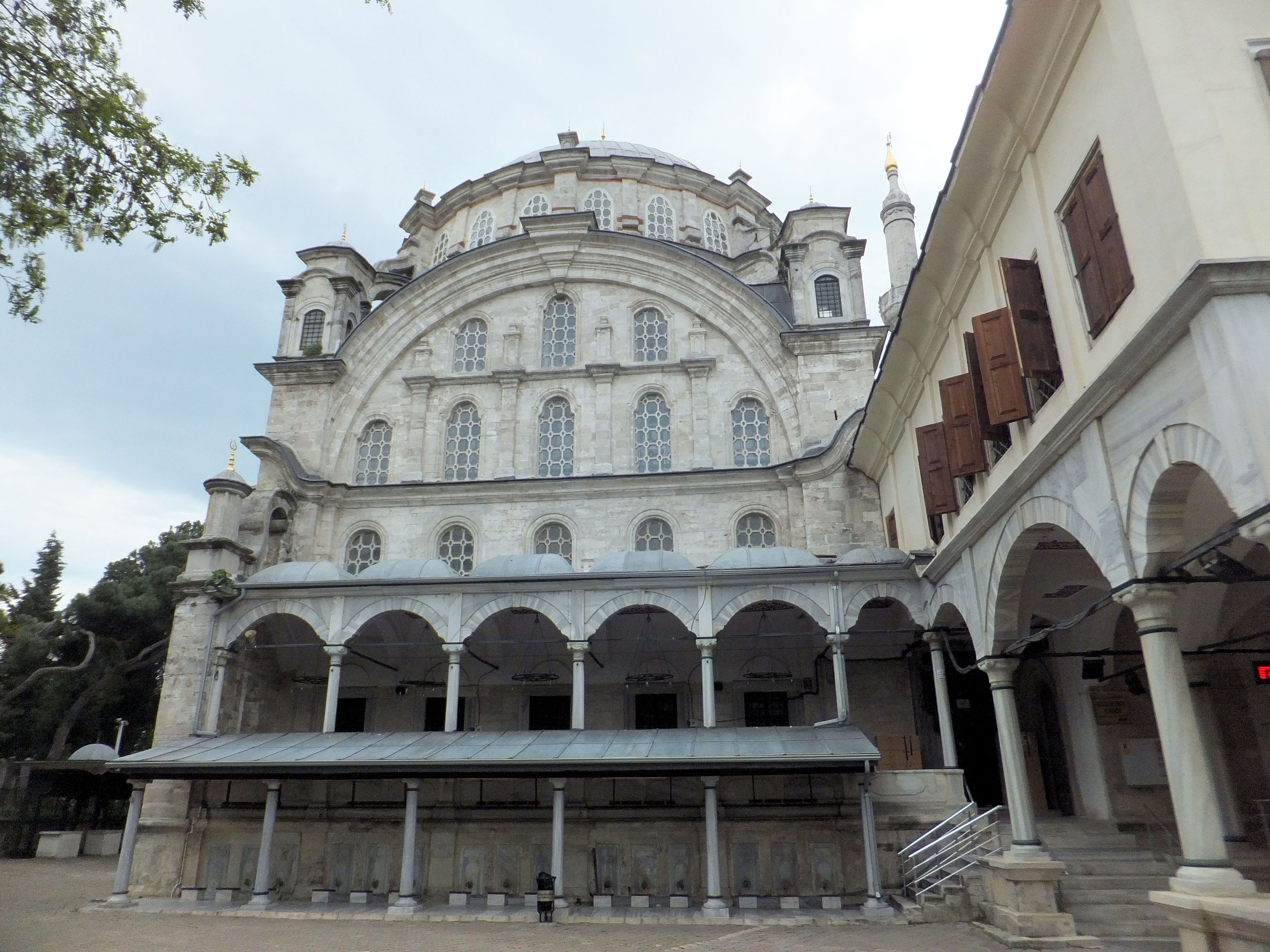
Side view of the mosque with the exterior lateral galleries

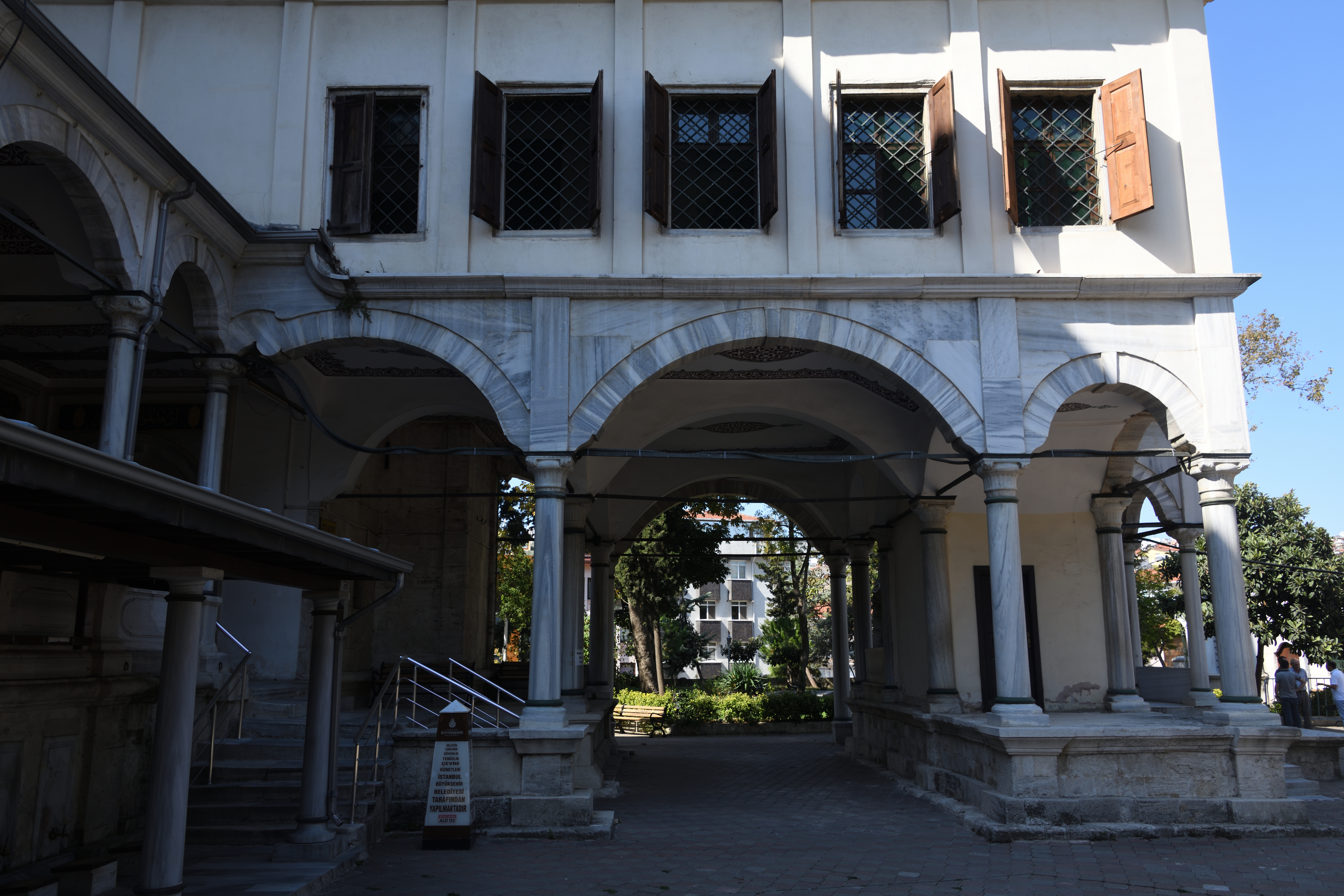
One of the wings of the imperial pavilion on the side of the mosque

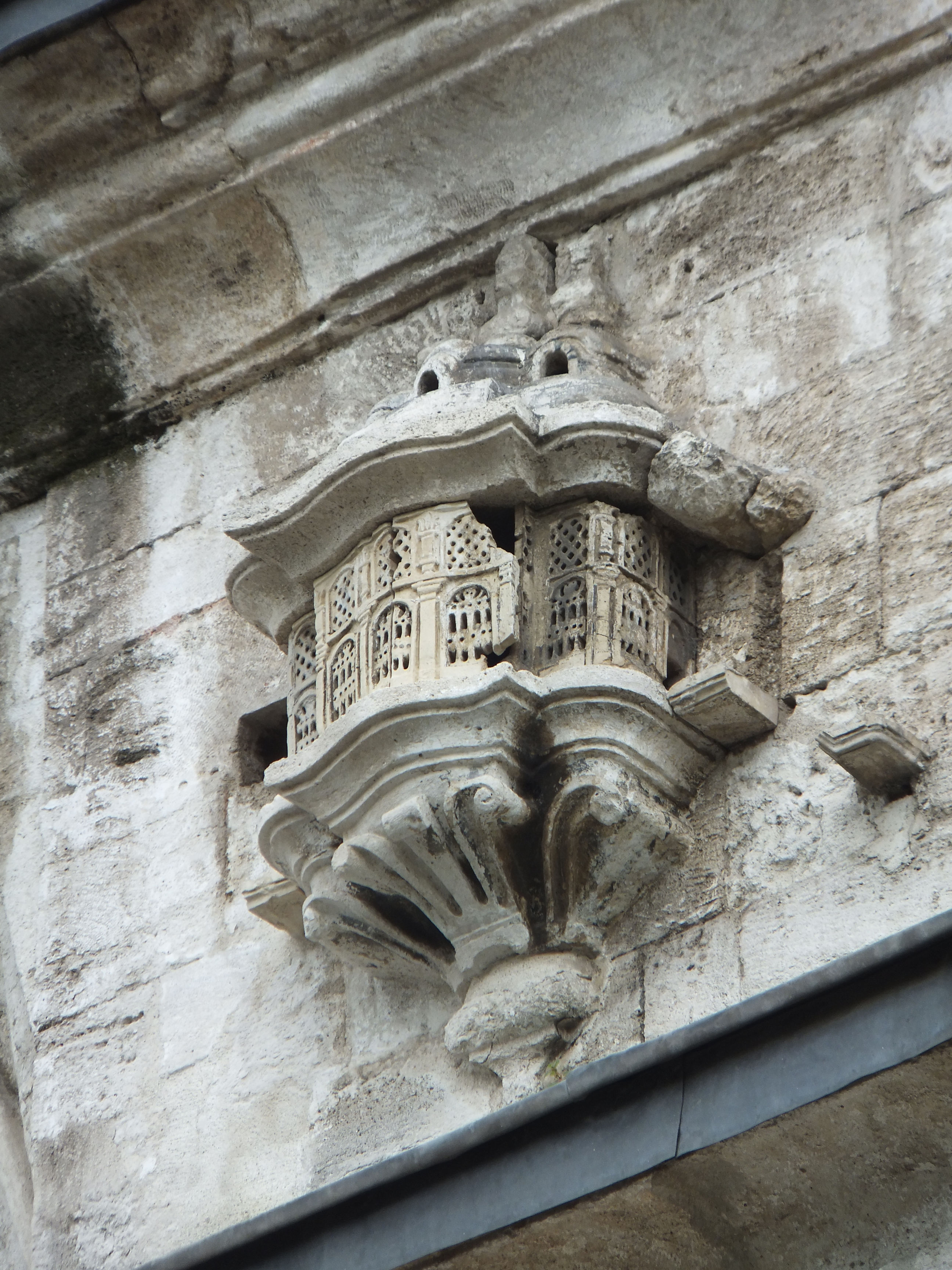
One of the carved stone birdhouses on the exterior of the mosque

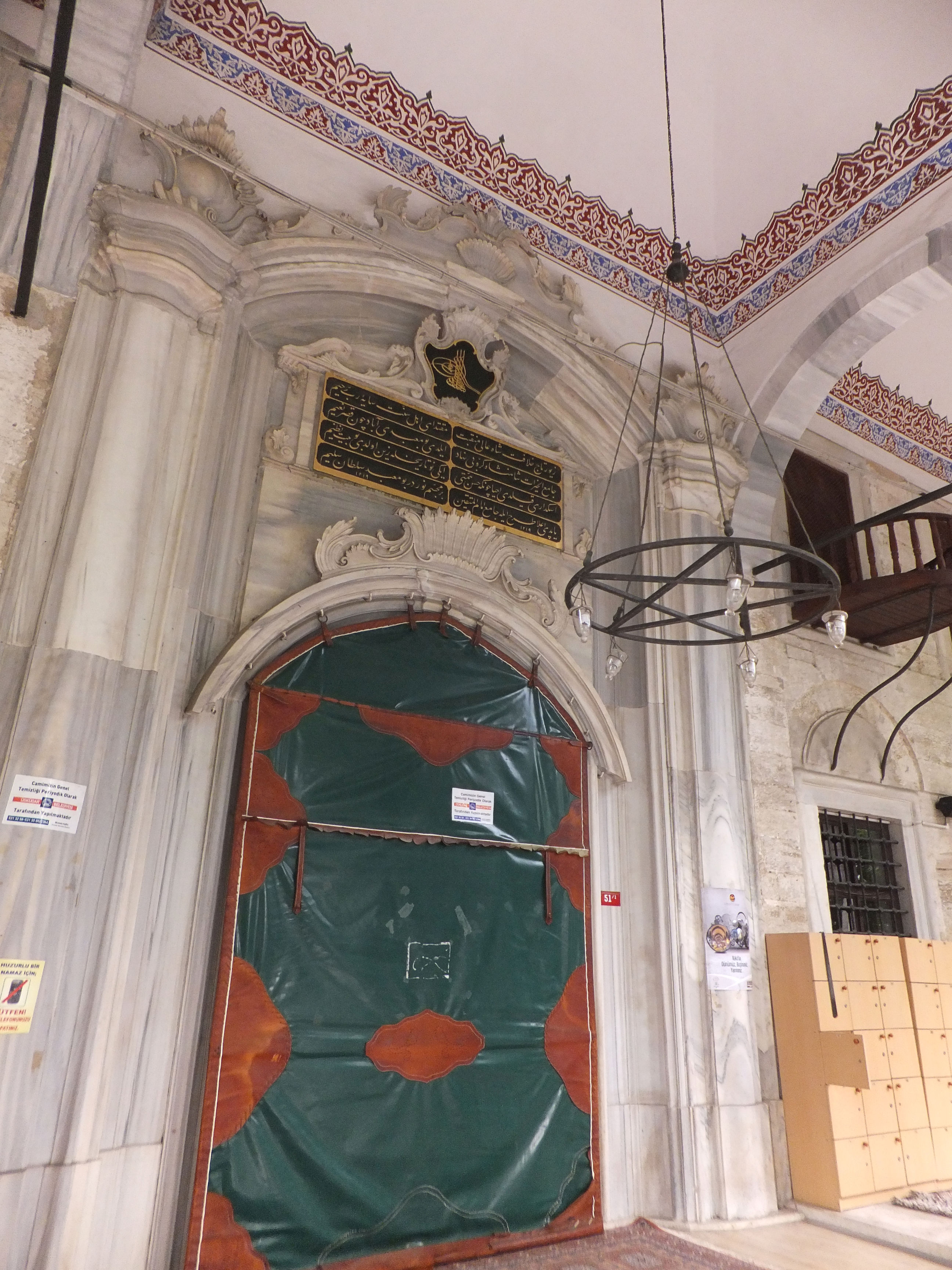
Entrance portal of the mosque

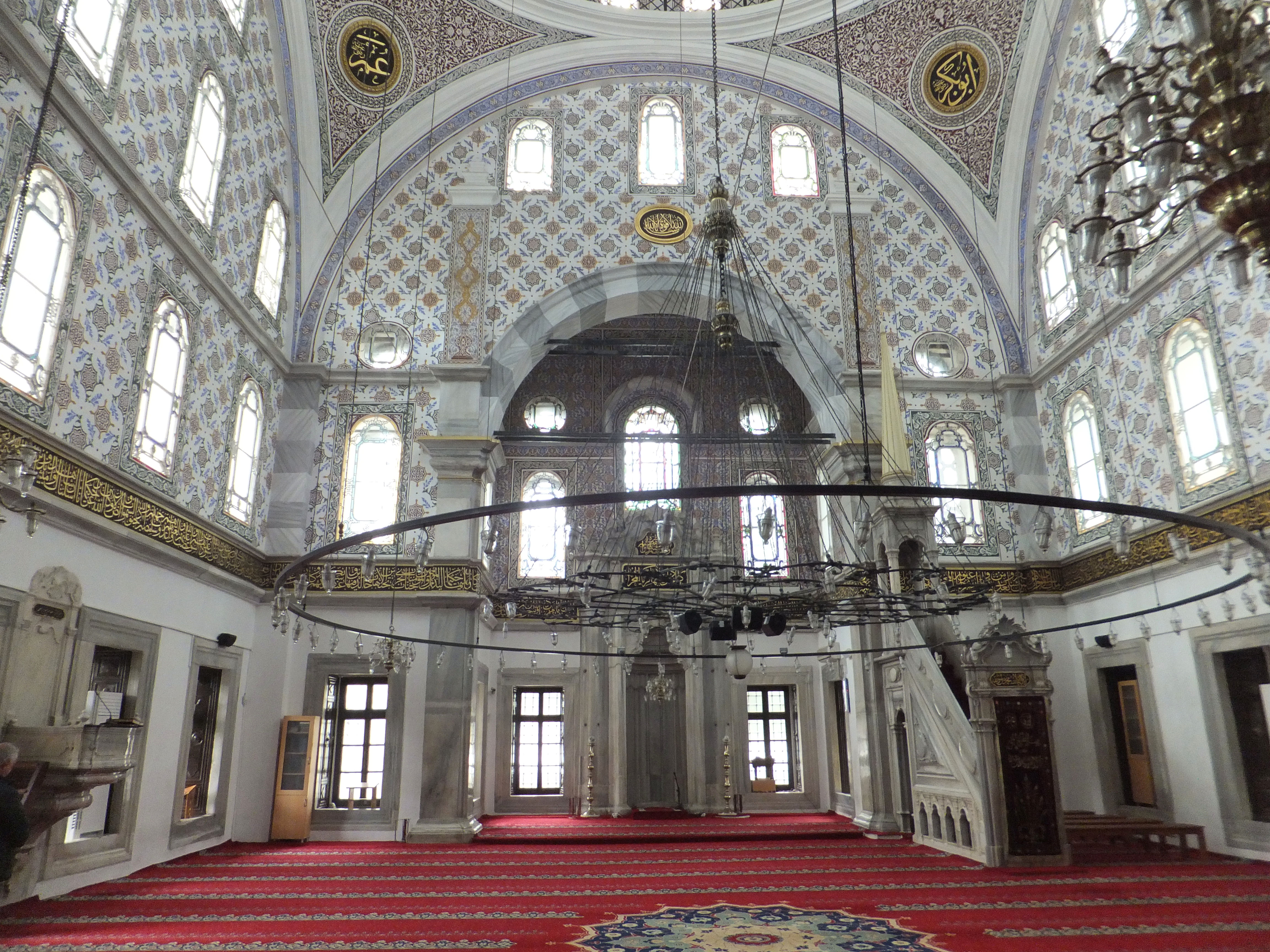
Interior of the mosque, looking towards the mihrab

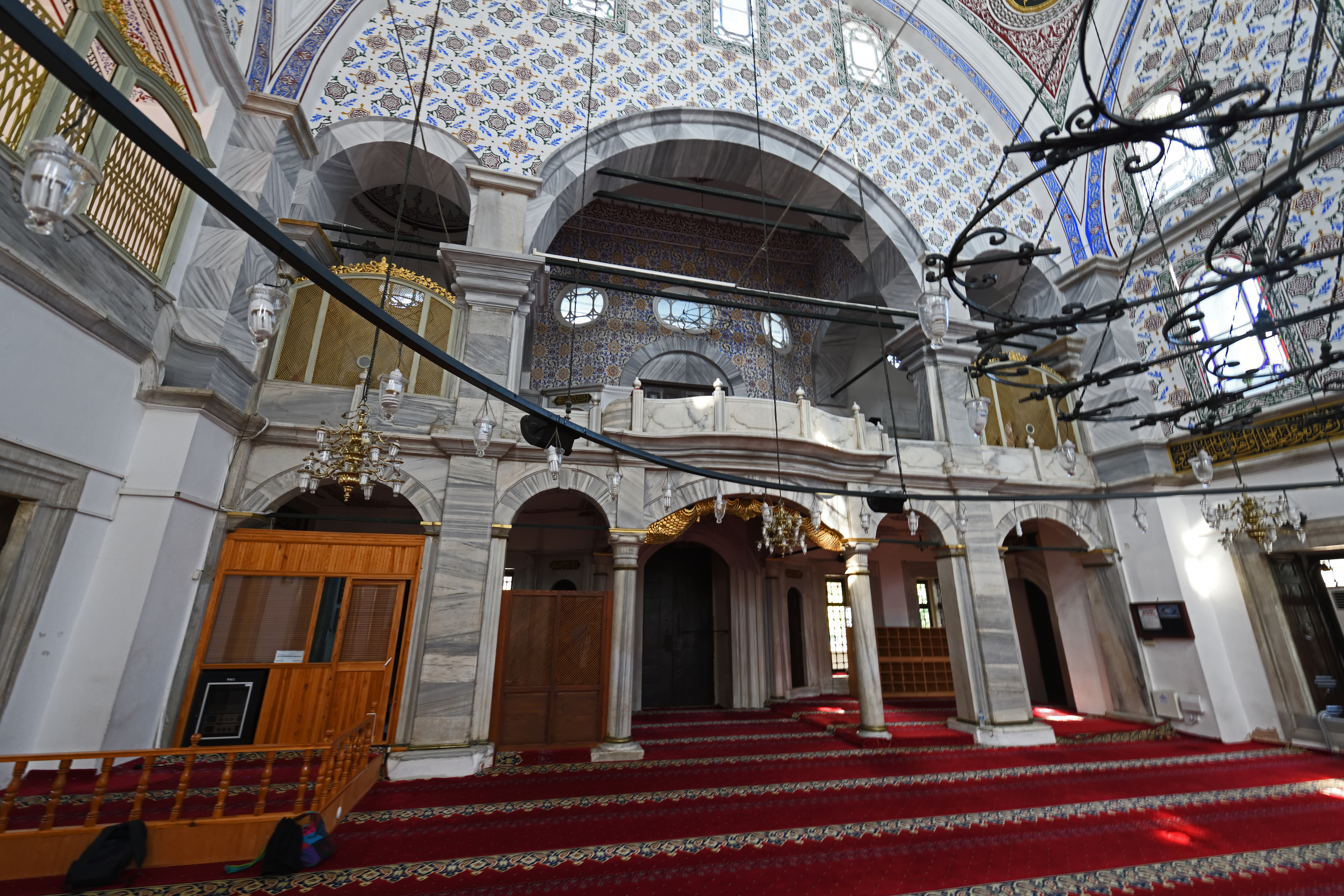
Interior, looking towards the rear gallery

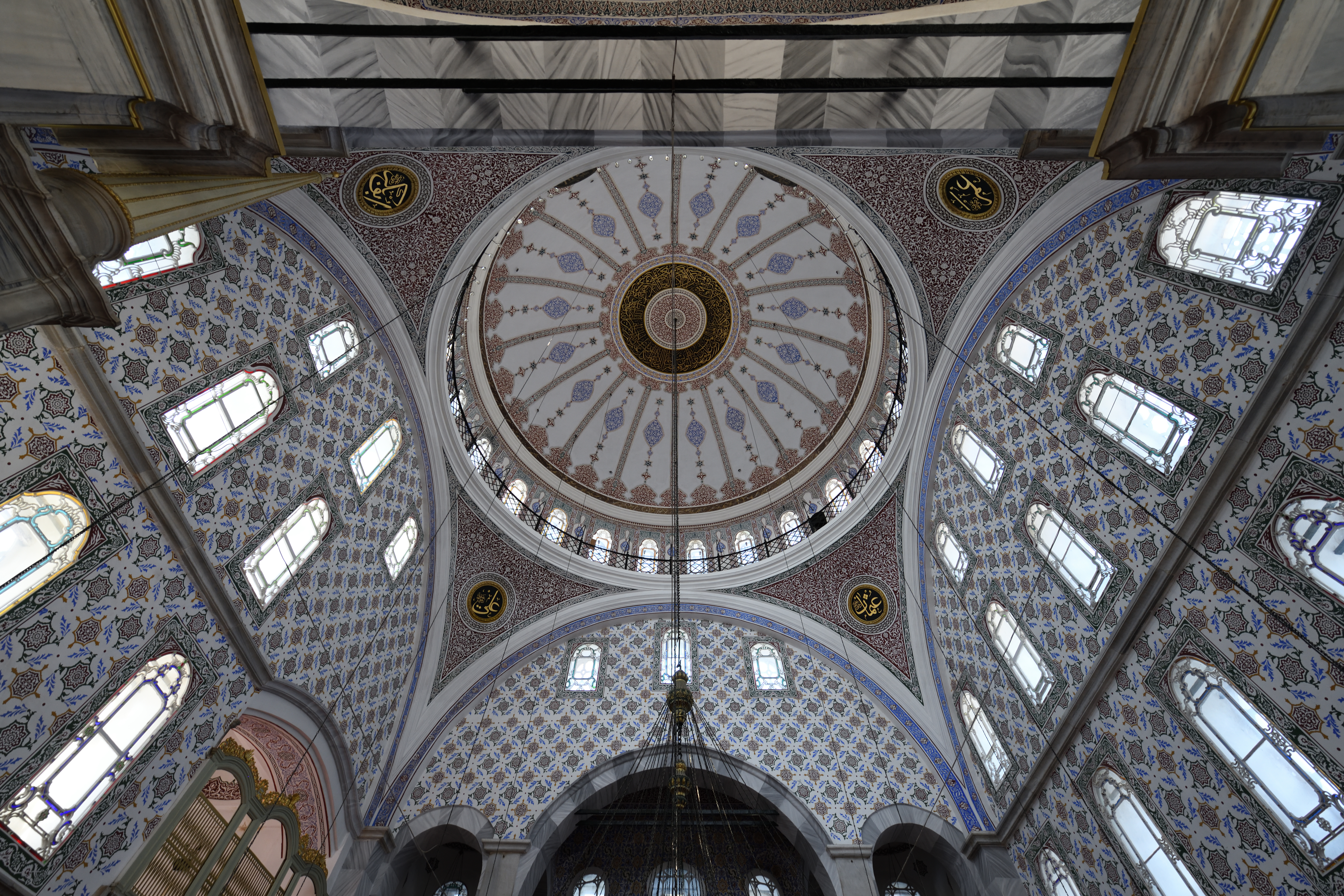
View of the mosque's dome

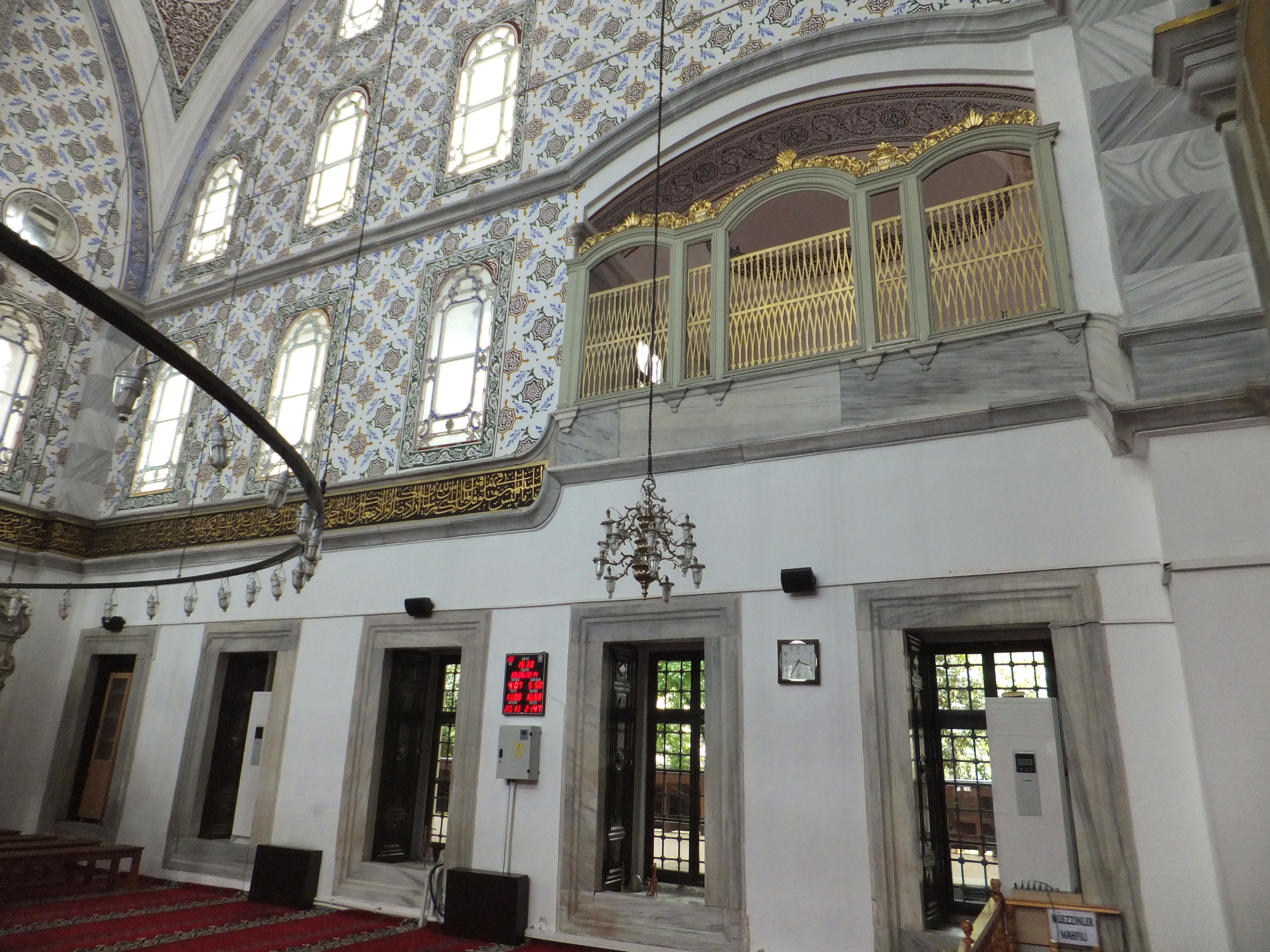
View of the sultan's loge (upper right)

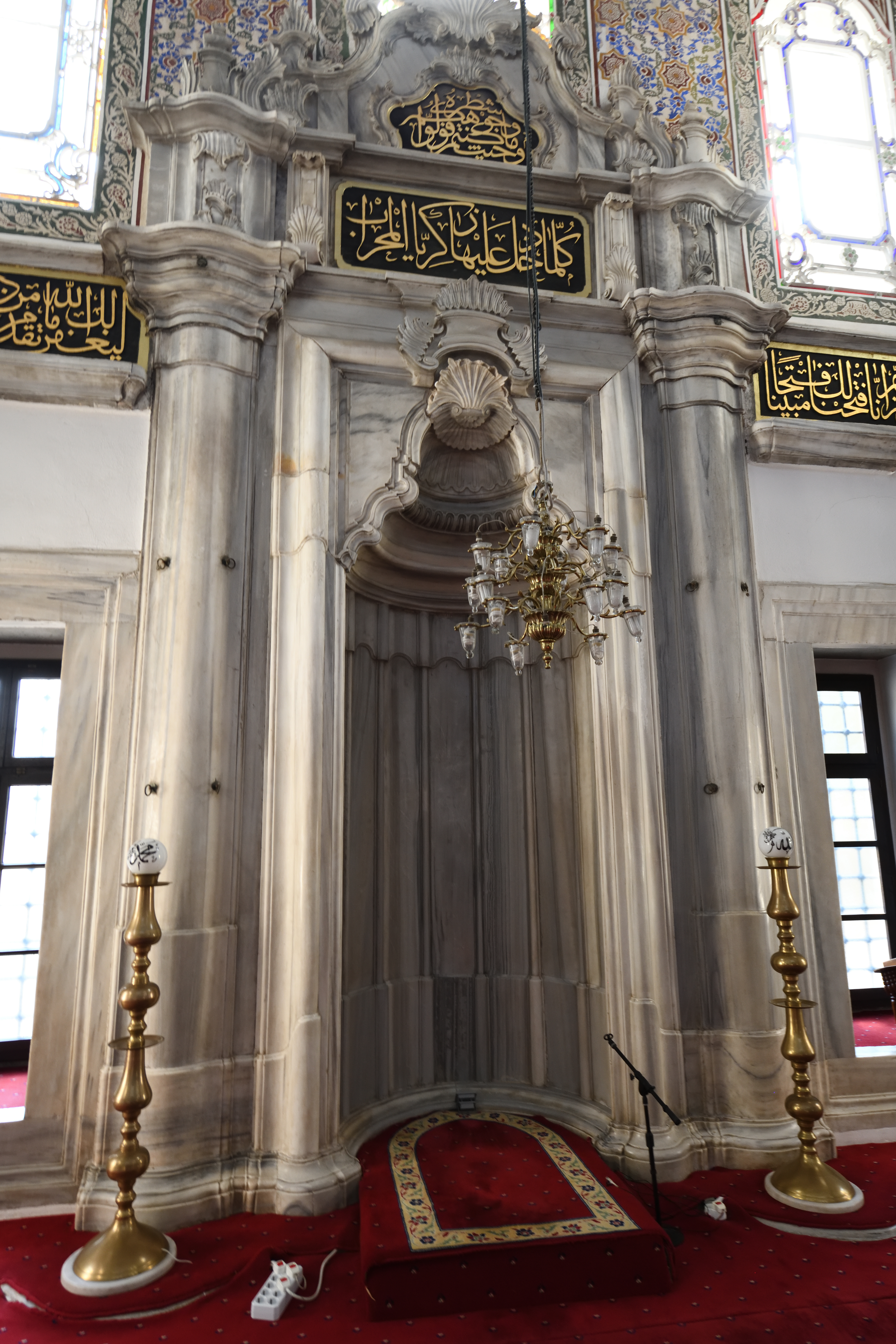
Mihrab of the mosque

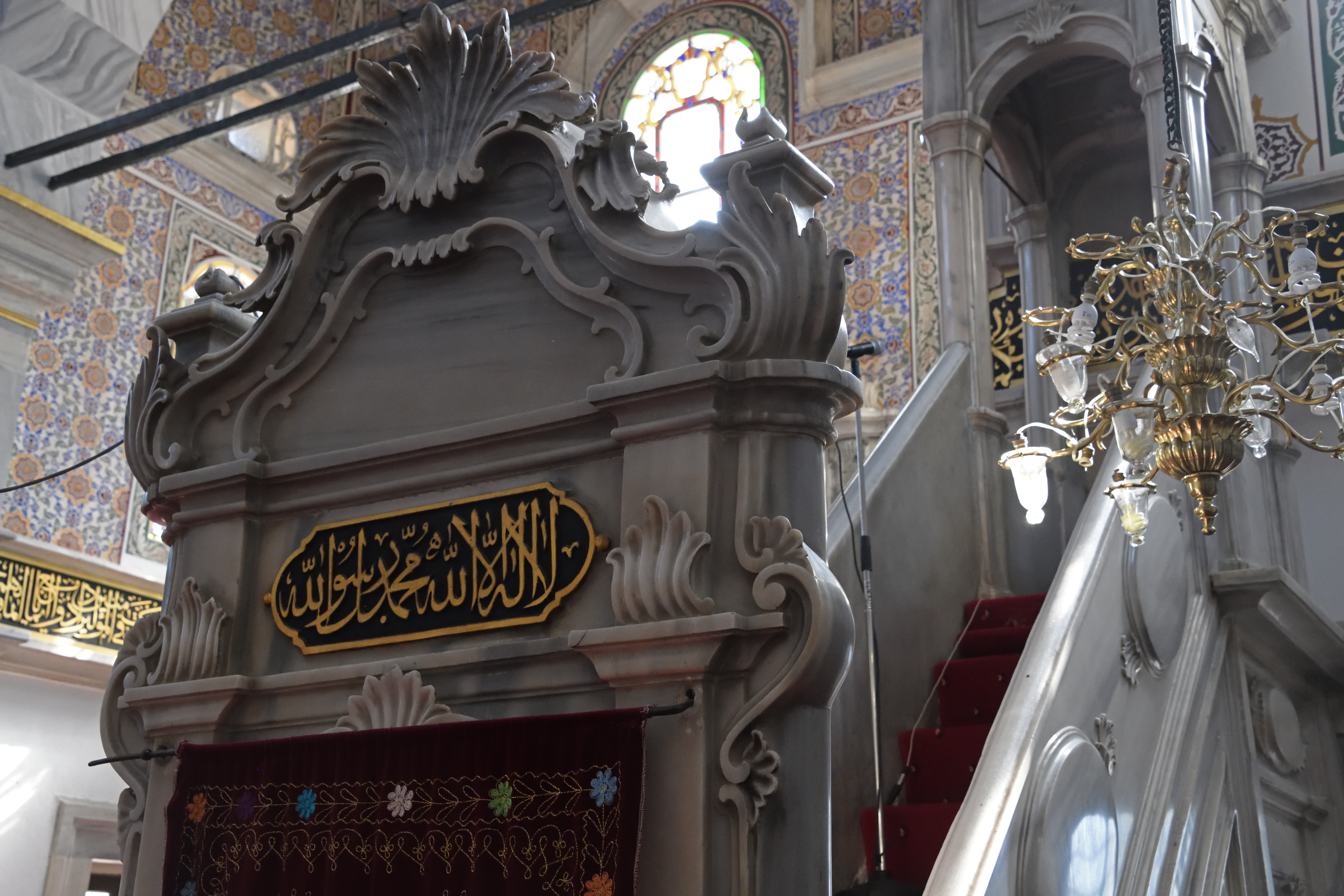
Details of the minbar

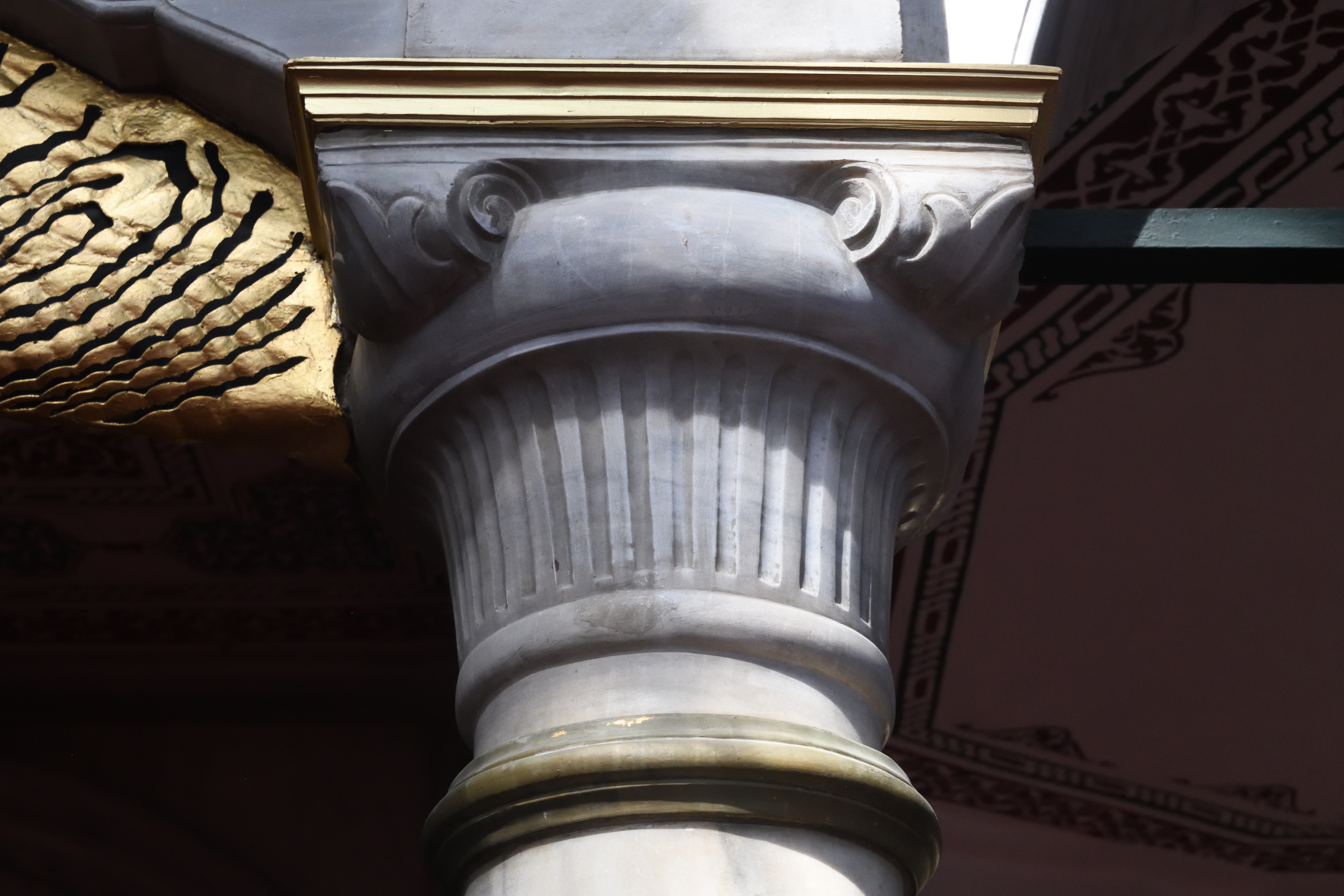
Example of Baroque-style Ionic capital in the mosque

== Hamam ==
Once used by both visitors to the mosque and by soldiers from the barracks, the complex's baths, known as the Selimiye Hamamı, have been allowed to fall into decay. In 2018 work began on restoring it and converting it to house a library and restaurant with a small museum area. This opened to the public in 2021.

== See also ==
- Ayazma Mosque

== Bibliography ==
- Goodwin, Godfrey (1971). A History of Ottoman Architecture. Thames & Hudson. ISBN 0-500-27429-0.
- Kuban, Doğan (2010). Ottoman Architecture. Translated by Mill, Adair. Antique Collectors' Club. ISBN 9781851496044.
- Rüstem, Ünver (2019). Ottoman Baroque: The Architectural Refashioning of Eighteenth-Century Istanbul. Princeton University Press. ISBN 9780691181875.
