= Selimiye Barracks =

Turkish army barracks

- Selimiye Kışlası
- Harem, Üsküdar, Istanbul, Turkey
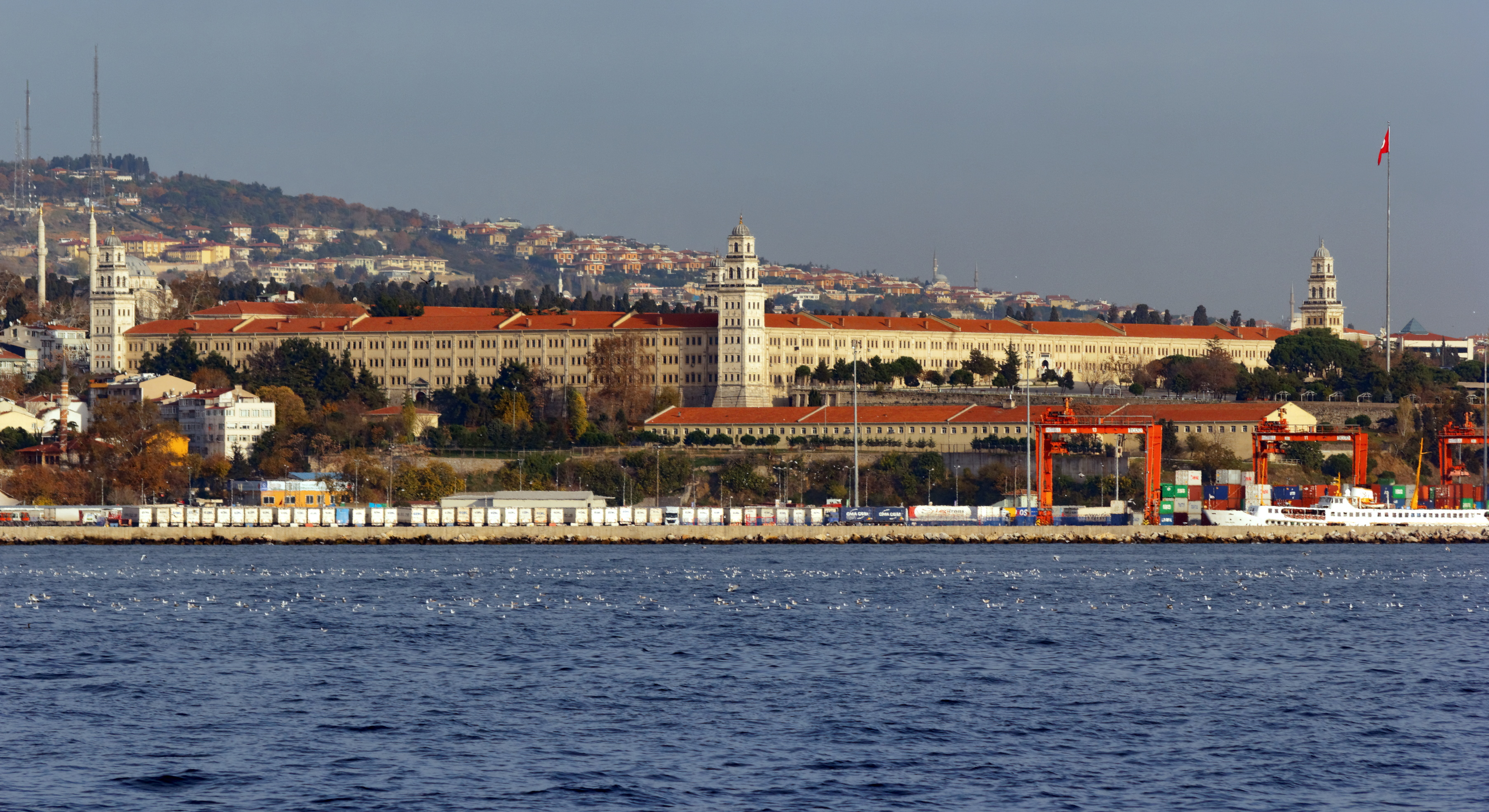
- Selimiye Barracks

Site information
- Operator: First Army HQ, Turkish Land Forces
- Controlled by: Asakir-i Mansure-i Muhammediye; Turkish Land Forces

Location
- Location within Istanbul
- Coordinates: 41°0′29″N 29°0′57″E

Site history
- Built: 1828; 198 years ago
- Built by: Sultan Mahmud II
- Battles/wars: Crimean War (1854–56),

Selimiye Barracks (Turkish: Selimiye Kışlası), also known as Scutari Barracks, is a Turkish Army barracks located in Selimiye in the Üsküdar district on the Asian side of Istanbul, Turkey. It was originally built in 1800 by Sultan Selim III for the soldiers of the newly established Nizam-ı Cedid (literally "New Order") within the framework of the Ottoman military reform efforts. Today, it serves as the headquarters of the First Army of Turkish Land Forces.

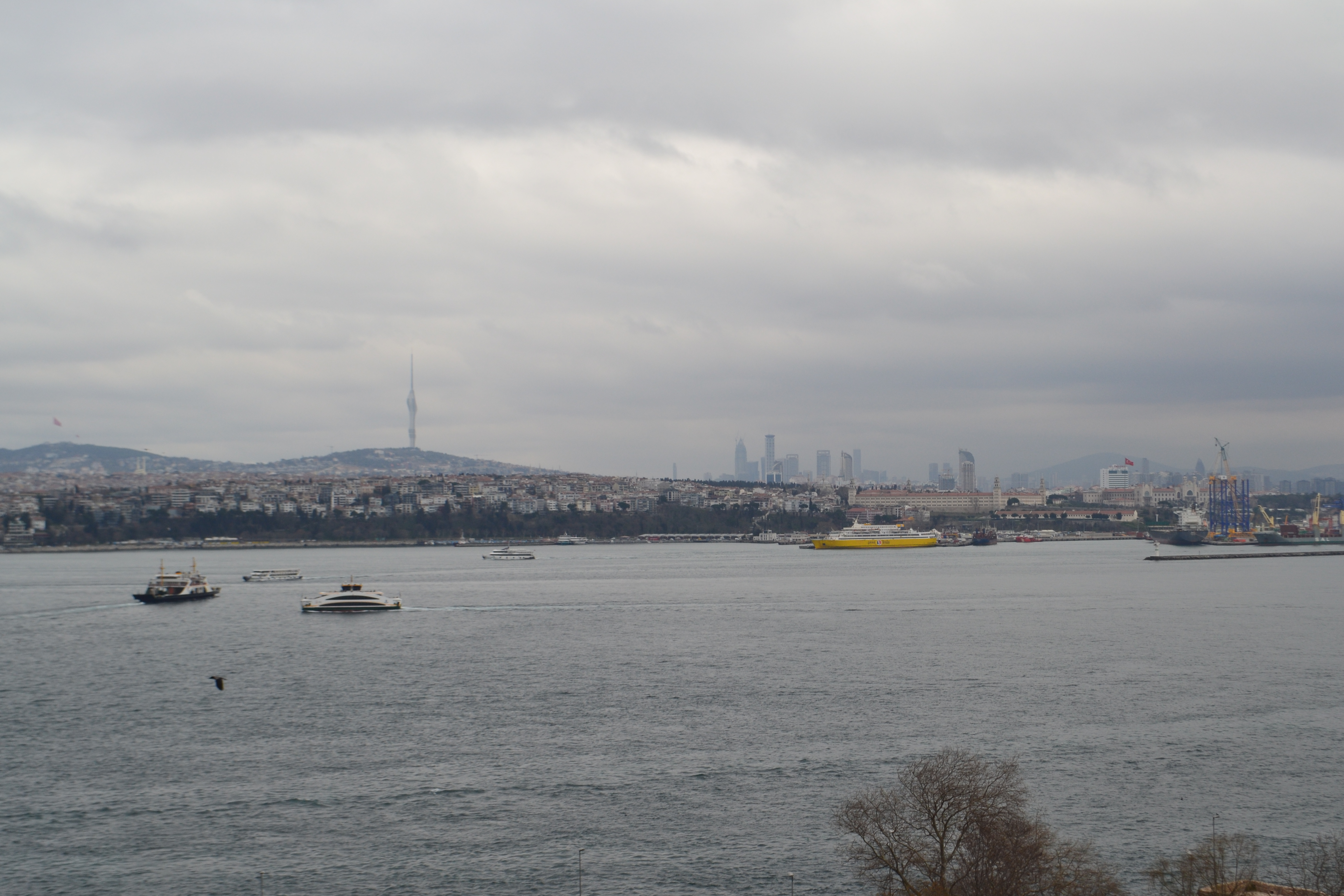
Photo of the Selimiye Barracks, photo taken from Topkapı Palace. The Barracks can be seen on the right side, right behind the ship with a yellow hull.

The Barracks is situated in the Harem neighbourhood between Üsküdar and Kadıköy, close to the Sea of Marmara. The highway connecting the ferry terminal and the overland bus terminal to the motorway O.2 Istanbul-Ankara runs right past the barracks.

== Construction ==
The original wooden barracks was designed by Krikor Balyan but was burnt down in 1806 by rebel Janissaries, who were resisting the sultan's reforms. Sultan Mahmud II commissioned the rebuilding of the barracks in stone in 1825 and the work was completed on 6 February 1828. During the reign of Sultan Abdülmecid I, the barracks were renovated twice, first in 1842–43 and again in 1849–50. During this process, a tower seven stories in height was added to each of the four corners, giving the barracks its current appearance. The barracks is a vast rectangular building measuring 200 m × 267 m (656 ft × 876 ft) with a large parade ground in the centre. Three of the wings have three floors but the eastern wing only has two floors due to the sloping terrain.

== Crimean War ==
See also Renkioi Hospital

During the Crimean War (1854–56), the barracks were allocated to the British Army, which was on its way from Britain to the Crimea. After the troops of its 33rd and 41st foot regiments left for the front, the barracks was converted into a temporary military hospital.

On 4 November 1854, Florence Nightingale arrived in Scutari with 37 volunteer nurses. They cared for thousands of wounded and infected soldiers until she returned home in 1857 as a heroine.

The Scutari hospital was unventilated and built on top of a damaged sewer. During the war around 6,000 soldiers died in the Selimiye Barracks, mostly as the result of a cholera epidemic. The dead were buried at a plot near the barracks, which later became the Haydarpaşa Cemetery. The death rate didn't drop until a sanitary commission repaired the sewers and improved ventilation at the hospital.

Today, the northernmost tower of the barracks houses a small museum partly in memory of Nightingale.

Crimean War

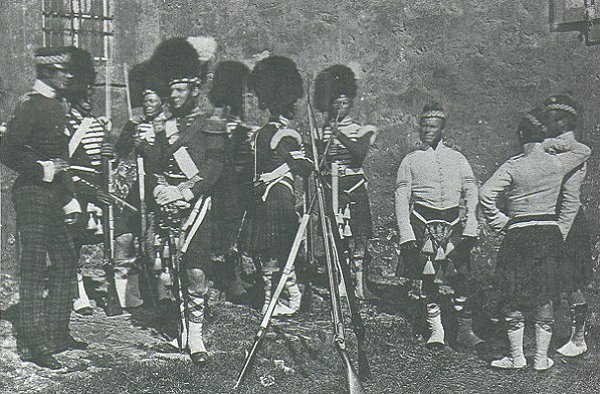
An early photo, taken at Scutari, of officers and men of the 93rd Highland Regiment, shortly before their engagement in the Crimean War, 1854.

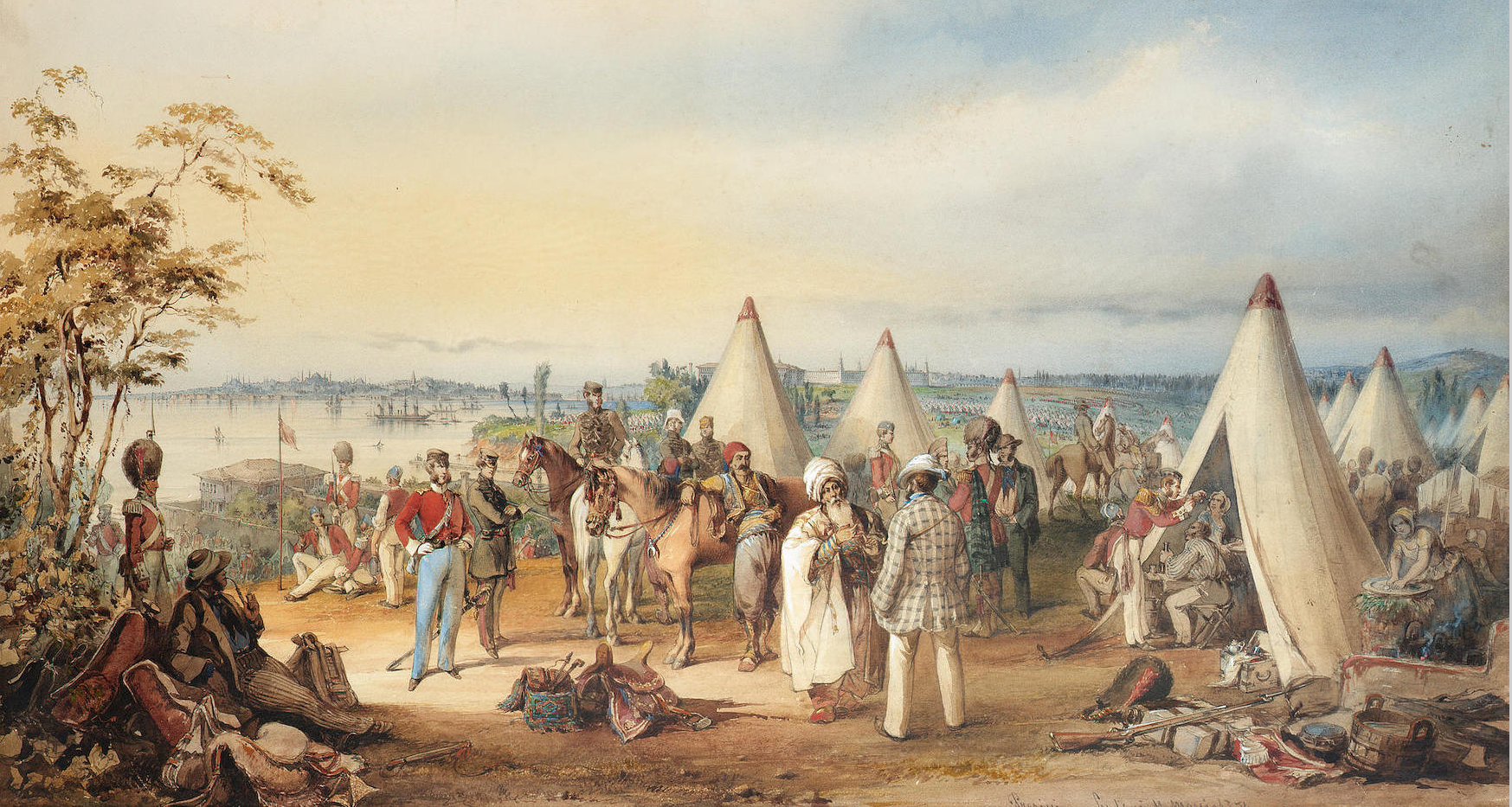
The British Army at Scutari, 1854, by Amedeo Preziosi

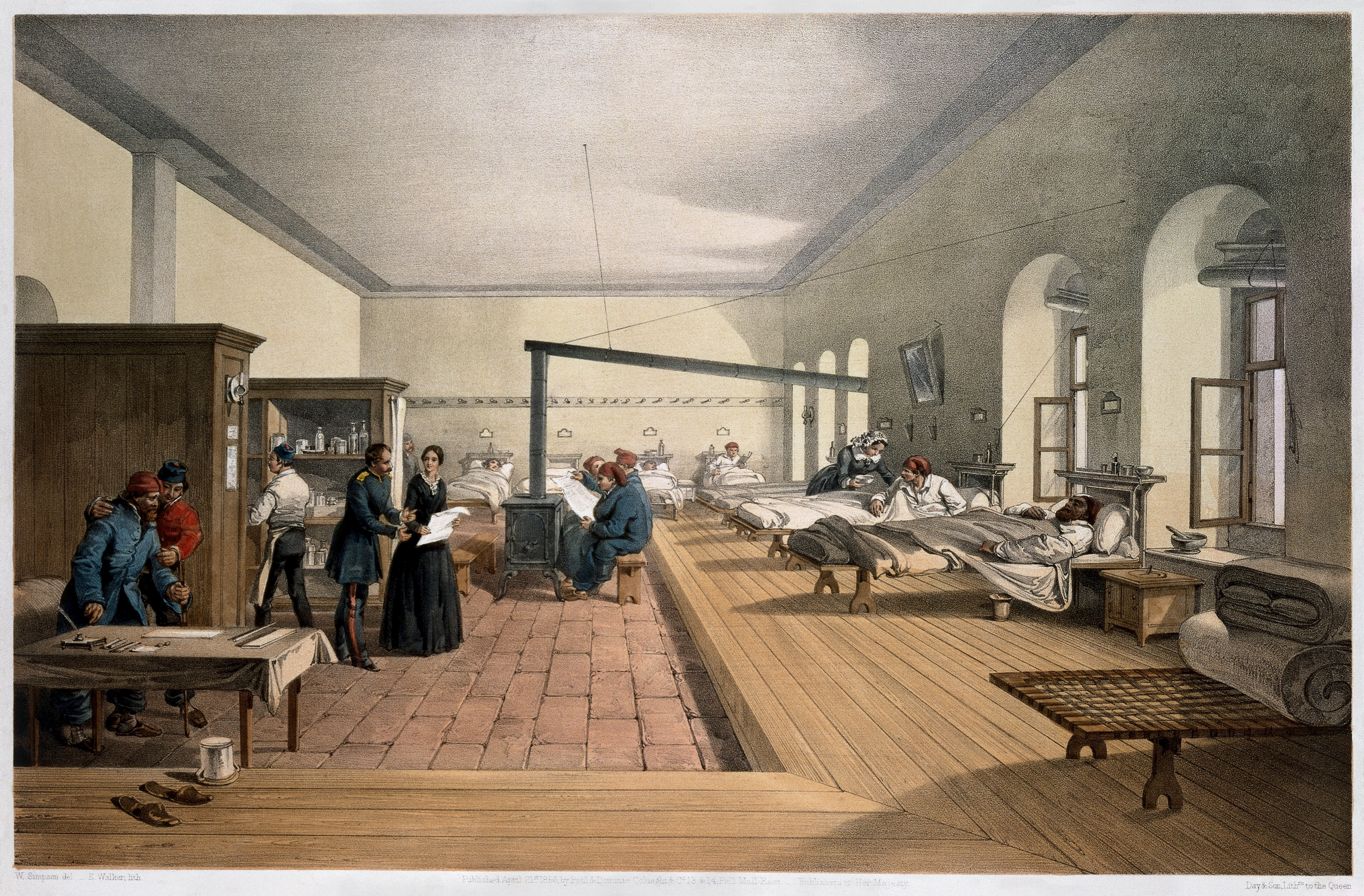
An 1856 lithograph of the Selimiye barracks as a hospital during the Crimean War.

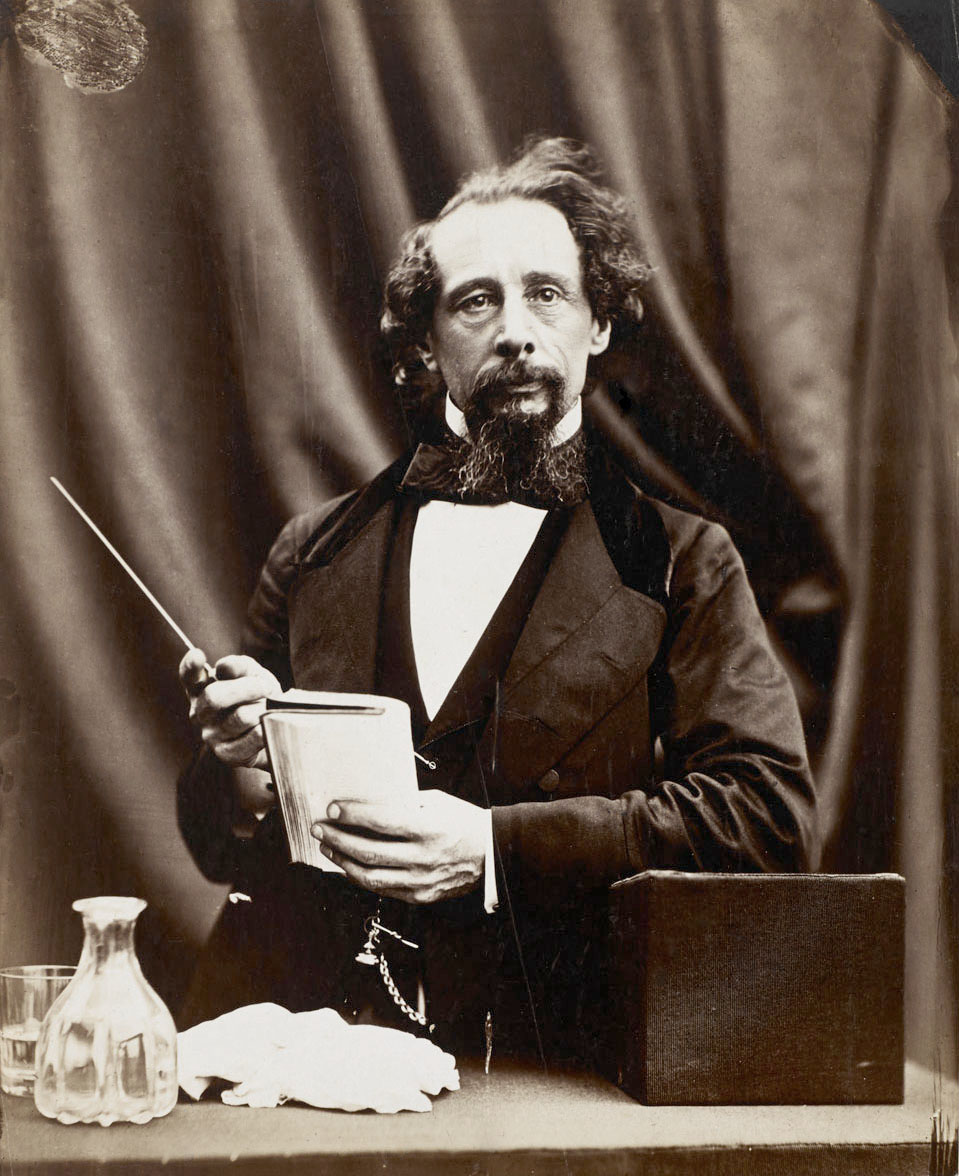
Charles Dickens was one of the more famous donors to the hospital.
