= Beylerbeyi (disambiguation) =

Beylerbeyi can refer to:

- Beylerbeyi, neighbourhood in Üsküdar, Istanbul, Turkey
- Beylerbeyi, Sarayköy, village in Turkey
- Beylerbeyi Palace, Ottoman palace in Istanbul, Turkey
  - Beylerbeyi Palace Tunnel
- Beylerbeyi event, 1589 revolt in the Ottoman Empire

== See also ==
- Beylerbey, Ottoman provincial governor, ranking below the grand vizier
