= Surp Krikor Lusavoriç Armenian Church, Kuzguncuk =

Armenian Apostolic church in Istanbul, Turkey

Surp Krikor Lusavoriç Armenian Church
- Սուրբ Գրիգոր Լուսաւորիչ եկեղեցի Surp Krikor Lusavoriç Ermeni Kilisesi
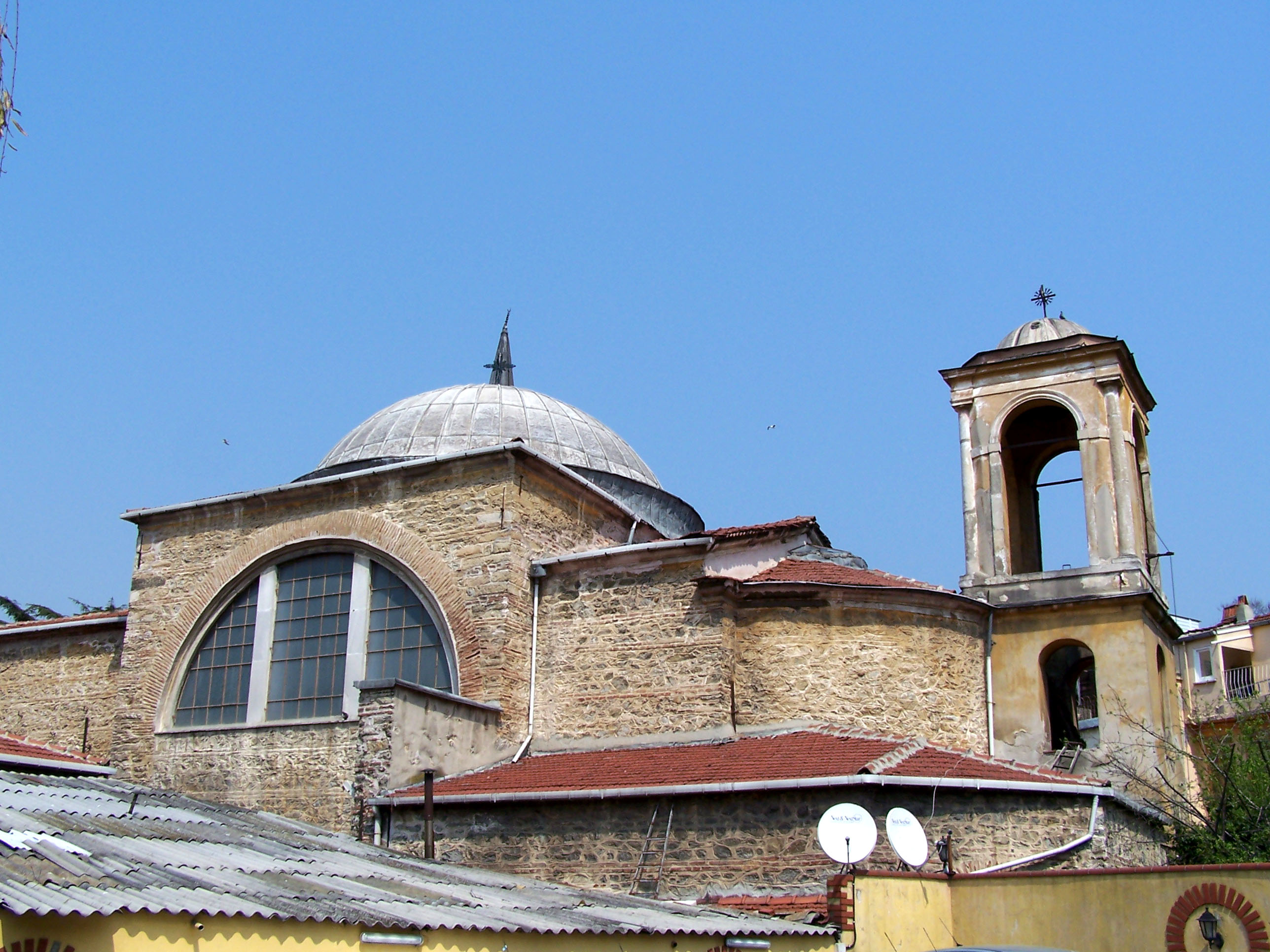
- The dome and the belfry of the Surp Krikor Lusavoriç Armenian Church in Kuzguncuk, Istanbul.

- Location of the church in Istanbul , Turkey.

Religion
- Affiliation: Armenian Apostolic Church
- Status: Active

Location
- Location: Çarşı Cad. 49, Kuzguncuk, Üsküdar Istanbul, Turkey
- Coordinates: 41°02′12″N 29°01′49″E

Architecture
- Architect: yes
- Style: Armenian
- Completed: 1861

Surp Krikor Lusavoriç Armenian Church (Armenian: Սուրբ Գրիգոր Լուսաւորիչ եկեղեցի, Turkish: Surp Krikor Lusavoriç Ermeni Kilisesi) is an Armenian Apostolic church dedicated to Saint Gregory the Illuminator in Kuzguncuk, Üsküdar, Istanbul, Turkey. It was rebuilt in 1861.

== History ==
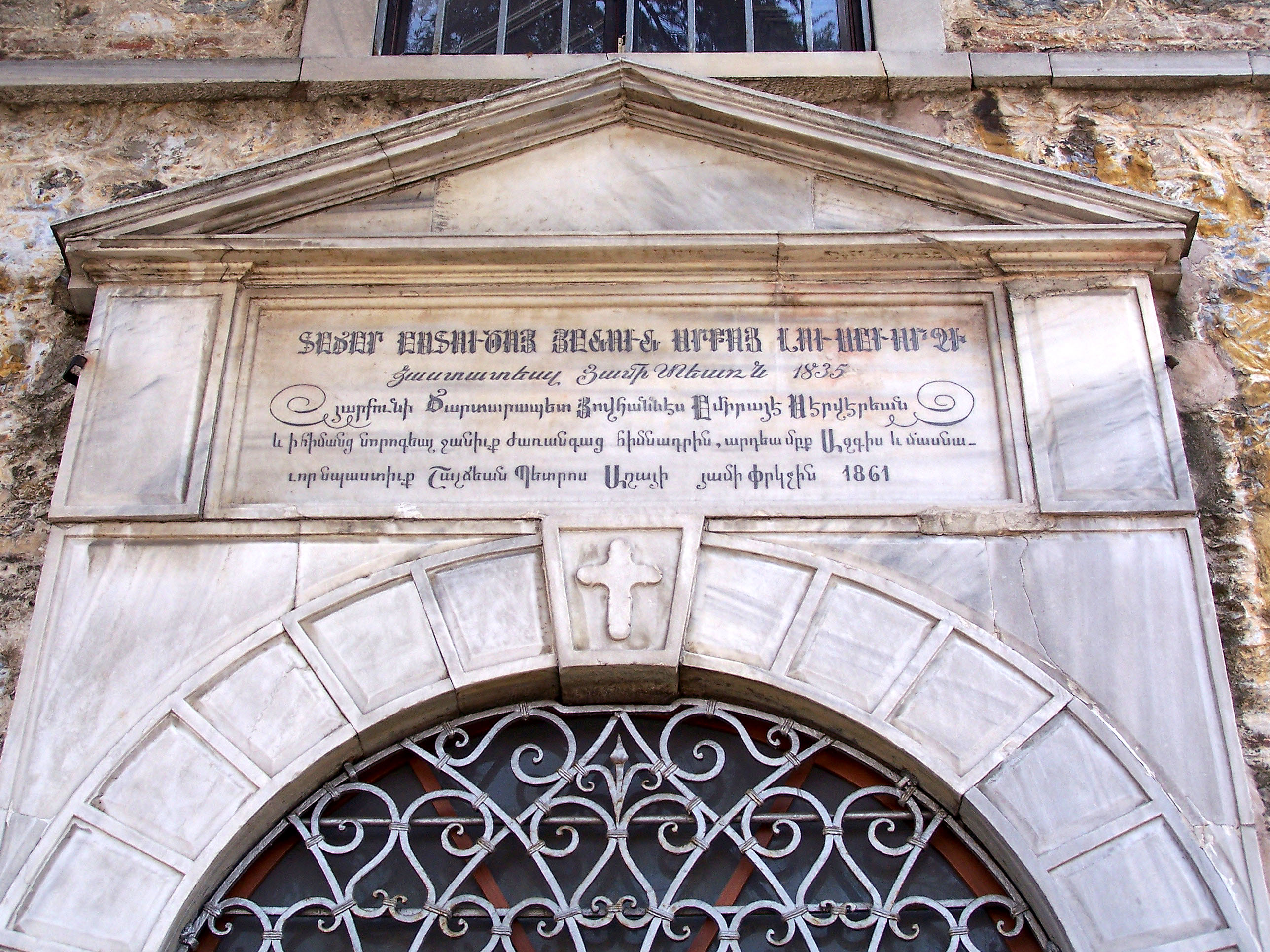
Armenian-language inscription above the main entrance.

A wooden church building was constructed for the Armenian community in Kuzguncuk by the court architect Ohannes Amira Serverian during the time of Armenian Patriarch Stepanos III of Constantinople (r. 1831–1839) and was opened on 11 May 1835. According to an inscription, the current church, funded by Bedros Agha Shaldjian, was rebuilt in 1861 and replaced the wooden building. The church is across the passenger-ferry pier of Kuzguncuk in Üsküdar district on the Asian coast of Bosphorus in Istanbul, Turkey.

== Architecture ==
Strict rules of construction and renovation imposed by the Ottoman Empire are seen as the cause for the lack of architectural aesthetics of Armenian churches in Istanbul built mostly during that era. The Surp Krikor Lusavoriç Armenian Church in Kuzguncuk makes an exception with its cruciform plan, Byzantine dome, and reliefs.

The rectangular-plan church building with walls of unhewn stone and double rows of brick has three sections and a narthex. The dome on the roof is supported by four pillars. The church has five doors, one main entrance and two doors at each side. Three large windows on each side of the building and over the main entrance illuminate the interior. On the northern and southern walls, there are Byzantine-style pseudo windows decorated with paintings of saints. The building is also lit by skylights in the semi-dome to the east. The vaulted main entrance is flanked by a room with an apse on each side. The apse is roofed by a semi-dome. An Armenian inscription in five lines is over the main entrance, and an Armenian prayer is inscribed on the large arch. A painting of Saint Gregory the Illuminator is on the left interior wall behind the main entrance. The altar's upper part is gilded. The wooden guard rail in front of the altar is decorated with flower and leaf figures made by Kalust Agha Kemhacyan, who provided timber to the Sultan's court. In 1944, a stairway was built to the chair gallery on the northeast side.

The two-story belfry with a pyramidal roof surmounted by a cupola is immediately behind the apse in the east. A fountain was added to the churchyard in 1910. In 1967, ornaments were added to the church's interior.

== Upon an inscription, the church underwent a restoration between 2003 and 2004. It was reopened in 2005 after consecration by Armenian Patriarch Mesrob II Mutafyan of Constantinople (r. 1998–2016). ==
Next to the northern wall, a preacher of the church Episcope Hovhannes Setyan (1800–1875) is buried.

== School ==
In 1853, a co-educational school named Lusavoriçyan was established in a building on the same land with the church to meet the educational needs of the growing Armenian population in the Kuzguncuk area.

== Social activities ==
The small neighborhood of Kuzguncuk has a multi-religious community. In addition to the Armenian church, there is the Agios Georgios Greek Orthodox Church, the Agios Panteleimonas Greek Orthodox Church, the Bet Nissim Synagogue, and the Üryanizade Mosque close to each other. A group of Christian, Jewish, and Muslim students and adults visited the church in February 2008 as part of a social activity organized by the local women residents of the three religions.

The church is often visited by schools as well as by domestic and foreign tourists.
