= Birgül =

Birgül is a feminine Turkish name meaning "one rose", and it may refer to:

== Given name ==
- Birgül Oğuz (born 1981), Turkish writer.
- Birgül Sadıkoğlu (born 2000), Turkish women's footballer

== Surname ==
- Refika Birgül (born 1980), Turkish female food writer
