= Kuzguncuk =

- Neighbourhood
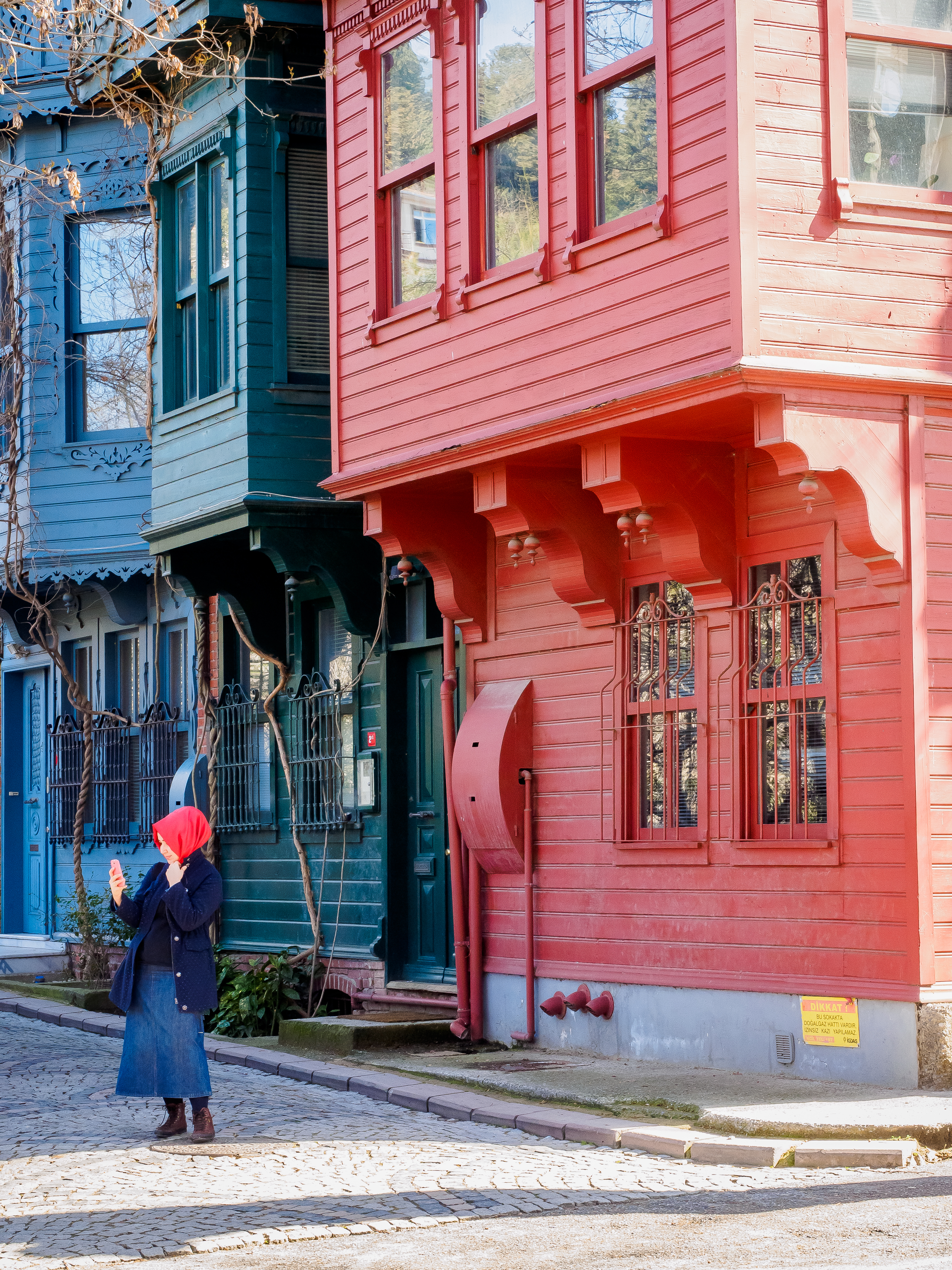

- Location within Turkey Location within Istanbul
- Coordinates: 41°02′12″N 29°01′47″E
- Country: Turkey
- Province: Istanbul
- District: Üsküdar
- Population (2022): 4,151
- Time zone: UTC+3 (TRT)
- Postal code: 34674
- Area code: 0216

Kuzguncuk is a neighbourhood in the municipality and district of Üsküdar, Istanbul Province, Turkey. Its population is 4,151 (2022). It is on the Asian side of the Bosphorus. The neighborhood is centered on a valley opening to the Bosphorus and is somewhat isolated from the main part of the city, being surrounded by nature preserves, cemeteries, and a military installation. It is a quiet neighborhood with streets lined with antique Ottoman wooden houses.

Kuzguncuk is bordered on the north by Beylerbeyi, on the east by Burhaniye, on the south by İcadiye and Sultantepe, and on the west by the Bosphorus. On the other side of the Bosphorus is Beşiktaş. The Otoyol 1 highway separates the neighborhood from Burhaniye.

== History ==
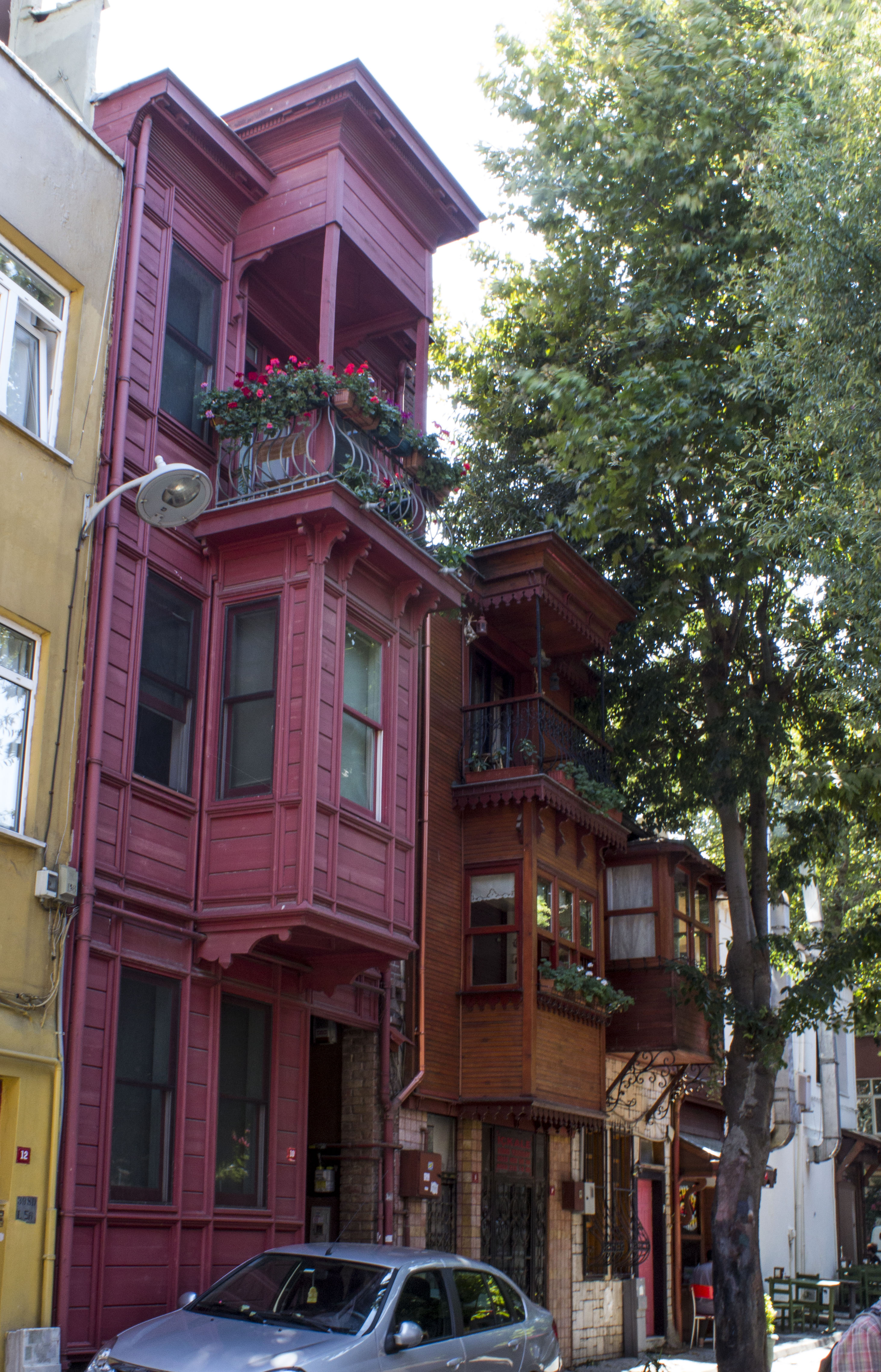
Kuzguncuk streets

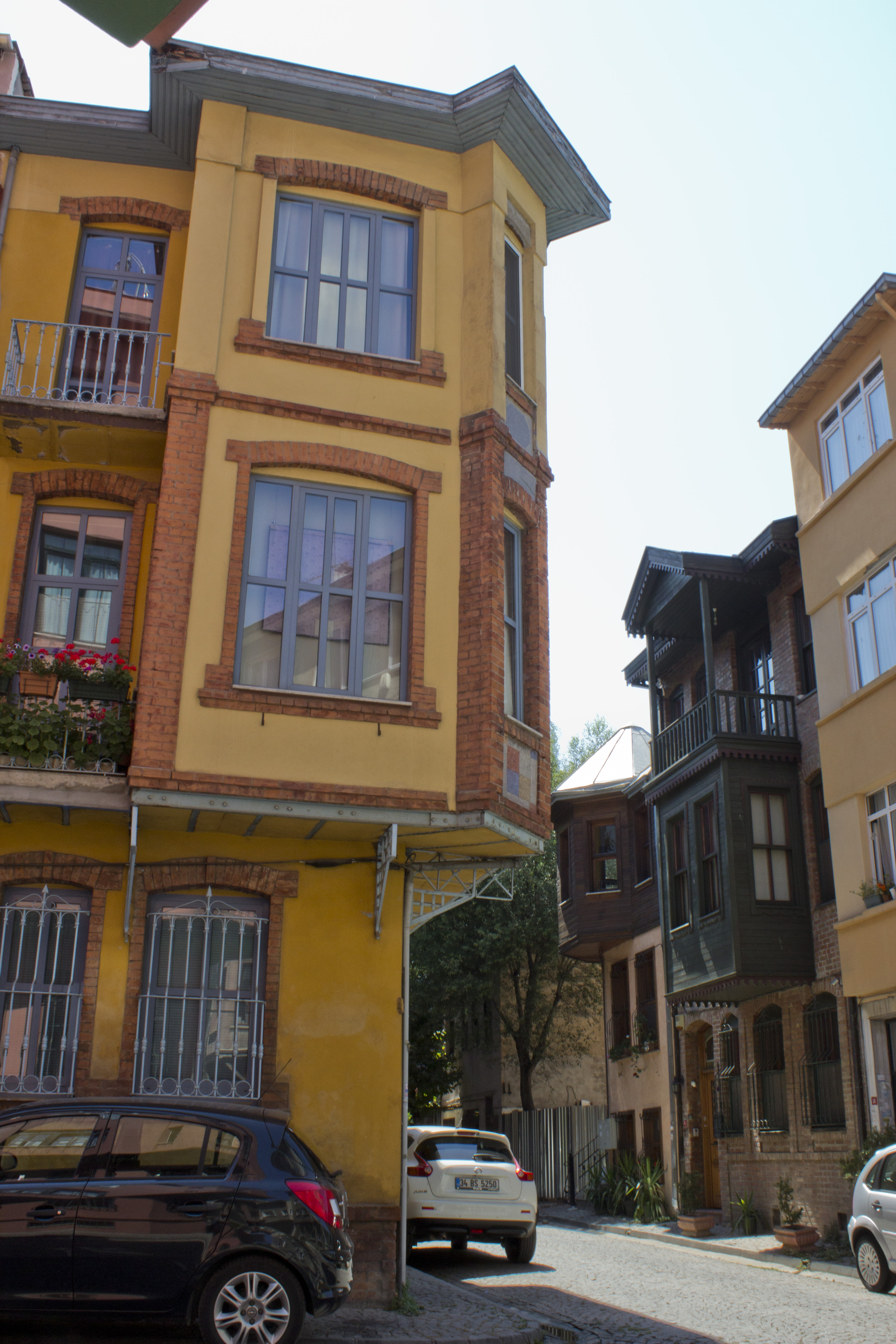
Kuzguncuk streets

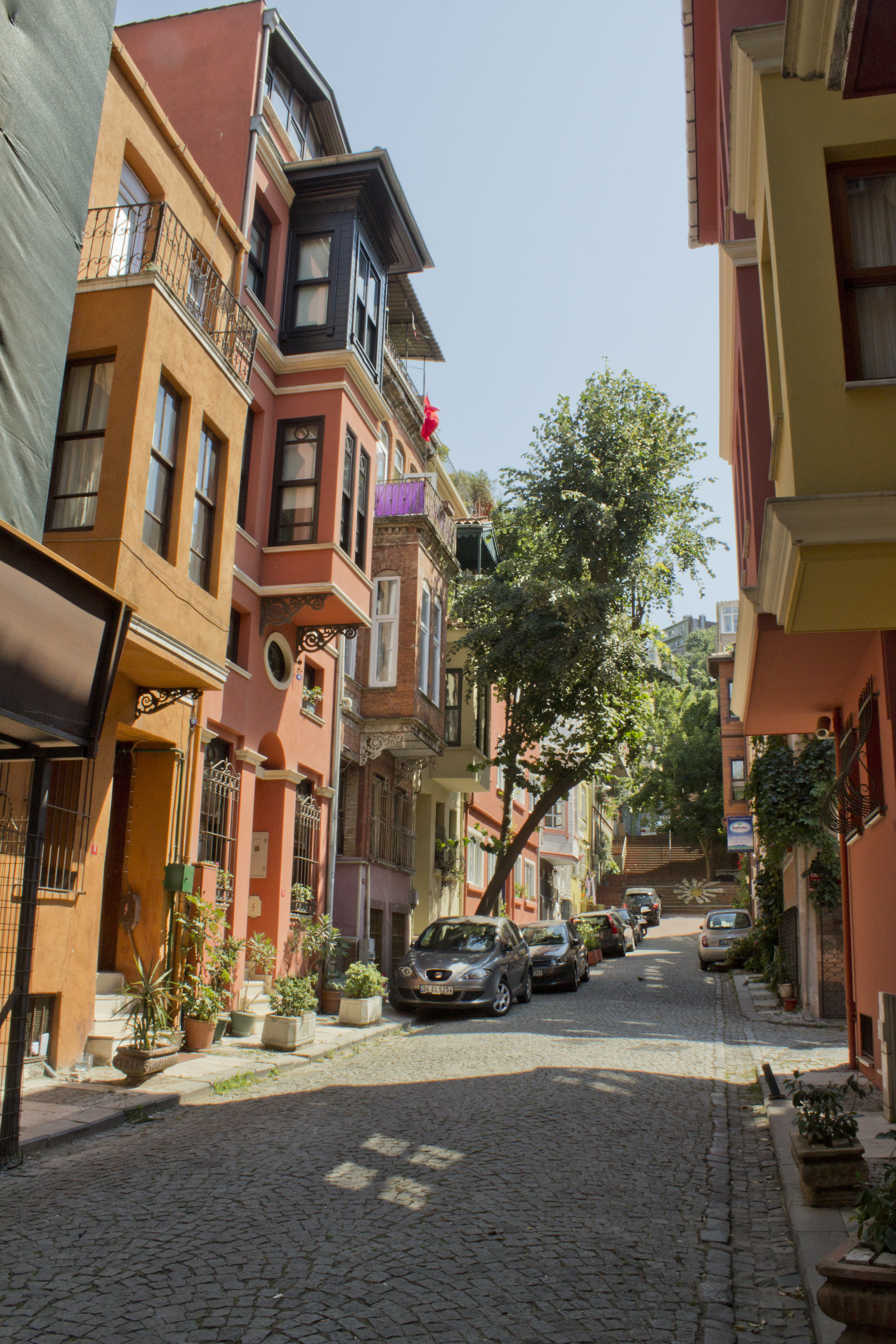
Kuzguncuk streets

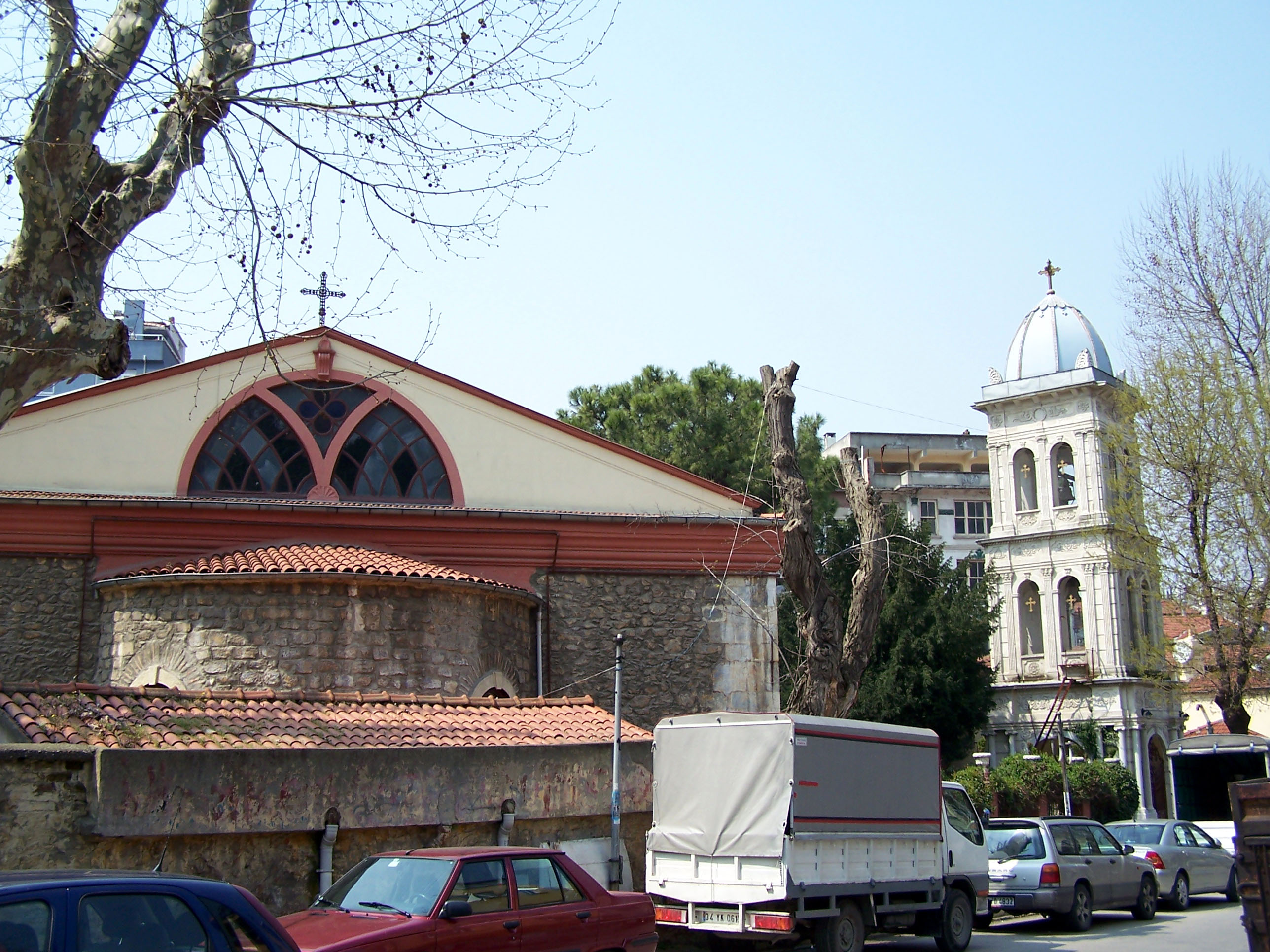
Agios Panteleimonas Greek Orthodox Church in Kuzguncuk

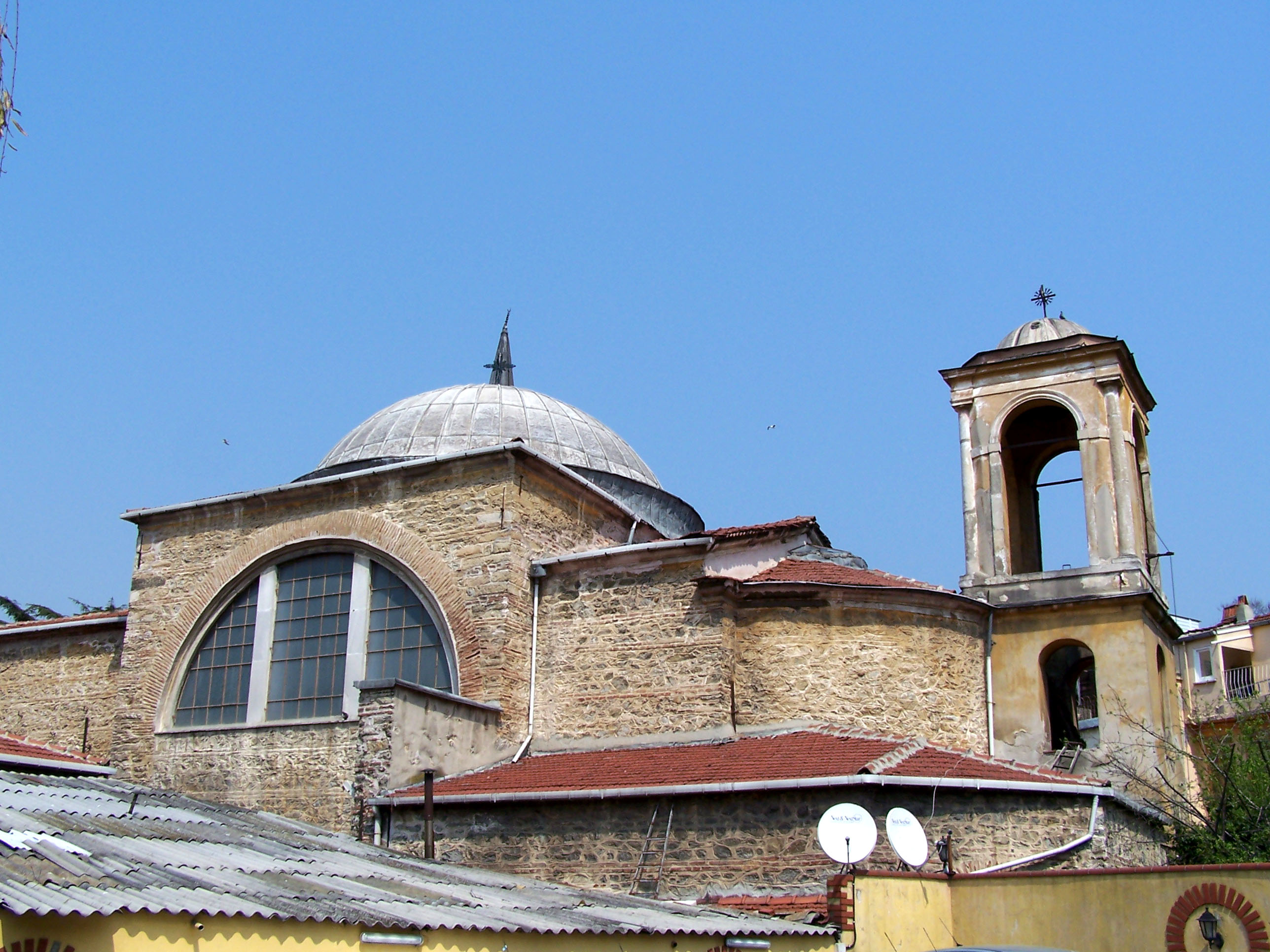
Surp Krikor Lusavoriç Armenian Church in Kuzguncuk.

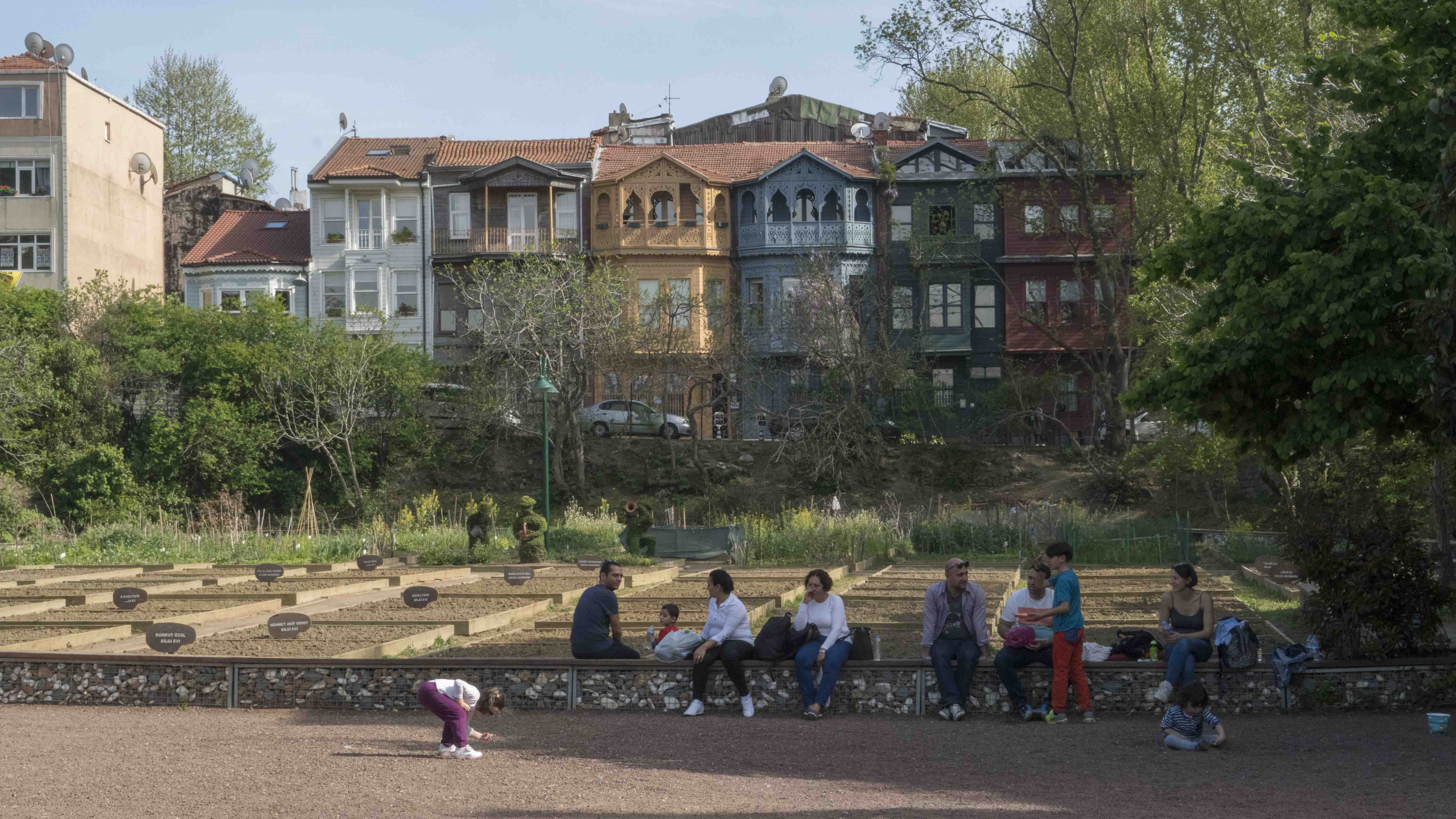
Kuzguncuk community garden

The word kuzguncuk means "little raven" or "barred window of a prison door" in Turkish. The name is said to have come from a holy person named Kuzgun Baba, who lived in the area during the time of Sultan Mehmet II or from the corruption of a previous name, Kozinitza.

During Byzantine times, this area may have been called Khrysokeramos (Hrisokeramos), meaning "golden tile", because of a church here with a gilded roof. Around 553, Narses had a church built here dedicated to the Virgin Mary.

Jews, who were expelled from Spain and Portugal and accepted into the Ottoman Empire in the late 15th century were among the settlers in the neighbourhood. As voluntary immigrants, they had more freedom concerning their place of residence, and many left the traditional Jewish quarters of Istanbul such as Balat for villages along the Bosphorus such as Kuzguncuk. The earliest evidence of Jewish presence in the neighborhood is a tombstone dated 1562.

Armenians began settling in Kuzguncuk in the 18th century and had become a sizable group by the 19th century. Ottoman records show an 1834 request that their nighttime religious services be allowed to continue without interference. In 1835, their first church was built.

After the establishment of Israel, the Jewish population, once sizable in Kuzguncuk, decreased rapidly.

The pogrom of 1955 caused the emigration of many members of Istanbul's minority groups, including Kuzguncuk's Greeks and Armenians. There are very few non-Muslims left today. This exodus opened up housing to migrants from Anatolia, changing the ethnic composition of Istanbul's neighborhoods. Most of the new residents of Kuzguncuk came from the Black Sea Region. By the end of the 20th century, 15% of neighborhood residents were from İnebolu, 15% from Rize, 10% from Trabzon, 10% from Tokat, 10% from Kars, and 10% from Sivas.

== Religious sites ==
There are currently two synagogues in Kuzguncuk: Bet Yaakov Synagogue (built 1878) and Bet Nissim Synagogue (built in the 1840s). The Nakkaştepe Jewish Cemetery is also in Kuzguncuk.

Churches of Kuzguncuk include Surp Krikor Lusavoriç (Saint Gregory the Illuminator) Armenian Church (first built 1835, rebuilt 1861), Ayios Yeorgios (Saint George) Greek Orthodox Church, Ayios Panteleimon (Saint Pantaleon) Greek Orthodox Church, and Ayios Ioannis (Saint John) Greek Orthodox Sanctuary (an Ayazma or holy spring).

There was no mosque in the center of the neighborhood until 1952, when the Kuzguncuk Mosque was built in the courtyard of the Armenian church (with building funds that included donations from the Armenian congregation). The Üryanizade Mosque along the shore on the northern edge of the neighborhood was built as a Mescit (small mosque) in 1860.

== Film set ==
The place with its historical mansions, churches, synagogues and mosques, cobblestone paved streets, plane trees and vegetable gardens, attracts film makers as a natural film set. Since the shooting of the popular TV comedy series Perihan Abla in the mid-1980s, Kuzguncuk became a favorite film set for several other TV series and commercials. The residents, however, are not pleased with the continuous discomfort caused by the shootings day and night.

== Notable people ==
- Mehmet Ali Aybar (1908–1995), leader of the banned Workers Party of Turkey (TİP)
- Refika Birgül (born 1980), food writer and television presenter
- Hülya Koçyiğit (born 1947), movie actress
- Palaiologos, Pavlos (1895–1984), journalist, writer
- Oktay Rıfat Horozcu (1914–1988), writer, playwright and poet
- Nihat Sargın, secretary general of the banned Workers Party of Turkey (TİP)
- Can Yücel (1926–1999), poet
- Uğur Yücel (born 1957), actor, film director and producer

== See also ==
- Aliyah

== Sources ==
- Ayverdi, Sâmiha (2002). Boğaziçiʼnde Târih (History on the Bosphorus) (5 ed.). Kubbealti. ISBN 978-975-7663-88-1.
- Ecumenical Patriarchate. Church of Saint Panteleimon Kouzkountzoukiou. Retrieved 14 September 2009.
- Ecumenical Patriarchate. Holy Metropolises in Turkey. http://www.ec-patr.org/patrdisplay.php?lang=en&id=4 Retrieved 14 September 2009.
- Ercan, Şerif. (2004, 13 November) "Kuzguncuk Semttir Set Değil" (Kuzguncuk is a neighborhood, not a film set). Sabah (newspaper). http://arsiv.sabah.com.tr/2004/11/13/cpsabah/gnc105-20041030-101.html Retrieved 12 September 2009.
- Eyice, Semavi (1976). Bizans Devrinde Boğaziçi (The Bosphorus in the Byzantine era). İstanbul Üniversitesi Edebiyat Fakültesi.
- Houston, Christopher (2001). Islam, Kurds and the Turkish Nation State. Berg. ISBN 978-1-85973-477-3.
- Hürel, Haldun (2008). Semtleri, Mahalleri, Caddeleri ve Sokakları A'dan Z'ye İstanbul'un Alfabetik Öyküsü (The alphabetic story of Istanbul). İkarus. ISBN 978-975-999-290-3.
- Internet Movie Database. Aci Hayat. https://www.imdb.com/title/tt0499168/ Retrieved 12 September 2009.
- Rozen, Minna (2002). A History of the Jewish community in Istanbul: The Formative Years, 1453-1566. Brill. ISBN 978-90-04-12530-8.
- Tabakoğlu, Ahmet. (2007, 1–5 November). Osmanlı Döneminde Üsküdar Köyleri (Üsküdar villages in the Ottoman period). Paper presented at Üsküdar Sempozyumu V. https://web.archive.org/web/20111006122806/http://www.uskudar.bel.tr/portal/doc/sempozyum/sempozyum5/T11.pdf Retrieved 19 September 2009.
- Tuğlacı, Pars (1991). İstanbul Ermeni Kiliseleri = Armenian Churches of Istanbul = Istʻanpuli Hayotsʻ ekeghetsʻinerě. Pars. ISBN 975-7423-00-9.
- Türkiye Hahambaşılığı (Chief Rabbinate of Turkey). (2005) Synagogues: Asian Side of the Bosphorus. https://web.archive.org/web/20110714133716/http://www.musevicemaati.com/index.php?contentId=27 Retrieved 14 August 2009.
- Üsküdar Belediyesi (Üsküdar Municipality). Cemil Molla Köşkü (Mullah Cemil pavilion). https://web.archive.org/web/20110722000709/http://www.uskudar-bld.gov.tr/portal/rehber_/t1.jsp?PageName=rehberAyrinti&ID=772 Retrieved 20 September 2009.
- Üsküdar Belediyesi (Üsküdar Municipality). Kuzguncuk Mahallesi (Kuzguncuk neighborhood). https://web.archive.org/web/20111006122541/http://www.uskudar.bel.tr/portal/uskudar_/t1.jsp?PageName=mahalletarihceAyr&ID=26 Retrieved 12 September 2009.
