= Burhaniye, Üsküdar =

Turkish locality

Burhaniye
- Neighbourhood
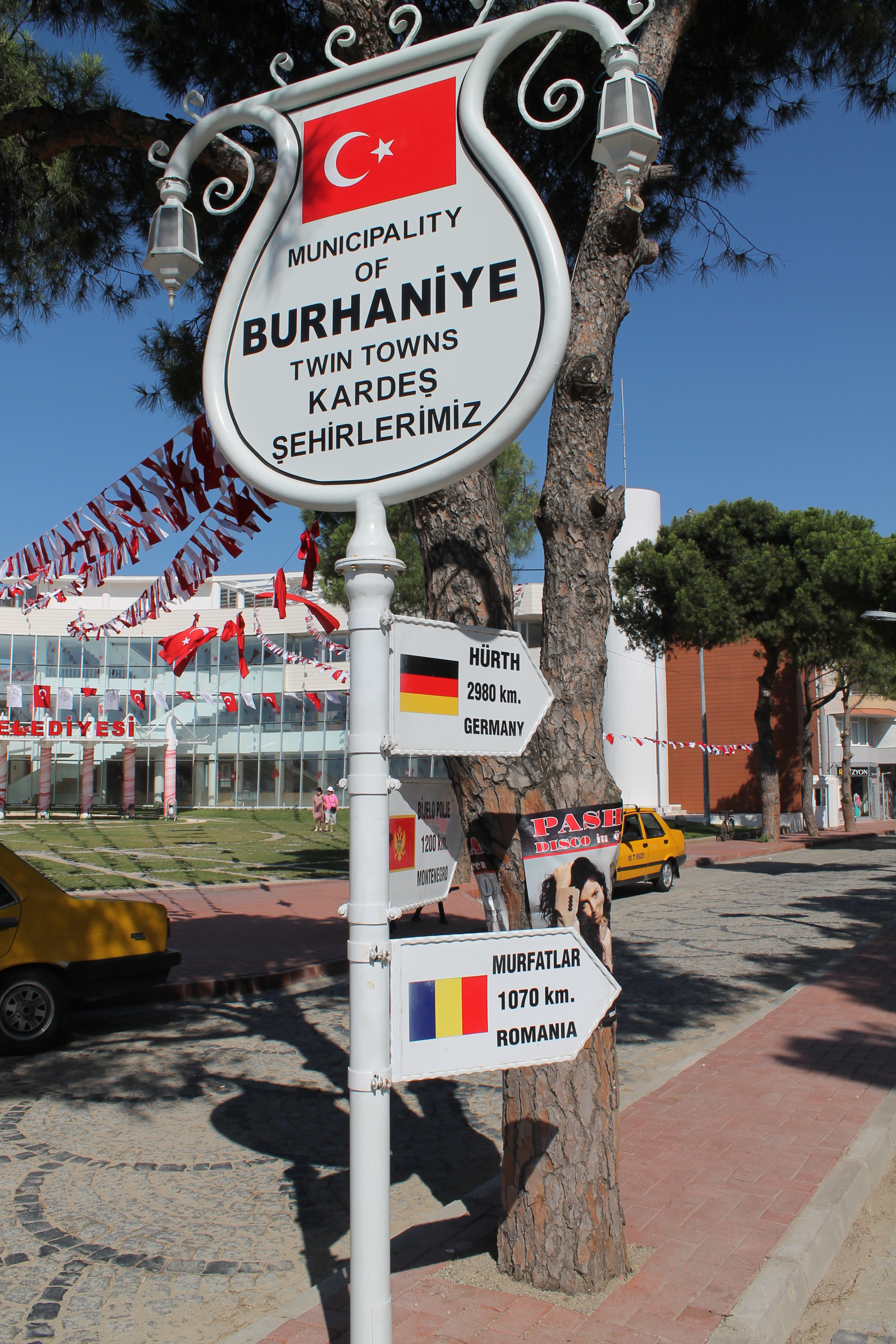

- Location within Turkey Location within Istanbul
- Coordinates: 41.0283°N 29.0534°E
- Country: Turkey
- Province: Istanbul
- District: Üsküdar
- Population (2022): 16,438
- Time zone: UTC+3 (TRT)

Burhaniye is a neighborhood in the municipality and district of Üsküdar, Istanbul Province, Turkey. Its population is 16,438 (2022). It is on the Asian side of Istanbul. Burhaniye is mostly a residential neighborhood, with few historic houses and buildings. It is bordered on the north by Beylerbeyi and Küplüce, on the east by Kısıklı, on the south by Küçükçamlıca, and on the west by Altunizade and Kuzguncuk. The Otoyol 1 highway runs along the western border of the neighborhood.

The neighborhood was settled by refugees from the 1876 April Uprising in Bulgaria and was first known as Muhacir Köyü (Refugee Village). The neighborhood takes its present name from the Burhaniye Mosque, built in 1902 by Sultan Abdul Hamid II for his son Burhanettin Efendi.

In addition to the Burhaniye Mosque, mosques in the neighborhood include Oğuzhan Mosque, Akabe Mosque, and Polis Evleri Mosque.

Schools in the neighborhood include Burhaniye Elementary School, Nursen Fuat Özdayı Elementary School, and the Beylerbeyi Campus of SEV Private Elementary School.

Other important neighborhood institutions include the Çamlıca German Hospital.
