= Sultantepe, Üsküdar =

Neighbourhood in Istanbul, Turkey

Sultantepe
- Neighbourhood
- Typical view of Sultantepe: apartment building rooftops and minaret of Bâkî Efendi Mosque.

- Location within Turkey Location within Istanbul
- Coordinates: 41°01′41″N 29°01′16″E
- Country: Turkey
- Province: Istanbul
- District: Üsküdar
- Population (2022): 10,874
- Time zone: UTC+3 (TRT)

Sultantepe is one of the 33 neighbourhoods in the municipality and district of Üsküdar, Istanbul Province, Turkey. Its population is 10,874 (2022). It is on the Asian side of Istanbul. The name Sultantepe means "sultan hill."

The traditional Sultantepe neighborhood is centered on a public square at the top of a hill overlooking the historic center of Üsküdar. Because of governmental reorganization, the present official neighborhood now includes the traditional neighborhood on the hilltop and hillsides in addition to almost all of the former Hacı Hesna Hatun neighborhood, parts of the former Selmanağa neighborhood, and parts of the İcadiye and Kuzguncuk neighborhoods.

During Byzantine times, there was a building with marble columns, possibly a church, on the hilltop.

During Ottoman times, according to one source, the neighborhood was selected as a residence by a woman in Suleiman the Magnificent's court, Hacı Hesna Hatun (Lady Hesna the Hajji), the nursemaid of his daughter Mihrimah Sultan. As Mihrimah grew up and Hesna prepared for retirement, Hesna asked Mihrimah for a site from which she could watch the sultan and his palace. Mihrimah gave her the land that is now Sultantepe and had a residence built for her there. According to another source, Mihrimah had tuberculosis and her doctors sent her to Sultantepe for the healthier air. Hesna accompanied her and had a mosque built there.

Sultantepe is mostly a residential neighborhood. Retail businesses are concentrated along Selmani Pak Avenue on the southern edge of the neighborhood and around the square on top of the hill.

Schools in the neighborhood include Sultantepe Elementary School, Halide Edip Adıvar High School, and Üsküdar Commerce High School. A school was founded in the Sultantepe house of Turkish novelist and educator Halide Edib Adıvar in 1925 and again in 1937; the house, however, collapsed in 1939. The present Sultantepe Elementary was built on its site.

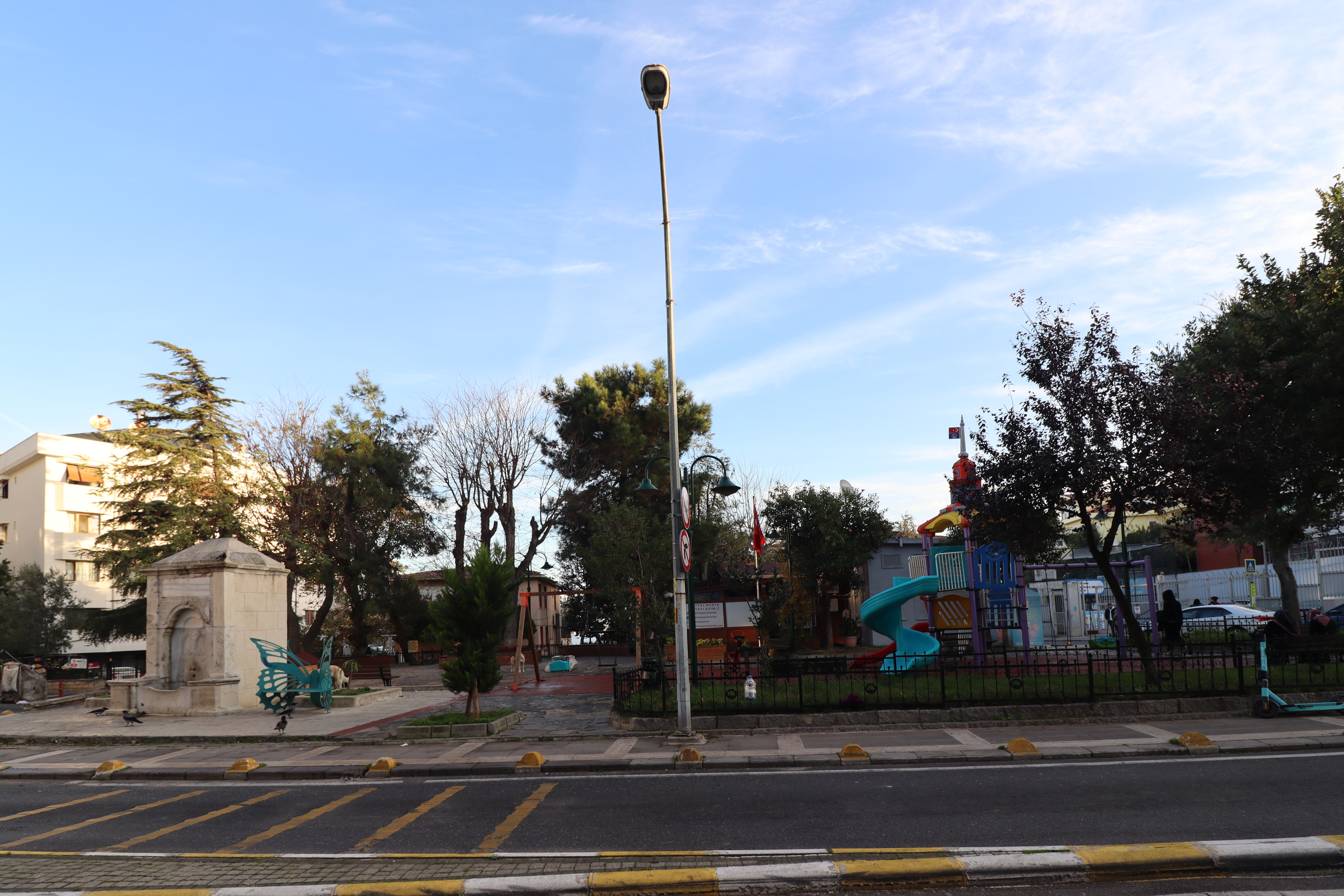
Sultantepe park

Mosques in the neighborhood include Hacı Hesna Hatun (first built 16th century, rebuilt 1900, repaired 1957), Bâkî Efendi (built 1644, repaired 1875), and Mirzâzâde (built 1730–1), around the top of the hill; Sheyh Mustafa Devati and Abdi Efendi, in the former Selmanağa neighborhood; and Abdurrahman Ağa (built 1766–7, rebuilt or repaired 1832–33, 1965, and 1995) in Paşalimanı.

One of the most important historical sites of the neighborhood is the Özbekler Tekkesi (Uzbeks' Dervish Lodge), first built in the 1750s for pilgrims from Central Asia, possibly on the place where such pilgrims traditionally pitched their tents. The tekke was run by the Naqshbandi order and was rebuilt in 1844. It played a role in the Turkish War of Independence as a refuge and meeting place for members of the resistance, communications center, hospital, and weapons depot. To the northeast of the lodge is the tekke's cemetery, which holds the graves of the tekke's shaykhs and others associated with the tekke. Among those buried there are Münir Ertegun, Nesuhi Ertegun, and Ahmet Ertegun. At the entrance to the cemetery is the tomb of Ali Rıza Efendi, about whom nothing is known except that he died at age 15.

The largest green space in the area is the Fethi Paşa Korusu (Fethi Pasha Grove), on the northeastern edge of the neighborhood.
