= Beylerbeyi Palace Tunnel =

Beylerbeyi Palace Tunnel Beylerbeyi Sarayı Tüneli
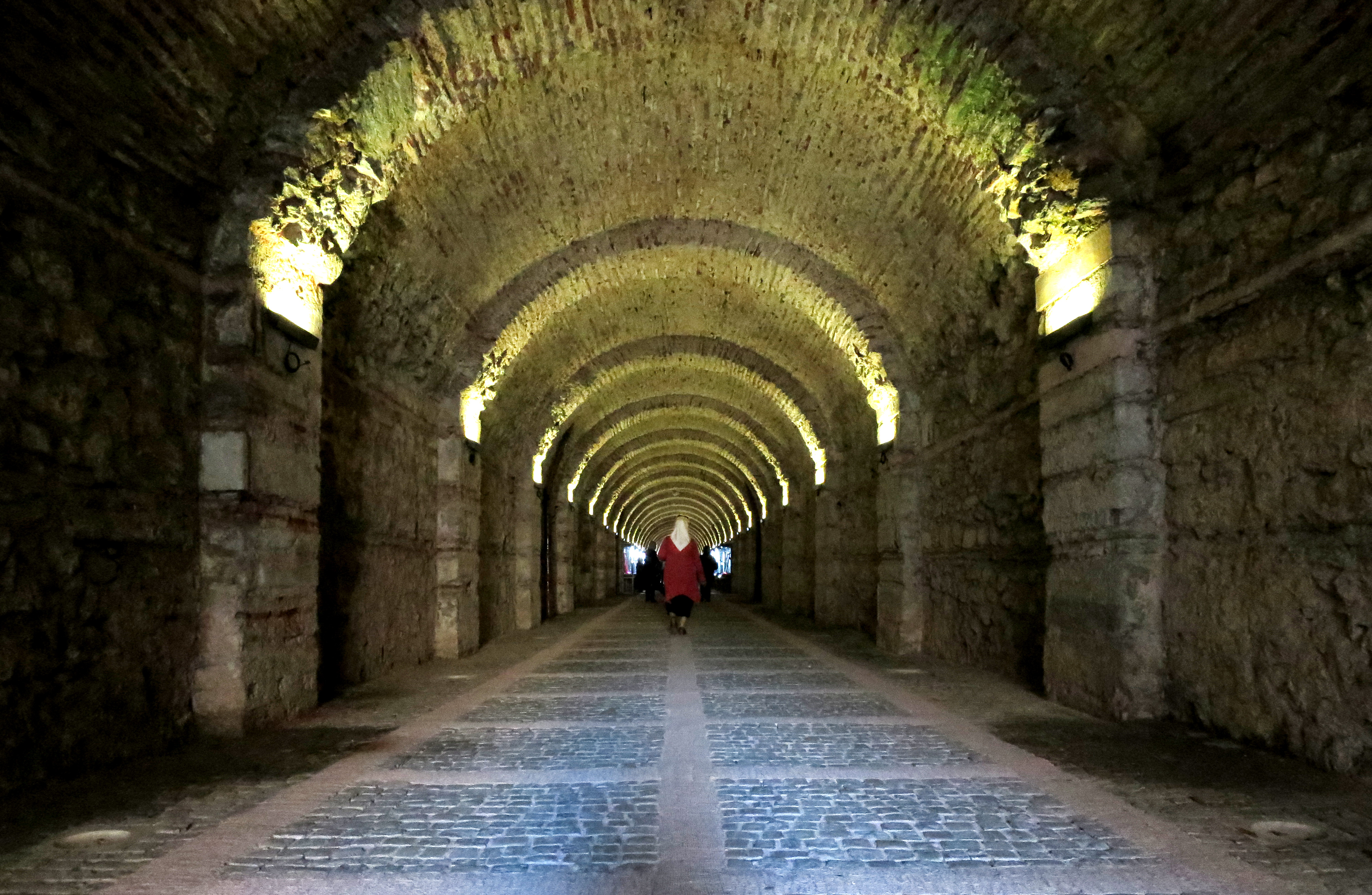
- Interactive map of Beylerbeyi Palace Tunnel; Beylerbeyi Sarayı Tüneli

Overview
- Location: Beylerbeyi Palace, Beylerbeyi, Üsküdar, Istanbul, Turkey
- Coordinates: 41°02′31″N 29°02′24″E

Operation
- Work began: 1829
- Opened: 1832; 194 years ago
- Traffic: automotive

Technical
- Length: 230 m (750 ft)
- Tunnel clearance: 2.90 m (9.5 ft)

Location of Beylerbeyi Palace Tunnel in Istanbul.

The Beylerbeyi Palace Tunnel (Turkish: Beylerbeyi Sarayı Tüneli) is a historic tunnel under the Beylerbeyi Palace in Beylerbeyi neighborhood of the Üsküdar district in Istanbul, Turkey connecting Üsküdar with Beylerbeyi and Çengelköy. It was built to separate the palace from the main road. Commissioned by Ottoman Sultan Mahmud II (reigned 1808–1839) in 1829 and completed in 1832, the tunnel is situated under a hill on the Asian side of the Bosphorus, which is today the terrace garden of the later-built Beylebeyi Palace.

The tunnel, which has 2.90 m (9.5 ft) clearance served as a transportation artery until the 1970s. It was used as museum and exhibition site after its closure.

On 19 September 2016 the tunnel re-opened to traffic in order to ease the traffic congestion on the coastal road in the area under the Bosphorus Bridge, and later shut down again to preserve the historic structure from damage caused by exhaust emissions.

The tunnel was built by Üsküdar Municipality after 40 years, Üsküdar - Beylerbeyi - Çengelköy line, which takes one and a half hours, has reduced the coastal journey to 15 minutes. Only small vehicles are allowed in the tunnel, vehicles such as buses and trucks are not allowed.
