= Badawi Tekke of Beylerbeyi =

Badawi Tekke of Beylerbeyi, a tekke in the Beylerbeyi neighborhood of Üsküdar, Istanbul, Turkey. It is known around as a soup kitchen, and continues to serve warm meals to the public. Regular zikirs are held by the Naqshbandi order at the dergah.

== History ==
Sent from his hometown of Bilecik to Istanbul by his guide Sheykh Mustafa Karadag, Haji Seyyid Huseyin Hifzi Bedevi (from the lineage of Sheykh Ahmad al-Badawi) guided philanthropist Ali Bey to build a three-floor building between 1854–1855. The tekke saw much neglect starting with the republican era of 1924 and lasting until the 1990s. It was formed into a kulliyye known as the Bedevi Dergahi through the leadership of the Huseyin Hifzi Foundation. Later, the foundation was appropriated to the Istanbul Education Foundation (İSTEV) which took upon the job of renovating the old building according to its original plan.
