= İcadiye =

Neighbourhood in Istanbul, Turkey

- Neighbourhood
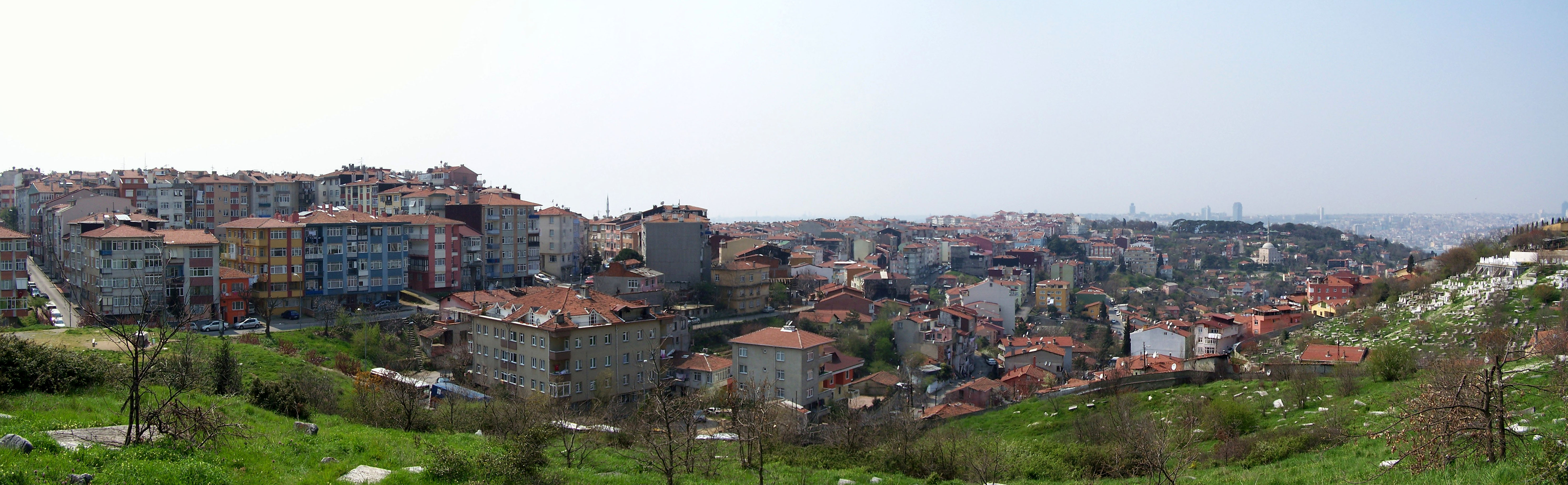
- View of İcadiye and Kuzguncuk neighborhoods

- Location within Turkey Location within Istanbul
- Coordinates: 41°01′37″N 29°02′02″E
- Country: Turkey
- Province: Istanbul
- District: Üsküdar
- Population (2022): 15,962
- Time zone: UTC+3 (TRT)

İcadiye is a neighbourhood in the municipality and district of Üsküdar, Istanbul Province, Turkey. Its population is 15,962 (2022). It is on the Asian side of Istanbul. It is centered on İcadiye Hill and is bordered on the north by Kuzguncuk, on the east by Altunizade, on the south by Selami Ali, and on the west by Sultantepe. It is mostly a residential neighborhood, with a few historic houses and buildings.

The name of the neighborhood is related to the word for invention (Turkish: icat). It received this name because new types of printing presses invented by Sarkis Kalfa of Kayseri were manufactured in shops there.

Several water sources on İcadiye Hill were connected to the historic center of Üsküdar during the Ottoman era. The Mihrimah Sultan Water Line was built in 1547 to bring water to the Mihrimah Sultan Mosque. The Arslan Agha Water Line was built in 1646 to bring water to fountains in Sultantepe and to the Abdi Efendi and Mihrimah Sultan Mosques.

The neighborhood has a historic bathhouse, the İcadiye Dağ Hamamı, built in 1854 by Sheikh ul-Islam Arif Hikmet Beyefendi.

Because of its strategic location, in the past the neighborhood was the site of two fire towers, Arapzade Tower and Ayarcıbaşı Tower.

Mosques in the neighborhood include the Hacı Mehmet Ali Öztürk Mosque (1990) and the Hacı Osmanoğlu Mosque.

Schools in the neighborhood include Nersesyan Yermonyan Armenian Private Kindergarten and Elementary School (as of the 2000-2001 school year, this school had no students), Fuat Baymur Elementary School, İcadiye Elementary School, and Üsküdar High School.
