= Bet Yaakov Synagogue =

Synagogue in Istanbul, Turkey

- Turkish: Bet Yaakov Sinagogu; Hebrew: קהל קדוש בית יעקב
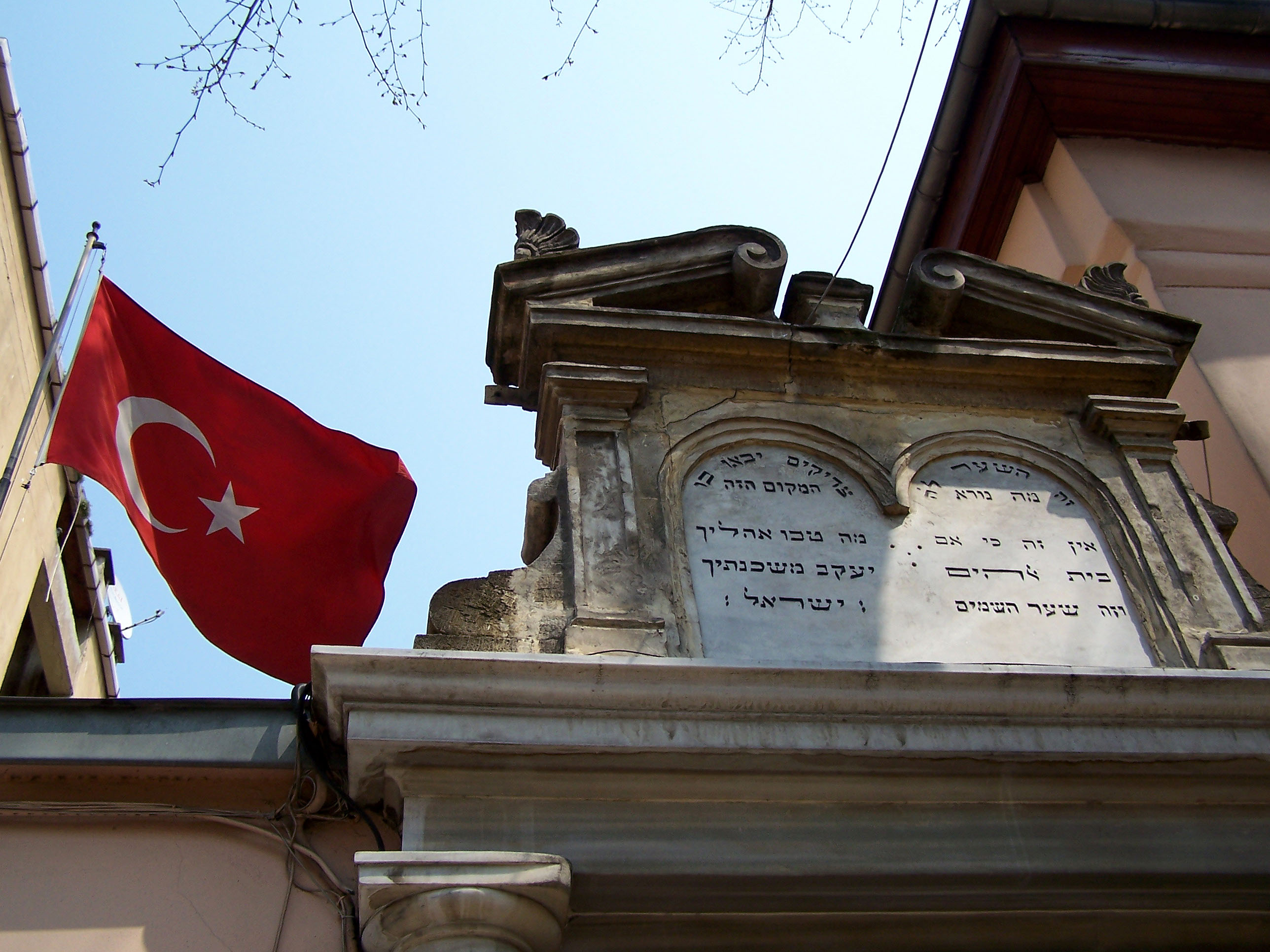
- The synagogue, in 2009

- Location of the synagogue in Istanbul

Religion
- Affiliation: Judaism
- Rite: Nusach Sefard
- Ecclesiastical or organizational status: Synagogue
- Status: Active

Location
- Location: Icadiye Street, Kuzguncuk, Istanbul, Istanbul Province
- Country: Turkey
- Interactive map of Bet Yaakov Synagogue
- Coordinates: 41°02′11″N 29°01′47″E

Architecture
- Type: Synagogue architecture
- Completed: 1878
- Materials: Brick

The Bet Yaakov Synagogue (Turkish: Bet Yaakov Sinagogu; Hebrew: קהל קדוש בית יעקב) is a Jewish congregation and synagogue, located on Icadiye Street, in Kuzguncuk, on the Asian side of the Bosphorus, in Istanbul, in the Istanbul Province of Turkey.

The commonly accepted construction date of the Kuzguncuk Synagogue is 1878. However, more recent research indicates that as early as 1862, the Ottoman Sultan granted permission for the synagogue's renovation. This suggests that the building may have been erected at an earlier date. The Jewish population of Kuzguncuk moved away in recent years, but the synagogue it is kept alive by worshippers whose families originated there. The synagogue is open, yet only open for Shabbat services.

== See also ==
- History of the Jews in Turkey
- List of synagogues in Turkey
