= Bet Nissim Synagogue =

Synagogue in Istanbul, Turkey

- Hebrew: קהל קדוש בית נסים
- Location of the synagogue in Istanbul

Religion
- Affiliation: Judaism
- Rite: Nusach Sefard (Eastern)
- Ecclesiastical or organisational status: Synagogue
- Status: Active

Location
- Location: Yakup Street, Kuzguncuk, Üsküdar, Istanbul, Istanbul Province
- Country: Turkey
- Coordinates: 41°02′00″N 29°01′54″E

Architecture
- Type: Synagogue architecture
- Completed: c. 1840; 1980 & 1997 (renovations)
- Materials: Brick

The Bet Nissim Synagogue (Hebrew: קהל קדוש בית נסים), also known as the Beit Nisim Synagogue, is a Jewish congregation and synagogue, located on Yakup Street, in Kuzguncuk, Üsküdar, Istanbul, in the Istanbul Province of Turkey. Completed in the late 19th century, visits to the synagogue are possible through appointment from the Chief Rabbinate. Its Ehal-ha-Kodesh dates from the end of 18th century.

== See also ==
- History of the Jews in Turkey
- List of synagogues in Turkey
