= Beylerbeyi Palace =

Ottoman palace in Istanbul, Turkey

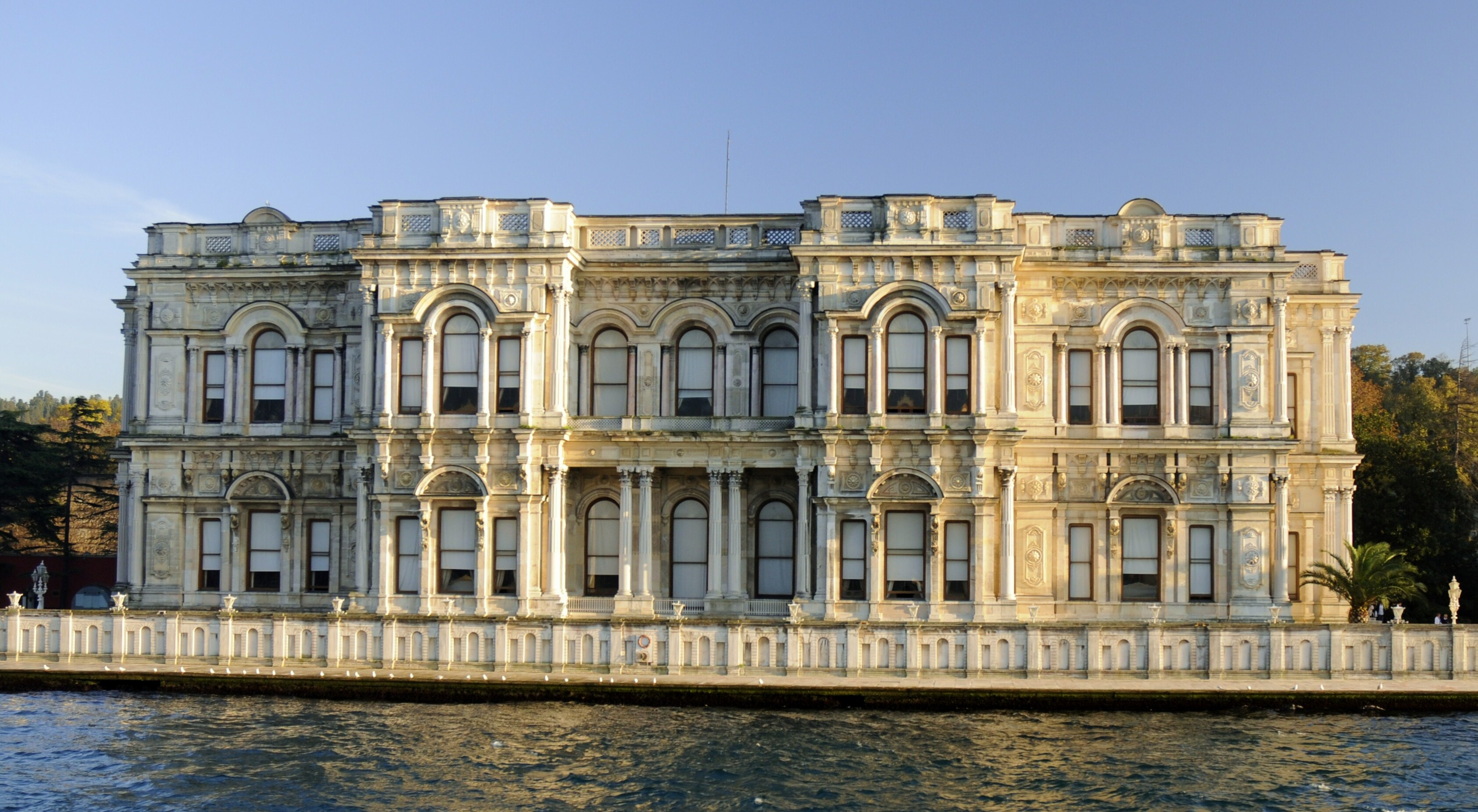
- A view of Beylerbeyi Palace from the Bosporus
- Interactive map of the Beylerbeyi Palace area

General information
- Architectural style: Ottoman, Second Empire
- Location: Istanbul, Turkey
- Coordinates: 41°02′33″N 29°02′24″E
- Construction started: 1861
- Client: Ottoman sultans
- Owner: Government of Turkey

Technical details
- Structural system: Main palace, pavilions and gardens

Design and construction
- Architects: Hagop Balyan, Sarkis Balyan

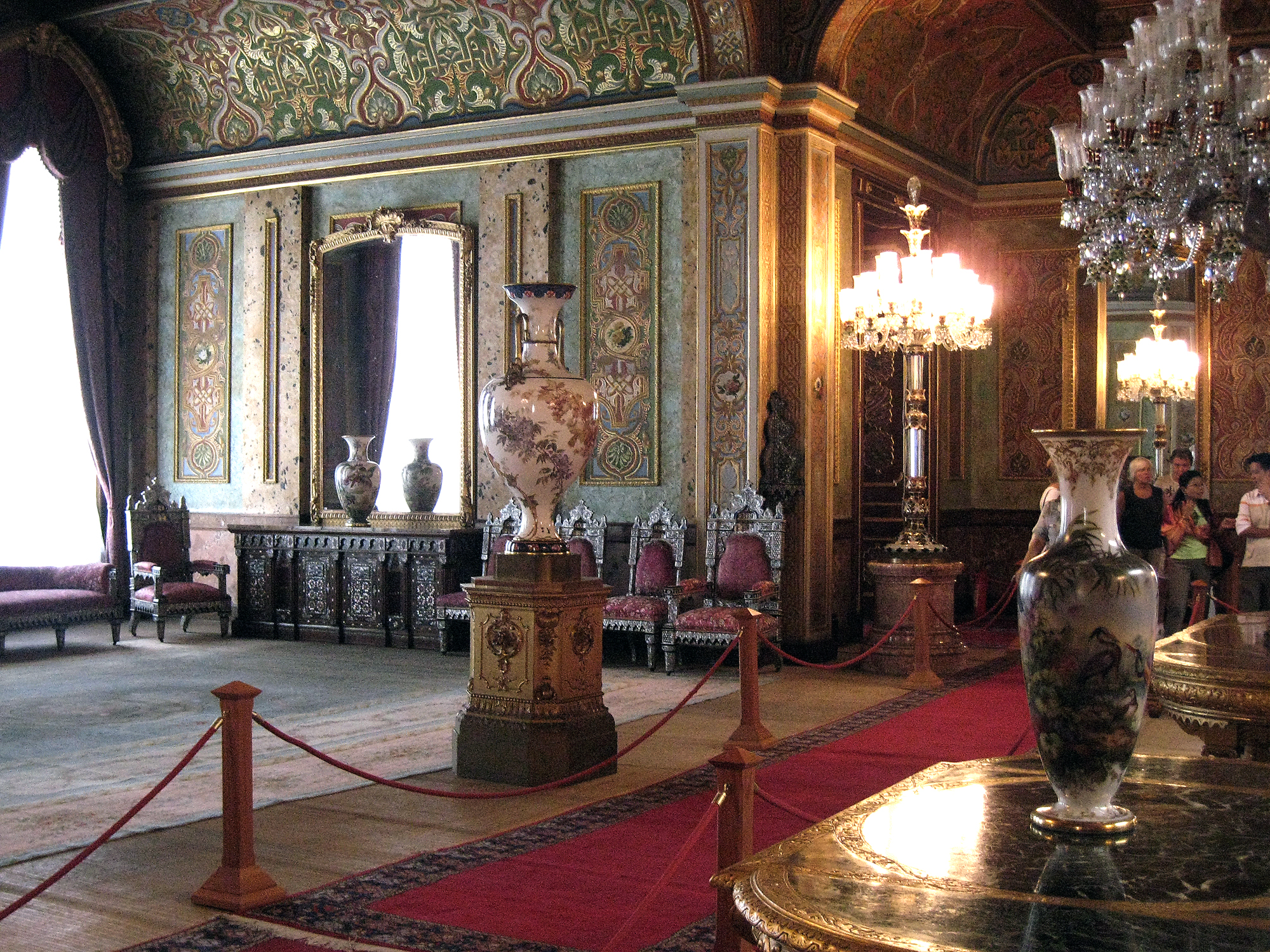
Beylerbeyi Palace interior

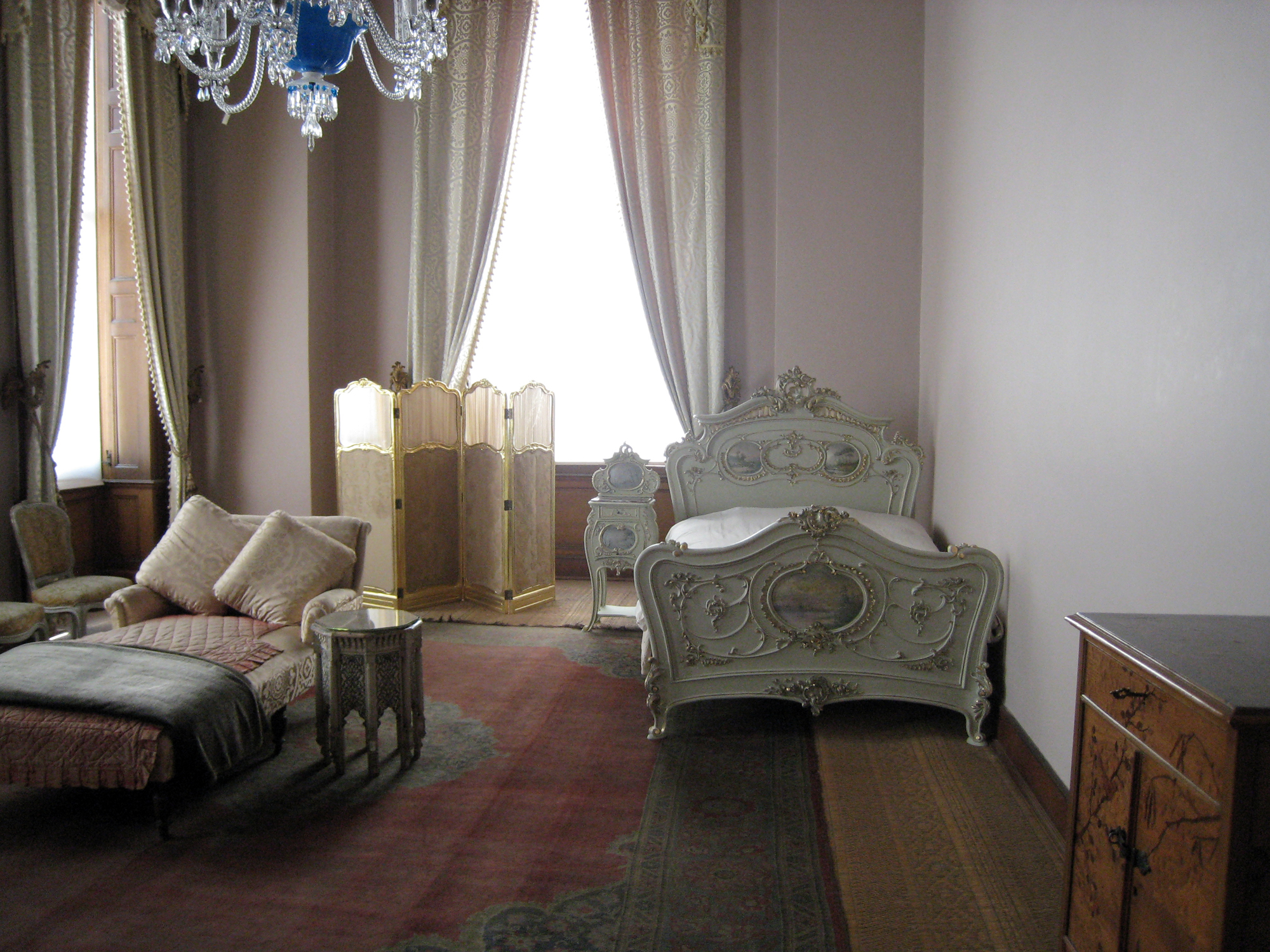
Sultan's bedroom

The Beylerbeyi Palace (Turkish: Beylerbeyi Sarayı) is a 19th-century Ottoman palace located in the Beylerbeyi neighborhood of Istanbul’s Üsküdar district, on the Asian shore of the Bosporus. Commissioned by Sultan Abdulaziz and completed between 1861 and 1865, the palace served as a summer residence and a place to host foreign dignitaries. Its design combines European architectural influences, particularly Neo-Baroque, with traditional Ottoman interior decoration. Today, it functions as a museum open to the public.

== History ==
Beylerbeyi Palace was commissioned by Sultan Abdülaziz (1830–1876) and constructed between 1861 and 1865 to serve as a summer residence and a venue for hosting visiting heads of state. Empress Eugénie of France visited Beylerbeyi on her way to the opening of the Suez Canal in 1869. Empress Eugénie of France was so delighted by the elegance of the palace that she had a copy of the window in the guest room made for her bedroom in Tuileries Palace, in Paris. The palace also welcomed other distinguished visitors such as the Duke Edward VII and Duchess Alexandra of Denmark.

In addition to its role as a summer retreat for Ottoman sultans, Beylerbeyi Palace functioned as an official state guesthouse. It hosted prominent figures including Franz Joseph, Emperor of Austria-Hungary (1869); Nicholas, King of Montenegro (1874); and Wilhelm II, German Emperor. After his dethronement, Sultan Abdülhamid II spent the last six years of his life at the palace, dying there in 1918.

== Description ==
Beylerbeyi Palace was designed by Sarkis Balyan in the Second Empire style. It is simpler in design compared to earlier palaces such as Dolmabahçe and Küçüksu. The palace is best seen from the Bosphorus, where two separate bathing pavilions can be seen: one for the harem (women’s quarters) and one for the selamlık (men’s quarters).

The palace’s interior design blends Western and Eastern influences and reflects features typical of traditional Turkish homes. This three-story building, including the basement, contains 24 rooms and 6 halls. The floors are covered with Egyptian straw mats. The rooms and halls are decorated with Turkish Hereke carpets, French Baccarat crystal chandeliers, and clocks made in Istanbul’s Haliç (Golden Horn) Dockyard from England, France, and Turkey. Additionally, porcelain vases from China, Japan, France, Germany, and Turkey’s Yıldız region add to the palace’s ornate decoration.

== See also ==
- Beylerbeyi Palace Tunnel
- Ottoman architecture

== Literature ==
- Hakan Gülsün. Beylerbeyi Palace. TBMM. Istanbul, 1993.

== Gallery ==
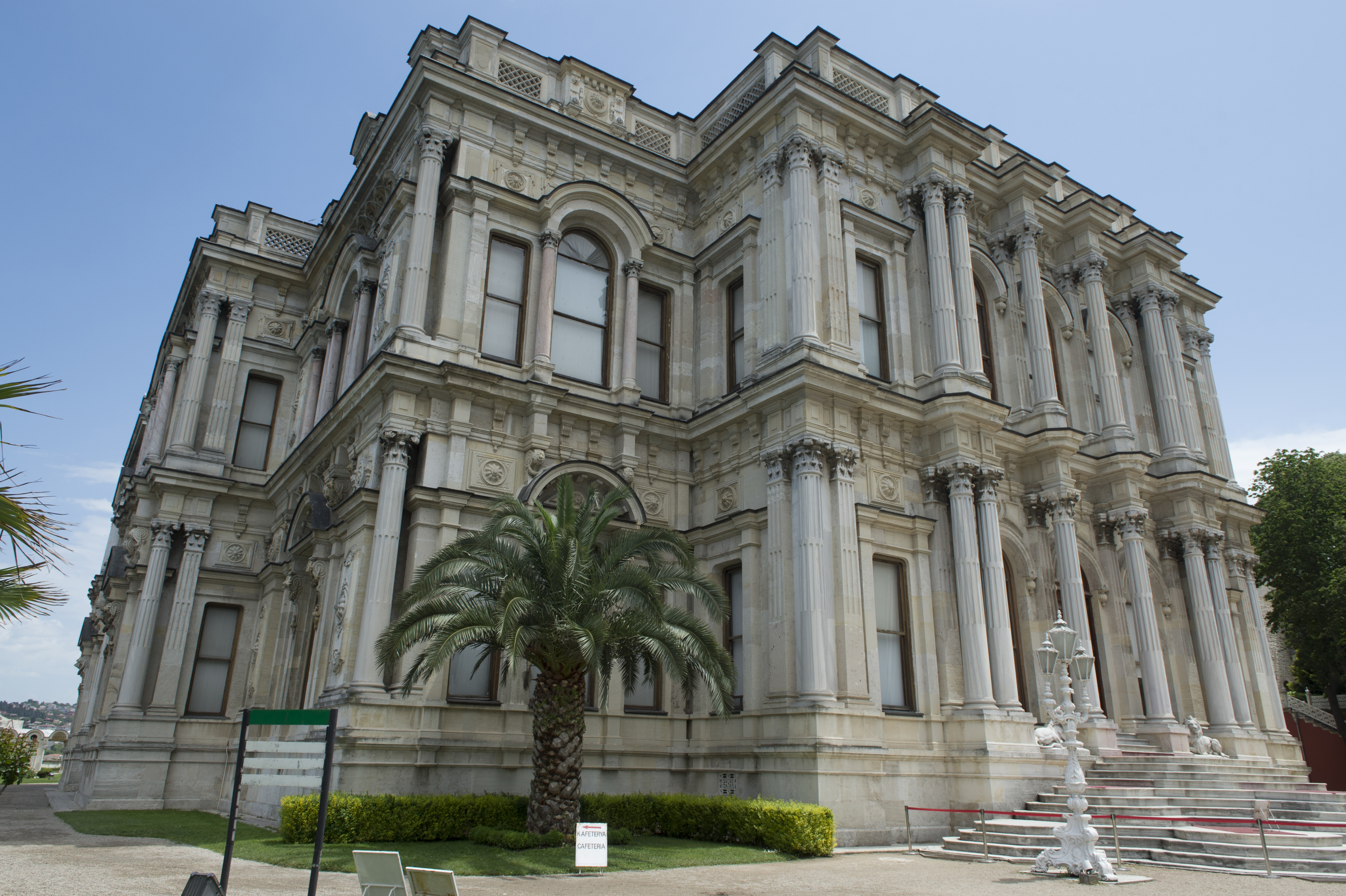
Beylerbeyi Palace Exterior view

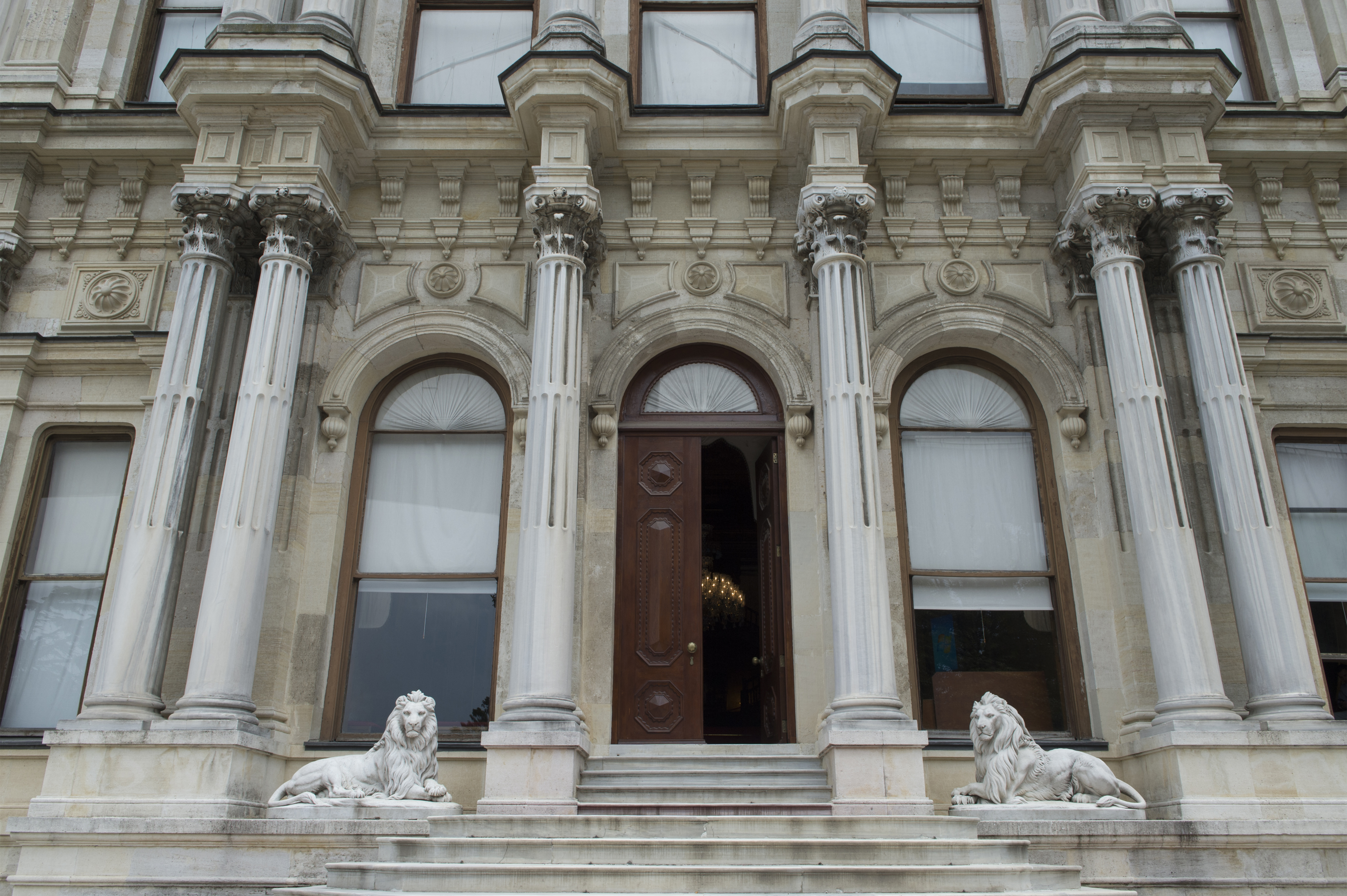
Beylerbeyi Palace Front with stairs

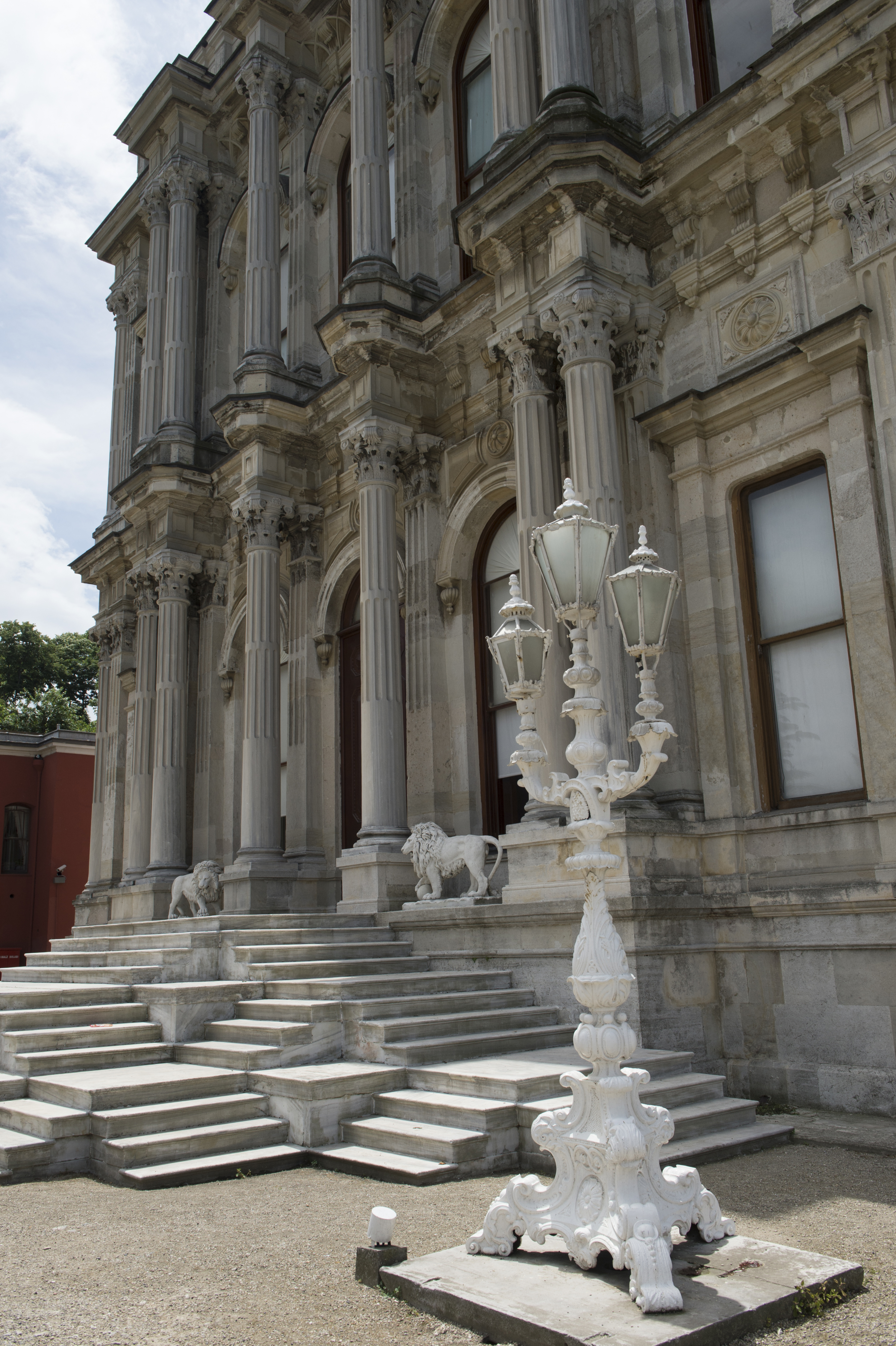
Beylerbeyi Palace Stairs from aside

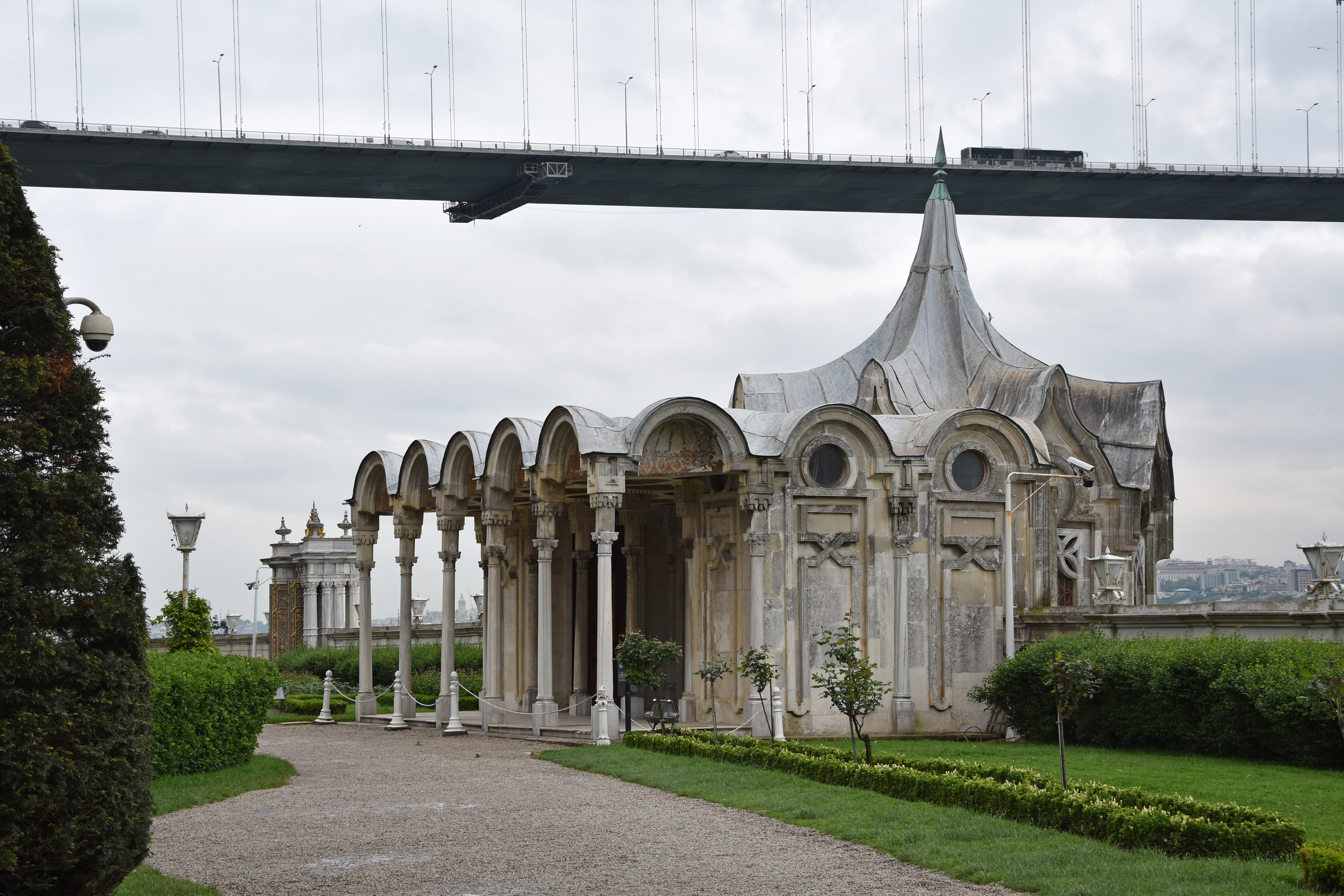
Beylerbeyi Palace Bathing pavilion

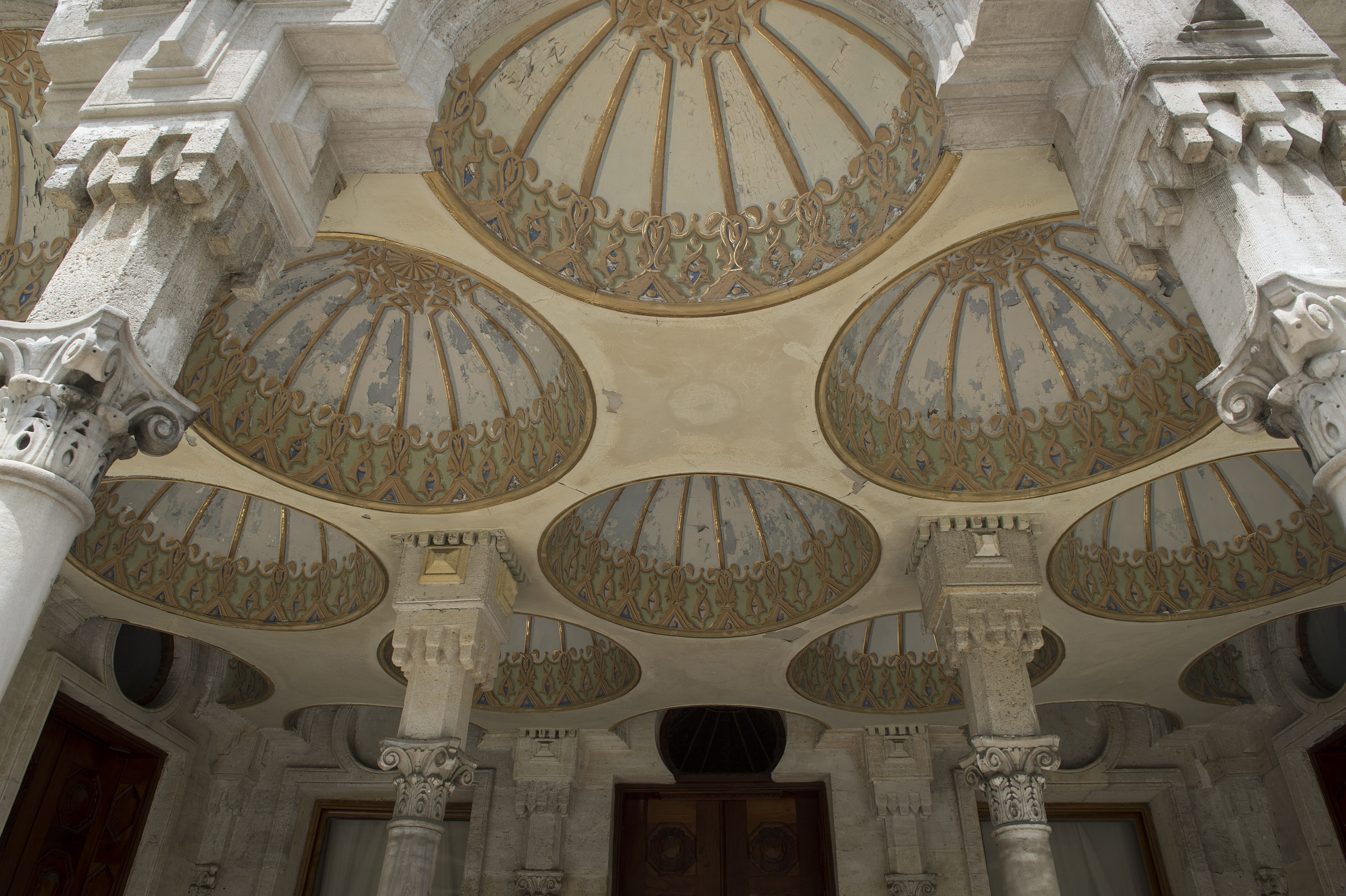
Beylerbeyi Palace Bathing pavilion
