= Agios Panteleimonas Greek Orthodox Church, Kuzguncuk =

Agios Panteleimonas Greek Orthodox Church
- Ἱερὸς Ναὸς Ἁγίου Παντελεήμονος Κουσγουντζουκίου; Aya Panteleimon Rum Ortodoks Kilisesi
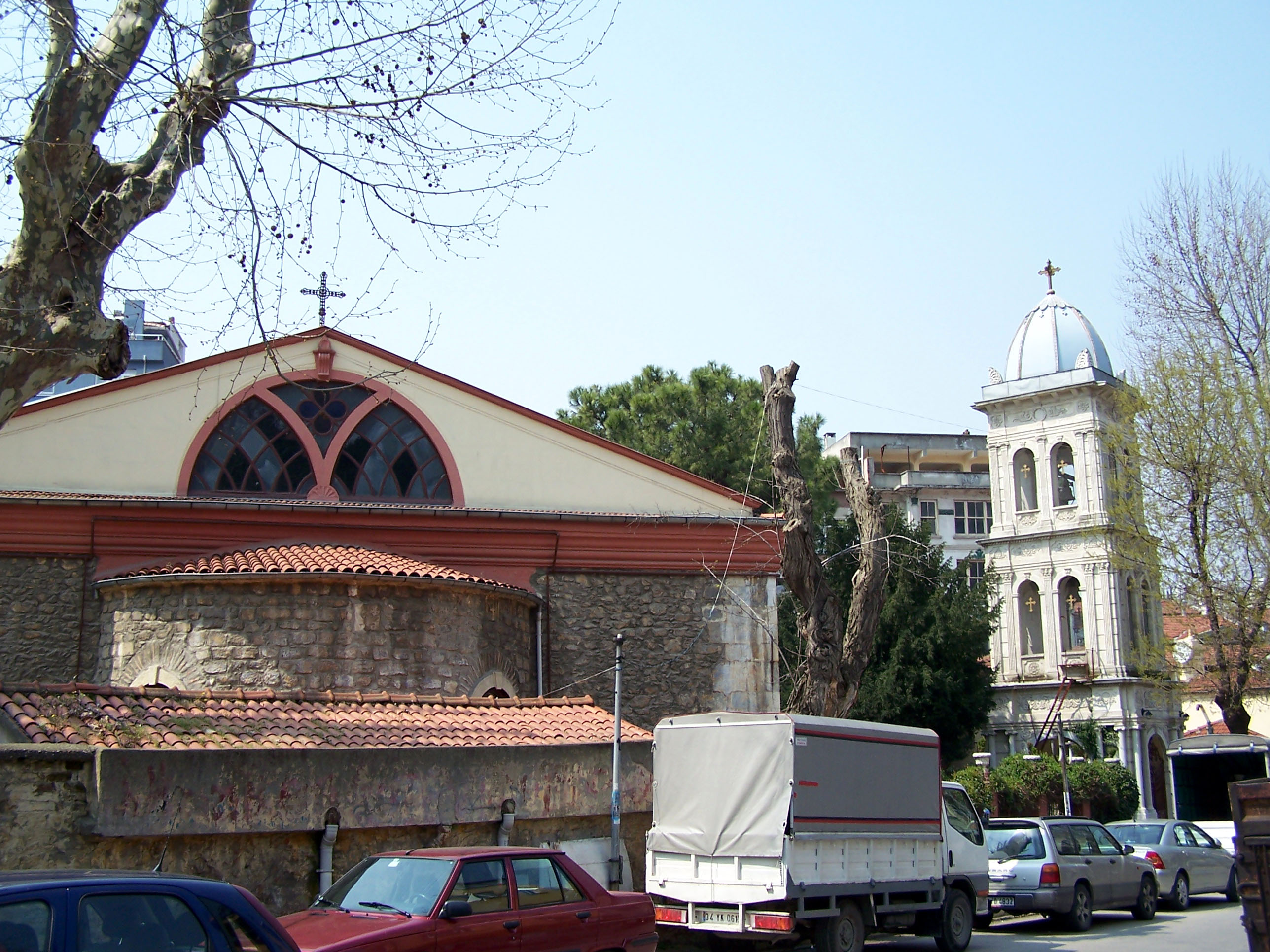
- Agios Panteleimonas Greek Orthodox Church and its belfry in Kuzguncuk, Istanbul.

- Location of the church in Istanbul.
- 41°02′04″N 29°01′49″E
- Location: Kuzguncuk, Istanbul
- Country: Turkey
- Denomination: Greek Orthodox

History
- Founded: 1892; 134 years ago
- Dedication: Saint Pantaleon

Agios Panteleimonas Greek Orthodox Church (Greek: Ἱερὸς Ναὸς Ἁγίου Παντελεήμονος Κουσγουντζουκίου, Turkish: Ayios Panteleimon Rum Ortodoks Kilisesi) is a Greek Orthodox church dedicated to Saint Pantaleon located in Kuzguncuk neighborhood of Üsküdar district in Istanbul, Turkey.

== History ==
The church was opened to worship during the reign of Ottoman Sultan Mahmud II (r. 1808–1839) in 1831. In 1872, the church building had a fire. Designed by architect Nikola Ziko, a new construction began in 1890. Two years later, the church reopened to service.

== Architecture ==
The church building is designed in Greek cross form of Byzantine architecture. The dome covering the central part of the building is carried by four pillars. The belfry, built by Andon Hüdaverdioğlu of Kuzguncuk in 1911, is situated over the marble courtyard entrance gate. Just on the street beside the church, a small square-plan holy well (Greek: ἁγίασμα, pr. hagiasma, Turkish: ayazma) is situated.

== See also ==
- Agios Georgios Greek Orthodox Church, Kuzguncuk
