= Agios Georgios Greek Orthodox Church, Kuzguncuk =

Agios Georgios Greek Orthodox Church
- Ἑλληνορθόδοξη Ἑκκλησία Αγίου Γεωργίου; Ayios Yeorgios Rum Ortodox Kilisesi
- Location of the church in Istanbul.
- 41°02′10″N 29°01′47″E
- Location: Kuzguncuk, Istanbul
- Country: Turkey
- Denomination: Greek Orthodox

History
- Dedication: Saint George

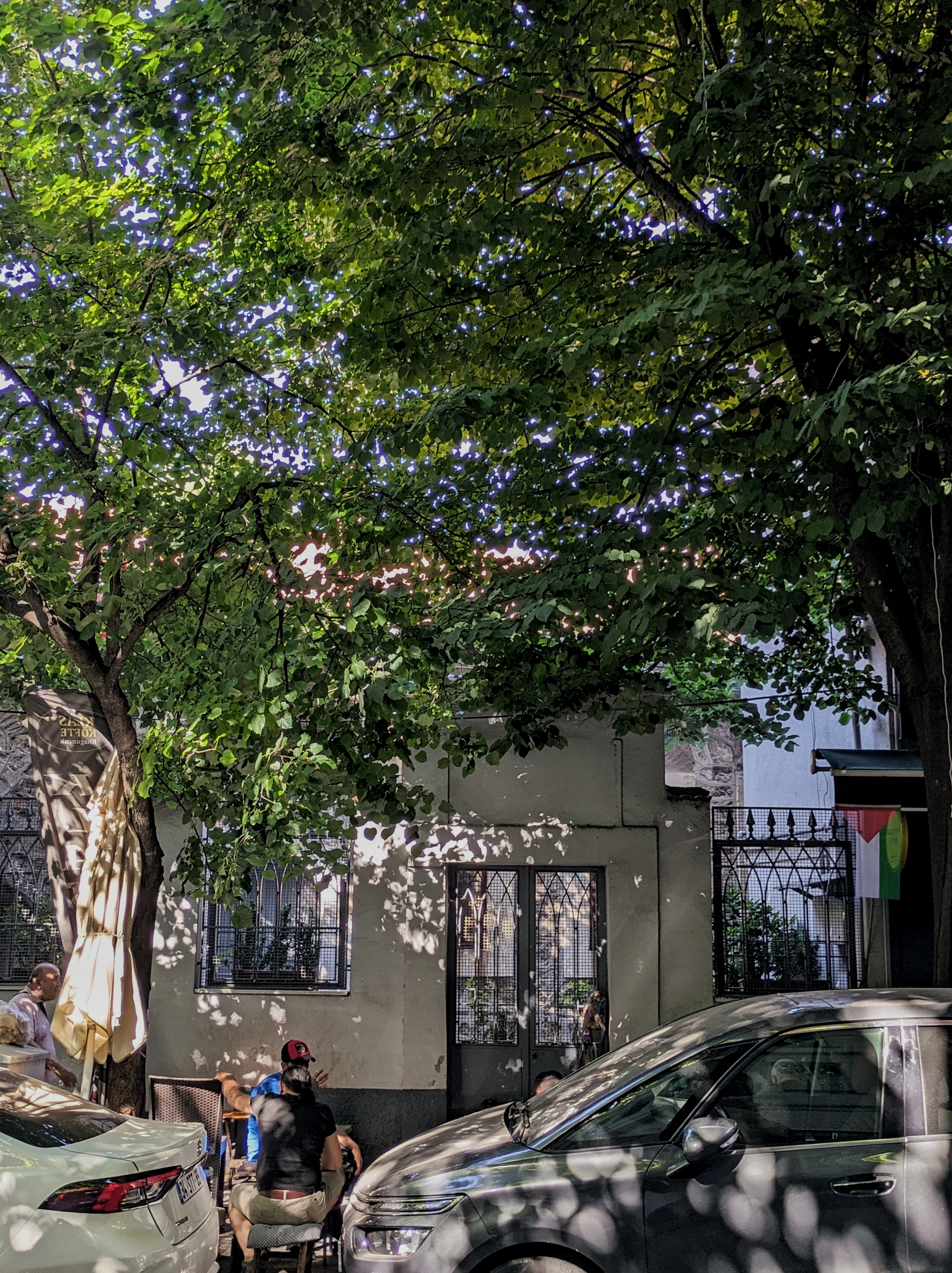
Church entrance

Agios Georgios Greek Orthodox Church (Greek: Ἑλληνορθόδοξη Ἑκκλησία Αγίου Γεωργίου, Turkish: Ayios Yeorgios Rum Ortodox Kilisesi) is a Greek Orthodox church dedicated to Saint George located in Kuzguncuk neighborhood of Üsküdar district in Istanbul, Turkey.

According to an inscription, the church underwent a complete renovation in 1821.

== See also ==
- Agios Panteleimonas Greek Orthodox Church, Kuzguncuk
