= Beylerbeyi =

- Neighbourhood
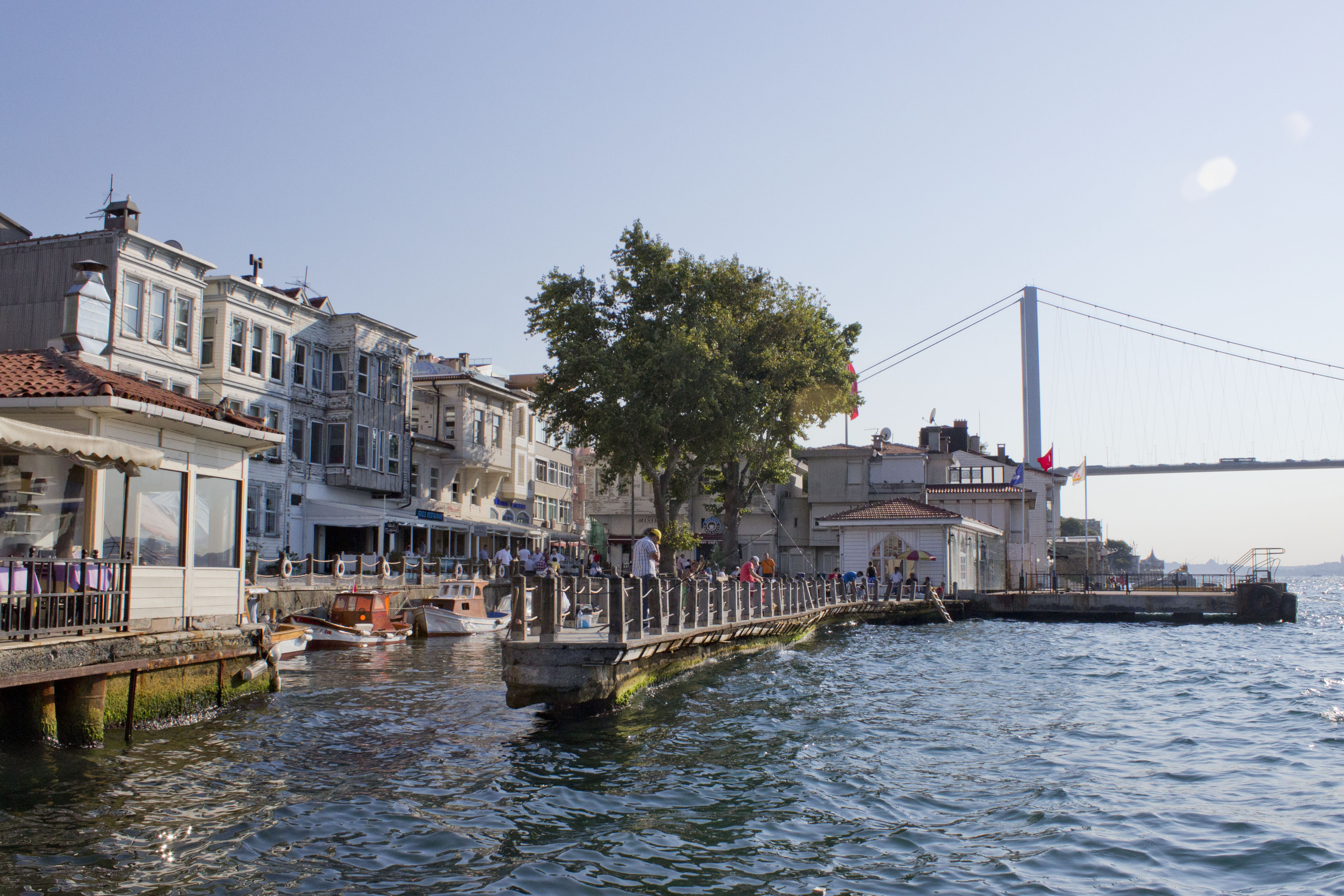
- Beylerbeyi Harbor with the Bosphorus Bridge in the background

- Location within Turkey Location within Istanbul
- Coordinates: 41°02′34″N 29°02′24″E
- Country: Turkey
- Province: Istanbul
- District: Üsküdar
- Population (2022): 5,168
- Time zone: UTC+3 (TRT)

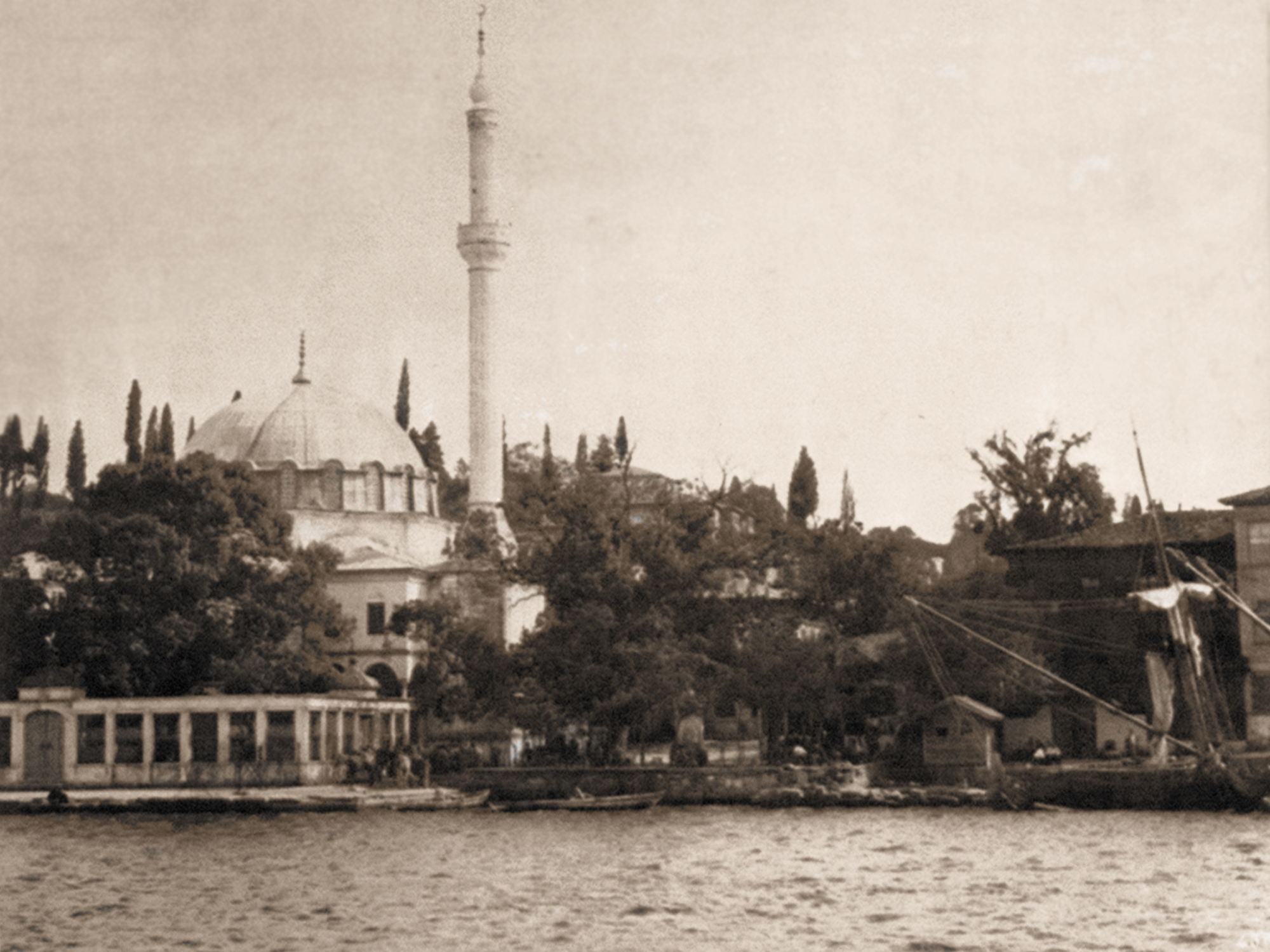
Hamid-i Evvel Mosque in the Beylerbeyi neighborhood (nineteenth-century view)

Beylerbeyi is a neighbourhood in the municipality and district of Üsküdar, Istanbul Province, Turkey. Its population is 5,168 (2022). It is located on the Asian shore of the Bosporus, to the north of the Bosphorus Bridge. It is bordered on the northeast by the neighborhood of Çengelköy, on the east by Kirazlıtepe, on the southeast by Küplüce, on the south by Burhaniye, on the southwest by Kuzguncuk, and on the northwest by the Bosporus. Directly across the Bosporus is the Ortaköy neighborhood of Istanbul's Beşiktaş municipality.

The main landmark of the neighborhood is the Ottoman Beylerbeyi Palace. Near the palace are various pavilions or kiosks (köşkler), including the two small seaside pavilions (Yalı Köşkleri), imperial stables (Ahır Köşkü), a "sunken" pavilion (Serdab Köşkü or Mermer Köşk), and a yellow pavilion (Sarı Köşk).

Another highly visible site within the neighborhood is the toll plaza on the Otoyol 1 highway for the Bosphorus Bridge.

Some of the wealthiest people in Turkey own homes in the Beylerbeyi neighborhood, including several members of the Sabancı family.

Schools in the neighborhood include the Naval Petty Officers Preparatory School (Deniz Astsubay Hazırlık Okulu), Beylerbeyi Hacı Sabancı High School, Beylerbeyi Elementary School, and Lütfi Ercin Elementary School.

Cultural centers in the neighborhood include the Akbank Beylerbeyi Art Gallery and the Urart Art Center.

Mosques in the neighborhood include the Bostancıbaşı Abdullah Agha Mosque (1581; also known as the İstavroz Mosque), Hamid-i Evvel (Abdul Hamid I) Mosque (1778; also known as the Beylerbeyi Mosque), and Cennet (Heaven) Mosque (1967).

Cemeteries in the neighborhood include the Beylerbeyi Küplüce Cemetery.

Tekkes in the neighborhood include the Badawi Tekke of Beylerbeyi.

The neighborhood's football venue is Beylerbeyi 75. Yıl Stadium.
