= Refika Birgül =

Turkish writer and TV presenter

Refika Birgül (born May 19, 1980, Istanbul) is a food writer and television presenter. She is both the weekly food columnist of Refika’nın Mutfağı (Refika’s Kitchen) for Turkey's Hürriyet Daily News newspaper as well as the cooking program host of Mucize Lezzetler (Miracle Tastes). She hosts YouTube cooking channels in Turkish and English.

In 2010, Birgül published her first bilingual cookbook, Refika’nın Mutfağı/Cooking New Istanbul Style.

== Early life ==
Birgül was born in Istanbul into a large family dominated by medical professionals. Her mother is a Turkish Cypriot who is a native of Cyprus, and her father a native of Nevşehir. She was diagnosed with dyslexia at a young age; however, she exhibited a talent for adding large sums in her head, leading to a passion for mathematics (alongside black-and-white photography).

Birgül completed her undergraduate studies at Robert College, and has since studied psychology at Koç University and leadership education at London Business School.
