= Sultanzade =

Ottoman title

Sultanzade is an Ottoman title for sons of a sultana or imperial princesses, female descendants of the sovereign. The feminine equivalent is hanımsultan.

== Term ==
Sultan (سلطان) is a word of Arabic origin, originally meaning "authority" or "dominion" and -zade is a Persian suffix meaning 'son of', 'daughter of', 'descendant of', or 'born of'. Sultanzade literally means "descendant of sultan".

== Usage in Ottoman family ==
In the Ottoman family, sultanzade was a title used by sons of Ottoman princesses, who were female descendants of a sovereign. Unlike şehzades, sultanzades were excluded from the Ottoman imperial succession.

The formal way of addressing sultanzades was Sultanzade (given name) Bey-Efendi, i.e. Sir Prince Sultan (given name). Bey (Ottoman Turkish: باي) is a Turkish title for chieftain, traditionally applied to the leaders (for men) of small tribal groups. Effendi, Effendy, or Efendi (Ottoman Turkish: افندي) is a title of nobility meaning a Lord or Master. The official style of sons of sultanzades was simply bey, i.e. sir, after their name and daughters of sultanzades were simply hanım, i.e. madam after their name. These titles are still used by the Osmanoğlu family.

== Hanımsultan ==
The feminine equivalent title is hanımsultan (Ottoman Turkish: خانم سلطان), from the title hanım, Turkish form of the Mongolian title khanum, feminine equivalent of khan or khagan, with the title sultan, Arabic word originally meaning "authority" or "dominion". Hanımsultan is title for daughters of sultana or imperial princesses. The formal way of addressing hanımsultans were (given name) Hanımsultan, i.e. Sultana madam (given name).

== Examples of Sultanzade ==
- Sultanzade Mehmed Sabâhaddin Bey (13 February 1879 in Istanbul – 30 June 1948 in Neuchâtel, Switzerland), son of Seniha Sultan, daughter of Abdülmecid I. Ottoman sociologist and thinker. Because of his threat to the ruling House of Osman (the Ottoman dynasty) in the late 19th and early 20th centuries due to his political activity and push for democracy in the Empire, he was exiled.
- Sultanzade Ali Bey (1921-1971). Son of Naciye Sultan and great-grandson of Sultan Abdülmecid I.

== Examples of Hanımsultan ==
- Ayşe Hümaşah Sultan (1541 -1598) daughter of Mihrimah Sultan and granddaughter of Süleyman the Magnificent.
- Seniye Hanımsultan (1843-1913) - daughter of Atiye Sultan and granddaughter of Sultan Mahmud II.
- Hayriye Hanımsultan (1846-1869) - daughter of Adile Sultan and granddaughter of Mahmud II.
- Feride Hanımsultan (1847-1920) - daughter of Atiye Sultan and granddaughter of Mahmud II.
- Adile Hanımsultan (1900-1979) - daughter of Naime Sultan and granddaughter of Sultan Abdülhamid II.
- Nilüfer Hanımsultan (1916-1989) - daughter of Adile Sultan and great-granddaughter of Sultan Murad V.
- Selma Hanımsultan (1916-1942) - daughter of Hatice Sultan and granddaughter of Murad V, by marriage Rani of Kodtwara.
- Suade Hümeyra Hanımsultan (1917-2000) - daughter of Fatma Ulviye Sultan and granddaughter of Sultan Mehmed VI.
- Mahpeyker Hanımsultan (1917-2000) - daughter of Naciye Sultan and great-granddaughter of Sultan Abdülmecid I.
- Türkan Hanimsultan (1919-1989) - daughter of Naciye Sultan and great-granddaughter of Sultan Abdülmecid I.
- Sabiha Fazile Hanımsultan (n. 1941) - daughter of Zehra Hanzade Sultan and great-granddaughter of Sultan Mehmed VI and of caliph Abdülmecid II.

== See also ==
- List of Ottoman titles and appellations
- Şehzade
