= List of Ottoman titles and appellations =

This is a list of titles and appellations used in the Ottoman Empire. In place of surnames, Muslims in the Empire carried titles such as "Sultan", "Paşa", "Ağa", "Hoca", "Bey", "Hanım", "Efendi", etc. These titles either defined their formal profession (such as Pasha, Hoca, etc.) or their informal status within the society (such as Bey, Agha, Hanım, Efendi, etc.). Later, family surnames were made mandatory in Turkey by the 1934 Surname Law.

== Usage by Ottoman royalty ==
The sovereigns' main titles were Sultan, Padishah (Emperor) and Khan; which were of various origins such as Arabic, Persian and Turkish or Mongolian, respectively. His full style was the result of a long historical accumulation of titles expressing the empire's rights and claims as successor to the various states it annexed or subdued. Beside these imperial titles, Caesar of Rome (Kayser-i Rûm) was among the important titles claimed by Sultan Mehmed II after the conquest of Constantinople. The title sultan (سلطان), originally meaning "authority" or "dominion", used in an ungendered manner to encompass the whole imperial family, men and women, reflected the Ottoman conception of sovereign power as a "family prerogative". Male dynasty member carried the title before their given name, with female member carrying it after. Nevertheless, when used to refer to female dynasty members and relatives, the title sultan often translated to sultana in outside contexts, possibly to distinguish them from the Ottoman ruler. Hadrah or Hazretleri is honorific Arabic title; a literal translation of Hadrah is "Presence", which is often translated as "Your Highness".

=== Sovereign ===
The emperors' formal title consisted of Sultan together with Khan (in Turkish language the word became Han). This dual title symbolized the Ottomans' dual legitimating heritage, Islamic and Central Asian. Formal titles and styles:

- Short: Sultan (given name) Han Hazretleri, with the style of hünkarım (my sovereign, equivalent with "Your Imperial Majesty"), padişah efendim (my lord emperor), or sultanım (my sultan)
- The full style of the Ottoman sultan once the empire's frontiers had stabilized became:
  "Sultan (given name) Han, Sovereign of The Sublime House of Osman, Sultan us-Selatin (Sultan of Sultans), Hakan (Khan of Khans), Commander of the faithful and Successor of the Prophet of the Lord of the Universe, Caesar of Rome, Custodian of the Holy Cities of Mecca, Medina and Kouds (Jerusalem), Padishah (Emperor) of The Three Cities of Istanbul (Constantinople), Edirne (Adrianople) and Bursa, and of the Cities of Châm (Damascus) and Cairo (Egypt), of all Azerbaijan, of the Maghreb, of Barkah, of Kairouan, of Alep, of the Arab and Persian Iraq, of Basra, of El Hasa strip, of Raqqa, of Mosul, of Parthia, of Diyâr-ı Bekr, of Cilicia, of the provinces of Erzurum, of Sivas, of Adana, of Karaman, of Van, of Barbaria, of Habech (Abyssinia), of Tunisia, of Tripoli, of Châm (Syria), of Cyprus, of Rhodes, of Crete, of the province of Morea (Peloponnese), of Bahr-i Sefid (Mediterranean Sea), of Bahr-i Siyah (Black Sea), of Anatolia, of Rumelia (Land of the Romans), of Bagdad, of Kurdistan, of Greece, of Turkestan, of Tartary, of Circassia, of the two regions of Kabarda, of Gorjestan (Georgia), of the steppe of Kipchaks, of the whole country of the Tatars, of Kefa (Theodosia) and of all the neighbouring regions, of Bosnia, of the City and Fort of Belgrade, of the province of Sirbistan (Serbia), with all the castles and cities, of all Arnaut, of all Eflak (Wallachia) and Bogdania (Moldavia), as well as all the dependencies and borders, and many others countries and cities."

=== Dynasty member ===
==== Imperial prince ====
Male descendants of a sovereign in the male line.

- Çelebi (چلبى). Gentleman. Used before the reign of Mehmed II. Format style: "(given name) Çelebi".
- Şehzade or Şehzade Sultan (شاهزاده). Prince of the imperial blood. Format titles and styles:
  - Short: "Şehzade Sultan (given name)", i.e. Sultan Imperial Prince (given name) or "Şehzade (given name)", i.e. Imperial Prince (given name), with the style of şehzadem (my imperial prince) or efendim (my master).
  - Full: Devletlû Najabatlu Şehzade Sultan (given name) Hazretleri Efendi
- Vali Ahad (vali ahad). Crown Prince. Full titles and styles: Devletlû Najabatlu Valiahd-i Saltanat Şehzade-i Javanbahd (given name) Efendi Hazretleri.

==== Imperial princess ====
Female descendants of a sovereign in the male line.

- Hatun (خاتون). Lady. Used before 16th century and also used for sultan's mothers and consorts. In the 16th century, title sultan carried by prominent members of the imperial family and hatun carried by lesser female member.
  - Format style: "(given name) Hatun", i.e. Lady (given name)
- Sultan (سلطان). Princess of the imperial blood. Used after 16th century. Formal title:
  - Short: "(given name) Sultan", i.e. Sultana (given name), with the style of sultanım (my sultan(a)) or efendim (my mistress).
  - Full: Devletlû İsmetlu (given name) Sultân Aliyyetü'ş-Şân Hazretleri

==== Children of imperial princess ====
- Sultanzade (سلطانزاده). Son of princess of the imperial blood.
  - Formal title: "Sultanzade (given name) Bey-Efendi", i.e. Sir Prince Sultan (given name)
- Hanımsultan خانم سلطان). Daughter of princess of the imperial blood.
  - Formal title: "(given name) Hanımsultan", i.e. Madam Sultana (given name)

=== Relative of dynasty member ===
==== Imperial mother ====
Mothers of the reigning sultans

- Valide Hatun. Lady mother. Used before 16th century. Formal style: "(given name) Valide Hatun" or "Valide (given name) Hatun", i.e. Lady mother (given name).
- Valide Sultan (والدة السلطان). Sultana mother. Used after 16th century. Formal titles and styles:
  - Short: "(given name) Valide Sultan" or "Valide (given name) Sultan", i.e. Sultana mother (given name), with the style of sultanım (my sultan(a)) or validem (my mother).
  - Full: Devletlû İsmetlû (given name) Vâlide Sultân Aliyyetü'ş-Şân Hazretleri
- Büyük Valide Sultan. Grand or senior sultana mother. Grandmothers of the reigning sultans; first made by Murad III as a gift to his aunt Mihrimah Sultan at the beginning of his reign; later used by Safiye Sultan, during the reigns of her grandsons and great-grandson; last used by Kösem Sultan during the reign of her grandson Sultan Mehmed IV

==== Imperial female consort ====
Consorts of the sultan and prince of the blood.

- Haseki Sultan (خاصکى سلطان). Sultana consort. Title for the chief consort of the sultan in the 16th century and originally could not be held by more than one consort simultaneously. In later periods, the meaning of the title began to change from chief consort to something more general like a senior imperial consort when Sultan Ibrahim granted this title for his eight consorts. This title was only used until around the 17th century. Formal title:
  - Short: "(given name) Haseki Sultan" or "Haseki (given name) Sultan", i.e. Sultana consort (given name), with the style of sultanım (my sultan(a)) or efendim (my mistress).
  - Full: Devletlû İsmetlu (given name) Haseki Sultân Aliyyetü'ş-Şân Hazretleri
- Haseki Kadın. Lady consort. Title for sultan's consort who became mother of the imperial princes. This title was used around 17th century.
- Hatun (خاتون). Lady. Also used for imperial princesses and sultans' mothers. In the 16th century, the title sultan was carried by prominent members of the imperial family and hatun was carried by lesser female members.
  - Format style: "(given name) Hatun", i.e. Lady (given name)
- Kadınefendi (قادين افندی). Lady. Title given to main imperial consort of Ottoman sultan from the 17th century. The title was a replacement of the early title hatun.
  - Format style: "(given name) Kadınefendi", i.e. Lady (given name)
  - Full titles and styles: Devletlu İsmetlu (given name) (rank) Kadınefendi Hazretleri
- Hanımefendi (خانم آفندی). Madam. Title given to the imperial consort of the Sultan of the Ottoman Empire from the 17th century, who came below the rank of kadınefendi. The title was also given to the official consorts of the imperial princes.

==== Imperial male consort ====
Husbands of princess of the blood.

- Damad (داماد). Full titles and styles: Damat-i Shahriyari (given name) Bey Efendi.

== During the time of Suleiman ==
Titles and appellations in the time of Suleiman the Magnificent, from Albert Howe Lybyer's book "The government of the Ottoman Empire in the time of Suleiman the Magnificent":

- Agha (Ottoman Turkish: آغا, Turkish: ağa): a general officer.
- Ajem-oghlan (Ottoman Turkish: عجمی اوغلان, Turkish: acemi oğlan): a cadet or apprentice Janissary.
- Akinji (Ottoman Turkish: آقنجى, Turkish: akıncı): the irregular cavalry.
- Ashji-bashi (Commons) Ottoman Turkish: آشجی باشی, Turkish: aşcıbaşı): a chief cook
- Azab (Ottoman Turkish: عزب, Turkish: azap): the irregular infantry.
- Bashi (Ottoman Turkish: باشی, Turkish: -başı): The Head or Chief of an organization.
- Berat-emini (Ottoman Turkish: برات امینی): a distributor of ordinances.
- Boluk-bashi (Ottoman Turkish: بولق باشی, Turkish: bölükbaşı): a captain of the Janissaries.
- Bostanji (Ottoman Turkish: بوستانجی, Turkish: bostancı): a gardener; a euphemism for the Sultan's palace guard.
- Bostanji-bashi (Ottoman Turkish: بوستانجی باشی, Turkish: bostancıbaşı): The "chief gardener" and head of the palace guard. Equivalent to the rank of pasha.
- Chakirji (Ottoman Turkish: چاقرجی, Turkish: çakırcı): a falconer.
- Chasneji (Ottoman Turkish: چشنیجی, Turkish: çeşnici): a taster.
- Chasneji-bashi (Ottoman Turkish: چشنیجی باشی, Turkish: çeşnicibaşı): the chief taster.
- Tchaoush or Chaush (Ottoman Turkish: چاووش, Turkish: çavuş): an usher.
- Çavuşbaşı or Chaush-bashi (Ottoman Turkish: چاووش باشی, Turkish: çavuşbaşı): chief of the Chaushes, and a high court official. Equivalent to the rank of pasha.
- Chelebi (Ottoman Turkish: چلبى, Turkish: çelebi): a gentleman.
- Cheri-bashi (Ottoman Turkish: چری باشی, Turkish: çeribaşı): a petty officer of feudal cavalry.
- Danishmend (Ottoman Turkish: دانشمند, Turkish: danişmend): a master of arts.
- Defterdar (Ottoman Turkish: دفتردار, Modern Turkish: defterdar): a treasurer.
- Defter-emini (Ottoman Turkish: دفتر امینی): a recorder of fiefs.
- Deli (Ottoman Turkish: دلی, Modern Turkish: deli): appellation of a scout or a captain of the Akinji.
- Derebey: a feudal lord in Anatolia and the Pontic areas in the 18th century.
- Dervish (Ottoman Turkish: درویش, Modern Turkish: derviş): a member of a Muslim religious order.
- Deveji (Ottoman Turkish: دوه جی, Modern Turkish: deveci): a camel-driver.
- Emin (Ottoman Turkish: آمین, Modern Turkish: emin): an intendant.
- Emir (Ottoman Turkish: امیر, Modern Turkish: emir): a descendant of the Islamic prophet Muhammad.; a commander, a governor.
- Emir al-Akhor (Ottoman Turkish: امير الآخر, Modern Turkish: ahır bakıcısı): a grand equerry.
- Ghurabâ (Ottoman Turkish: غربا, Modern Turkish: guraba): a member of the lowest corps of the standing cavalry.
- Gonnullu (Ottoman Turkish: گوڭـللو, Modern Turkish: gönüllü): a volunteer soldier or sailor.
- Grand vizier
- Hekim-bashi (Ottoman Turkish: حکیم باشی, Modern Turkish: hekimbaşı): a chief physician.
- Helvaji-bashi (Ottoman Turkish: حلواجی باشی, Modern Turkish: helvacıbaşı): a chief confectioner.
- Hoja (Ottoman Turkish: خواجه, Modern Turkish: hoca): a teacher; the Sultan's adviser.
- Ikinji Kapu-oghlan (Ottoman Turkish: ایکنجی قاپی اوغلان, Modern Turkish: ikinci kapıoğlan): a white eunuch in charge of the second gate of the palace.
- Imam (Ottoman Turkish: امام, Modern Turkish: imam) the Caliph or lawful successor of Mohammed; a leader of daily prayers.
- Iskemleji (Ottoman Turkish: اسکمله جی, Modern Turkish: iskemleci): a page of high rank.
- Itch-oghlan (Ottoman Turkish: ایچ اوغلان, Modern Turkish: içoğlan): a page in one of the Sultan's palaces.
- Jebeji-bashi (Ottoman Turkish: جيب جي باشي, Modern Turkish: cebecibaşı): a chief armorer.
- Jerrah-bashi (Ottoman Turkish: جراح باشی, Modern Turkish: cerrahbaşı): a chief surgeon.
- Kâim (Ottoman Turkish: قائم, Modern Turkish: kaim): a caretaker of a mosque.
- Kanuni (Ottoman Turkish: قانونی, Modern Turkish: kanuni): legislator.
- Kapu Aghasi (Ottoman Turkish: قاپی آغاسی, Modern Turkish: kapıağası): the white eunuch in charge of the principal palace.
- Kapudan Pasha (Ottoman Turkish: کاپیتان پاشا, Modern Turkish: kaptan paşa) an admiral.
- Kapuji (Ottoman Turkish: قاپی جی, Modern Turkish: kapıcı): a gatekeeper.
- Kapuji-bashi (Ottoman Turkish: قاپی جی باشی, Modern Turkish: kapıcıbaşı): literally "head gatekeeper"; master of ceremonies.
- Kapujilar-kiayasi (Ottoman Turkish: قاپی جی لر قایاسی, Modern Turkish: kapıcılar kâhyası): a grand chamberlain.
- Katib (Modern Turkish: Kâtib): scribe or secretary
- Kazi or Kadi (Ottoman Turkish: قاضی, Modern Turkish: kadı): a judge.
- Kazasker (Ottoman Turkish: قاضيعسكر, Modern Turkish: kadıasker): one of the two chief judges of the Ottoman Empire, entrusted with military matters.
- Kharaji (Carzeri, Caragi), a non-Muslim who pays the kharij.
- Khatib, a leader of Friday prayers.
- Khazinehdar-bashi (Ottoman Turkish: خزانه دار باشی, Modern Turkish: hazinedarbaşı), a treasurer-in-chief.
- Khazineh-odassi (chamber of the treasury), the second chamber of pages.
- Khojagan, a chief of a treasury bureau.
- Kiaya (Cacaia, Cahaia, Caia, Checaya, Chechessi, Chiccaia, Chietcudasci, Gachaia, Ketkhuda, Quaia, Queaya) (common form of ketkhuda), a steward or lieutenant.
- Kiaya-bey, the lieutenant of the grand vizier.
- Kiaya Katibi, a private secretary of the Kiaya-bey.
- Kilerji-bashi, a chief of the sultan's pantry.
- Kizlar Aghasi (general of the girls), the black eunuch in charge of the palace of the harem.
- Kul, a slave; one of the sultan's slave-family.
- Masraf-shehriyari (imperial steward), substitute for the intendant of kitchen.
- Mektubji, a private secretary of the grand vizier.
- Mihter (Mecter), a tent-pitcher; a musician.
- Mihter-bashi, the chief tent-pitcher.
- Mir Alem, the imperial standard bearer.
- Molla, a judge of high rank.
- Mosellem, a fief holder by ancient tenure.
- Muderis, a professor in a Medresseh.
- Muezzin, one who calls Muslims to prayer.
- Mufettish, a special judge dealing with endowments.
- Mufti, a Muslim legal authority; in particular, the Sheik ul-Islam.
- Muhtesib, a lieutenant of police.
- Mujtahid, a doctor of the Sacred Law.
- Mulazim (candidate), a graduate of the higher Medressehs.
- Munejim-bashi, a chief astrologer.
- Muste emin, a resident foreigner.
- Mutbakh-emini, intendant of the kitchen.
- Muteveli, an administrator of an endowment.
- Naib, an inferior judge.
- Nakib ol-Eshraf, the Chief of the Seids or descendants of Muhammad.
- Nazir, an inspector of an endowment.
- Nishanji, a chancellor.
- Nizam al-mulk, basis of the order of the kingdom (title of a vizier of Melek Shah).
- Oda-bashi (head of chamber), the page of highest rank; a corporal of the Janissaries.
- Papuji, a page of high rank.
- Pasha (Bascia, Bassa), a very high official.
- Peik, a member of the body-guard of halbardiers.
- Reis Effendi, or Reis ul-Khuttab, a recording secretary; a recording secretary of the Divan, later an important minister of state.
- Rekiab-Aghalari (generals of the stirrup), a group of high officers of the outside service of the palace.
- Rusnamehji, a chief book-keeper of the Treasury.
- Sakka, a water-carrier.
- Sanjak-bey, a high officer of feudal, cavalry and governor of a Sanjak.
- Sarraf, a banker.
- Segban-bashi (Seymen-bashi) (master of the hounds), the second officer of the corps of Janissaries.
- Seid, a descendant of the Islamic prophet Muhammad.
- Seraskier, a commander-in-chief.
- Serraj, saddlers.
- Shahinji, a falconer.
- Sharabdar (Seracter) (drink-bearer), a page of high rank.
- Shehr-emini (Saremin), intendant of imperial buildings.
- Sheik, a preacher; a head of a religious community.
- Sheik ul-Islam, the Mufti of Constantinople and head of the Muslim Institution.
- Sherif, a descendant of the Islamic prophet Muhammad.
- Silahdar (Silahtar, Selicter, Sillictar, Suiastrus, Suluphtar) (sword-bearer), a member of the second corps of standing cavalry; the page who carried the sultan's arms.
  - Silahdar Agha
- Sofi, woolen; a dervish (an appellation of the Shah of Persia).
- Softa (Sukhta), an undergraduate in a Medresseh.
- Solak (left-handed), a janissary bowman of the sultan's personal guard.
- Sipahi (Sipah, Sipahi, Spachi, Spai), a cavalry soldier; a member of the standing or feudal cavalry.
- Spahi-oghlan (Spacoillain) (cavalry youth), a member of the highest corps of the standing cavalry.
- Subashi, a captain of the feudal cavalry and governor of a town.
- Sultan (سلطان), is a word Arabic origin, originally meaning "authority" or "dominion". By the beginning of the 16th century, this title, carried by both men and women of the Ottoman dynasty, was replacing other titles by which prominent members of the imperial family had been known (notably hatun for women and bey for men), with emperor and imperial princes (Şehzade) carrying the title before their given name, with sultan's mother, imperial princesses, and main imperial consort carrying it after. This usage underlines the Ottoman conception of sovereign power as family prerogative.
- Tahvil Kalemi, a bureau of the Chancery.
- Terjuman, an interpreter (dragoman).
- Terjuman Divani Humayun, a chief interpreter of the sultan.
- Teshrifatji, a master of ceremonies.
- Teskereji, a master of petitions.
- Teskereji-bashi (chief of document-writers), the Nishanji.
- Timarji, the holder of a Timar.
- Ulufaji (Ouloufedgis, Allophase, Holofagi) (paid troops), a member of the third corps of the sultan's standing cavalry.
- Veznedar, an official weigher of money.
- Vizier (burden-bearer), a minister of state.
- Voivode (Slavic), an officer, a governor.
- Yaya, a fief holder by ancient tenure, owing infantry service.
- Yaziji (laxagi), a scribe or secretary.
- Zagarji-bashi (master of the harriers), a high officer of the Janissaries.
- Zanijiler (Italianized), lancers or Voinaks (?).
- Zarabkhane-emini, intendant of mints and mines.
- Ziam, the holder of a Ziamet.

== Other princely, noble, aristocratic, and honorific titles ==
Other titles include:

- Agha (or Agha, Ağası): commander, a title junior to Bey and conferred on military officers on a personal basis.
- Alp: brave warrior or knight; a title conferred during the early years of Ottoman rule.
- Amir al-Hajj: Commander of the Hajj Pilgrimage, a title for the annual commanders of the Hajj pilgrimage caravans from Damascus and Cairo.
- Amir ul-Muminin or Emirülmüminin: Commander of the Faithful, one of the many titles of the Sultan.
- Ottoman Ayan: local notables or dynasts that maintained different extents of administrative control over swaths of land in the Ottoman Empire from the 16th to the early 19th centuries.
- Bey: a title junior to Pasha and conferred on civil and military officers on a personal basis; also borne as a courtesy title for the sons of a Pasha.
- Beg, an ancient Turkic administrative title (chieftain, governor etc.).
- Bey Effendi: part of the title of a husband and sons of an Imperial Princess.
- Beylerbey (or Beglerbegi): Lord of Lords. An office signifying rule over a great province, equivalent to Governor-General. The office entitled the holder to the personal title of Pasha.
- Beyzade: son of a Bey, a courtesy title borne by a son of a Bey Effendi.
- Binbashi: (literally "Head of 1000") Major (army) or Commander (navy). The holder of the rank enjoyed the title of Effendi.
- Cariye: slave concubines, the lowest rank of the women of the harem, and the rank almost all harem women when they first entered the harem.
- Çavuş: "messenger", used for two separate soldier professions, both acting as messengers although differing in levels.
- Çavuşbaşı or Başçavuş: "head messenger", assistant (or deputy) to the Grand Vizier.
- Çelebi: gentleman, a title indicating a high social status
- Chiflik Rulers: Compared to Christian feudal system the chiflik rulers controlled land holdings. These land holdings could be passed on to their sons.
- Khalif (also Caliph or Khalifa): Successor (of the Prophet).
- Khalifat Rasul Rub al-A'alimin: Successor of the Prophet of the Lord of the Universe. The highest earthly title of the Muslim world, enjoyed by the Sultans of Turkey after their conquest of Egypt in 1517.
- Damad-i-Shahriyari: Imperial son-in-law, title conferred on the husbands of Imperial Princesses.
- Damat: was an official Ottoman title describing men that entered the imperial House of Osman by means of marriage, literally becoming the bridegroom to the Ottoman sultan and the dynasty.
- Devletlû: a title of imperial gentry.
- Divan: was a high government ministry in North Africa.
- Dragoman: was an interpreter, translator, and official guide.
- Dragoman of the Fleet: was a senior office.
- Efe: was a irregular military office.
- Effendi: master, title equivalent to Esquire; frequently used together with higher titles in order to indicate, signify enhanced status. Used by the sons of Sultans from the reign of Sultan 'Abdu'l Majid I.
- Ferik: Lieutenant-General (army) or Vice-Admiral (navy). The holder of the rank enjoyed the title of Pasha.
- Ghazi: victorious, a title conferred on leaders who distinguish themselves in war.
- Gözde: noticed (by the Sultan). Style borne by junior ladies of the Harem when first gaining favour from the Sultan.
- Hanım: female of Khan, equivalent to Lady.
- Hanımsultan: Title borne by the daughters of Imperial Princesses.
- Haji (or Hacci): honorific used for men who have made the pilgrimage to Mecca.
- Hakhan ul-Barrayun wa al-Bahrain: Lord of the Lands and Seas, one of the many titles of the Sultan.
- Haseki Sultan (خاصکي سلطان): Title borne by Empress Consort (only for Hürrem Sultan) then at the end of the 16th century it is used as the Main Consort or Imperial Consort of the Sultan and in the 17th century it would be used as the Main Woman or Only Favorite.
- Hazretleri: style equivalent to Highness.
- Hazinedar: The High Hazinedar or First Hazinedar or Hazinedar Usta was a title of the housemistress of the sultan's palace, the most influential person after the prince.
- Hospodar: was a title had been held by many vassals of the sultan,
- Ikbal or İkbâl (اقبال): title borne by the junior wives of the Sultan in the 19th and 20th century, who came below the rank of Kadın.
- Kadın (قادين): Title borne by the senior wives of the Sultan from the late 16th century and early 20th century. The title was a replacement of the early title, Hatun.
- Kaimakam: Lieutenant-Colonel (army) or Commander (navy). The holder of the rank enjoyed the title of Bey.
- Kapıcıbaşı: general of the palace guards.
- Katib: secretary of the Kiaya bey.
- Katkhuda: Second in command to the Agha in the Janissary corps
- Khan (or Hân): a title signifying sovereign or ruler in Turkey, but a very junior title signifying a male noble, or even a mere name, in other parts of the Muslim world.
- Khadim ul-Haramain us-Sharifain: Protector of the Holy Cities of Mecca and Medina, a title awarded to Selim I by the Sherif of Mecca.
- Khakhan: Khan of Khans, one of the many titles of the Sultan of Turkey.
- Khedive: Governor of Egypt and Sudan, and vassal of the Ottoman Empire.
- Kizlar Aghasi: Chief of the Eunuchs. The office entitled the holder to the style of His Highness.
- Kapudan Pasha: Grand Admiral or Admiral of the Fleet. The holder of the rank enjoyed the title of Pasha.
- Kayzer-i Rûm: Caesar of Rome, Emperor (i.e.; the Ottoman Sultan).
- Kodjabashis: local Christian notables in parts of Ottoman Greece who exercised considerable influence and held posts in the Ottoman administration.
- Lala: were the experienced statesmen who were assigned as the tutors of young princes.
- Lewa (or Liva): Major-General (army) or Rear-Admiral (navy). The holder of the rank enjoyed the title of Pasha.
- Mahd-i Ulya-i-Sultanat: "Cradle of the Great Sultan," another title for the Sultan's mother.
- Miralay or mir-i alay: Colonel (army) or Captain (navy). The holder of the rank enjoyed the title of Bey.
- Muhtasib: meaning market overseer, market inspector, or master of the bazaar, who supervised weights and measures in the market.
- Mulazim Awal: Lieutenant (army) or Sub-Lieutenant (navy). The holder of the rank enjoyed the title of Effendi.
- Mulazim Tani: Second Lieutenant (army) or Midshipman (navy). The holder of the rank enjoyed the title of Effendi.
- Mushir: Field Marshal. The holder of the rank enjoyed the title of Pasha.
- Naqib al-ashraf: Supervisor or head of the Islamic Prophet Muhammad's Descendants (ashraf)
- Nishan (or Nichan): order of chivalry or decoration of honour.
- Padshah (or Padishah): Emperor, one of the many titles of the Sultan of Turkey.
- Pasha: Lord, a title senior to that of Bey and conferred on a personal basis on senior civil officials and military officers. Awarded in several grades, signified by a whip, the highest rank being a whip of three yak or horse tails.
- Pashazadeh: son of a Pasha, used as an alternative courtesy title to Bey.
- Reis: naval captain or commodore.
- Sadaf-i-Durr-i-Khilafat: shell of the pearl of the caliphate, another title for the mother of the Sultan.
- Saraskar: C-in-C.
- Shah: King, title of Persian origin.
- Shah-i-Alam Panah: King, refuge of the world, one of the titles of the Sultan.
- Shahzada (or Shahzade): son of the King, title used for the sons of Sultans from the reign of Mehmed I.
- Shaikh ul-Islam: the title held by the highest ranking Muslim religious official below the Khalif. The office entitled the holder to the personal title of Pasha together the style of His Highness.
- Shalabi (or Çelebi): gracious lord, title borne by sons of the Sultan until the reign of Mehmed II.
- Silahadar: Master-General of the Ordnance.
- Sipah Salar: General of Cavalry.
- Sultan: title borne by male members of the Imperial family, particularly after the reign of Mehmed II. When it is used before the given name, together with Khan after the name, it signifies ruler. When used before the name, Imperial Prince. When used after the name, Imperial Princess.
- Sultan Khan: The Grand Sultan, the chief title borne by the ruler of Turkey and the Ottoman Empire, equivalent to Emperor.
- Sultan us-Selatin: Sultan of Sultan, one of the many titles of the Sultan of Turkey.
- Sultanzade (or Sultanzada): literally "son of a Sultan", the title borne by the sons of Imperial Princesses.
- Sünnetçi: Circumciser.
- Vali: Governor. The office entitled the holder to the personal title of Pasha.
- Vali Ahad (or Veliaht): Heir Apparent or Presumptive usually translated as Crown Prince.
- Valide Sultan: The title borne by the "legal mother" of a reigning Sultan from the 16th century.
- Vizier: bearer of the burden, i.e. Minister.
- Vizier-i-Azam: Grand Vizier, the title borne by the incumbent Prime Minister. The office entitled the holder to the personal title of Pasha together the style of His Highness.
- Yuzbashi (or Youzbashi): Captain (army) or Lieutenant (navy). The holder of the rank enjoyed the title of Effendi.

== See also ==
- Surname Law
- Ottoman clothing
- List of Mamluk titles and appellations
