= Fazile Hanımsultan =

Egyptian and Ottoman princess (1941–2024)

- Born: 8 August 1941; Neuilly-sur-Seine, German-occupied France
- Died: 27 September 2024 (aged 83); Istanbul, Turkey
- Spouse: Hayri Ürgüplü (m. 1965; div. 1980) Jean-Alphonse Bernard (m. 1983; died 2015)
- Issue: First marriage; Ali Suad Ürgüplü; Mehmed Selim Ürgüplü
Names
- Turkish: Sabiha Fazile Hanımsultan
- Dynasty: Ottoman; Muhammad Ali
- Father: Prince Mehmed Ali Ibrahim of Egypt
- Mother: Zehra Hanzade Sultan
- Religion: Sunni Islam

Sabiha Fazile Hanımsultan (8 August 1941 – 27 September 2024), also called Fazile Ibrahim, was an Egyptian and Ottoman princess, daughter of Prince Mehmed Ali Ibrahim of Egypt and princess Zehra Hanzade Sultan.

== Biography ==
Princess Sabiha Fazile Hanımsultan of Egypt was born on 8 August 1941 in Neuilly-sur-Seine, France. She was the daughter of Prince Mehmed Ali Ibrahim of Egypt and Ottoman Princess Zehra Hanzade Sultan, daughter of Şehzade Ömer Faruk (son of Caliph Abdülmecid II) and Rukiye Sabiha Sultan (daughter of Sultan Mehmed VI). She had a younger brother, Sultanzade Ahmed Rifat Bey.

She was educated at the Heathfield School, Ascot.

In September 1957, she went to Iraq to meet King Faisal II, to whom she was engaged through the mediation of her relative, Şehzade Mahmud Namık. The engagement came as a shock to her parents, as Fazile, the daughter of two exiled dynasties, was only sixteen and still in school, but they agreed anyway. However, on 14 July 1958, two weeks before the date of the wedding, Faisal was assassinated in a coup.

On 10 April 1965, Fazile married Hayri Ürgüplü (born 31 May 1936), son of Suat Hayri Ürgüplü, in Paris. The couple had two sons: Ali Suad Ürgüplü (born 28 September 1967) and Mehmed Selim Ürgüplü (born 31 October 1968). The couple divorced on 24 September 1980.

Fazile married secondly Jean-Alphonse Bernard on 18 June 1983, with whom she lived in France. She was widowed in 2015. Fazile died in Istanbul on 27 September 2024, at the age of 83. She was buried with her mother, in the Aşiyan Asri Cemetery in Istanbul.
