= Necla Sultan =

Ottoman princess

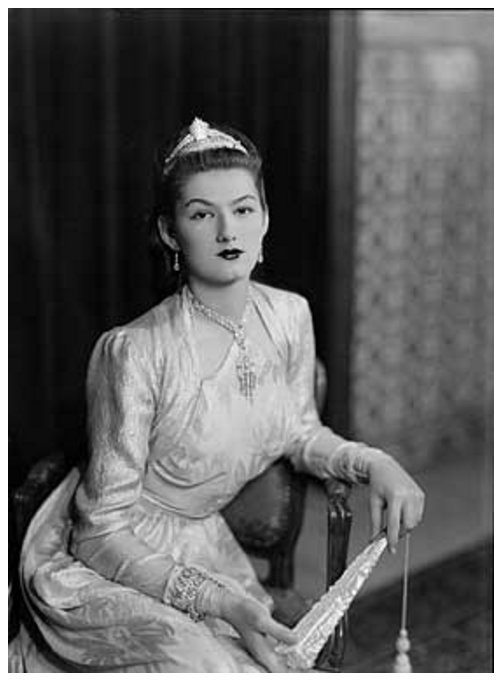
- Necla Sultan on her wedding day, 1943
- Born: 16 May 1926; Nice, France
- Died: 6 October 2006 (aged 80); Madrid, Spain
- Burial: Aşiyan Asri Cemetery, Istanbul
- Spouse: Prince Amr Ibrahim (m. 1943; died 1977)
- Issue: Prince Sultanzade Osman Rifat Ibrahim Bey
Names
- Turkish: Necla Hibetullah Sultan; Ottoman Turkish: نجله هبت الله سلطان
- Dynasty: Ottoman (by birth); Alawiyya (by marriage)
- Father: Şehzade Ömer Faruk
- Mother: Sabiha Sultan
- Religion: Sunni Islam

Necla Hibetullah Sultan (Ottoman Turkish: نجله هبت الله سلطان; also Necla Osmanoğlu, 16 May 1926 – 6 October 2006) was an Ottoman princess, the daughter Şehzade Ömer Faruk, the son of the last caliph, Abdulmejid II, and Şehsuvar Hanım. Her mother was Sabiha Sultan, daughter of Sultan Mehmed VI and Nazikeda Kadın.

== Early life ==
Necla Sultan was born on 16 May 1926 in Nice, France. Her father was Şehzade Ömer Faruk, son of Abdulmejid II and Şehsuvar Hanım, and her mother was Sabiha Sultan, daughter of Mehmed VI and Nazikeda Kadın. She was the youngest child of her parents. She had two sisters, Neslişah Sultan, five years older than her and Zehra Hanzade Sultan, three years older than her.

Upon the news of her birth, her paternal grandfather Abdulmejid, named her Hibetullah, whereas her maternal grandfather Mehmed, sent a telegram from Sanremo, Italy conveying his blessings and naming her Necla. Hence her name was 'Necla Hibetullah'. However, some hours later another telegram arrived from Sanremo, stating that Sultan Mehmed had died some hours after the birth of Necla, hence the day turned sorrowful.

Necla spent her childhood in France. Behzade Kalfa took care of Necla when she was young. As Behzade had cold relations with her grandfather, she did her competence to set her against her grandmother Şehsuvar, but despite this negative side she took care of Necla splendidly.

For their early education, she and her sisters were enrolled in the public school where she and they received their early education from, there they were taught English, French and German. The princesses received their religious education at home and were taught the Ottoman alphabet by Kamil Bey Kiligil, the second husband of Naciye Sultan, who taught the three princesses alongside his own stepchildren Mahpeyker Hanımsultan, Türkan Hanımsultan and Sultanzade Ali Bey, every Sunday.

In 1938, Necla, her parents and sisters moved to Egypt, whereas their grandfather moved to Paris.

== Marriage ==
In 1940, due to World War II Necla and her family were impoverished, as Abdulmejid wasn't able to send them money. The same year, her sisters married Egyptian princes: Neslişah married Prince Muhammad Abdel Moneim, and Hanzade married Prince Muhammad Ali.

In 1943, Necla married Egyptian prince, Amr Ibrahim in Cairo, Egypt, hence the three sisters were all married into the same dynasty, and were styled as "princesses of Egypt and princesses of Ottoman Empire". The couple's only child, a son Prince Osman Rifat was born on 20 May 1951 in Cairo. In 1953, Necla, her husband and son settled in Switzerland, after the proclamation of Egypt as a republic in 1952.

Necla's father, Ömer Faruk developed an increased interest in his cousin Mihrişah Sultan, the daughter of crown prince Şehzade Yusuf Izzeddin. It was also public knowledge that things were not going well between Faruk and her mother Sabiha. She and her sisters sided with their mother. Faruk accused Sabiha of turning their daughters against him. But he was already in love with Mihrişah and the issue of the council was just an excuse. In 1948, after twenty-eight years of marriage, Faruk divorced Sabiha, and married Mihrişah, After the revocation of the law of exile for princesses in 1952, her mother moved to Istanbul. Necla was widowed by the death of Amr Ibrahim in 1977.

== Death ==
Necla Sultan died on 6 October 2006, at the age of eighty in Madrid, Spain. On 16 October her body was taken to Istanbul. The funeral took place in Bebek Mosque, and was attended by her eldest sister Neslişah, her son Osman Rifat, and other members of Ottoman dynasty. She was buried beside her mother and elder sister Hanzade in Aşiyan Asri Cemetery, Istanbul.

== Issue ==
By her marriage, Necla Sultan had a son:

- Prince Sultanzade Osman Rifat Ibrahim Bey (20 May 1951 – 1 February 2025). Born in Cairo. He died unmarried and spent most of his life in Madrid, where he died as well.

== Honour ==
- Dame Grand Cross of the Order of the Eagle of Georgia

== See also ==
- Prince Amr Ibrahim Palace

== Sources ==
- Bardakçı, Murat (2017). Neslishah: The Last Ottoman Princess. Oxford University Press. ISBN 978-9-774-16837-6.
