= Türkan Hanımsultan =

Ottoman princess, daughter of Naciye Sultan and Enver Pasha

- Born: 4 July 1919; Kuruçeşme Palace, Constantinople, Ottoman Empire (now Istanbul, Turkey)
- Died: 25 December 1989 (aged 70); Ankara, Turkey
- Spouse: Hüveyda Mayatepek (m. 1945; died 1973)
- Issue: Osman Mayatepek
Names
- Turkish: Türkan Hanımsultan; Ottoman Turkish: ترکان خانم سلطان
- Father: Enver Pasha
- Mother: Naciye Sultan
- Religion: Sunni Islam

Türkan Hanımsultan (Ottoman Turkish: ترکان خانم سلطان; 4 July 1919 – 25 December 1989) also Türkan Mayatepek or Türkan Enver, was an Ottoman princess, the daughter of Naciye Sultan and Enver Pasha.

== Biography ==
Türkan Hanımsultan was born on 4 July 1919 in the Kuruçeşme Palace. Her father was Ismail Enver Pasha, son of Ahmed Bey and Ayşe Dilara Hanım, and her mother was Naciye Sultan, daughter of Şehzade Selim Süleyman and Ayşe Tarzıter Hanım. She had an older sister, Mahpeyker Hanımsultan and a younger brother, Sultanzade Ali Bey. She had a younger maternal half-sister, Rana Hanımsultan, from her mother's second marriage to Kamil Bey, younger brother of Türkan's father. In 1920, during her father's stay in Berlin, Türkan, her mother and sister Mahpeyker joined him, where her younger brother Sultanzade Ali Enver was born in 1921. Her father left for the Russian SSR, while her family remained there. After his death in 1922, they returned to Istanbul. Upon the exile of the imperial family in March 1924, Türkan and her family settled in Paris, France, and later in Nice.

During the exile, Türkan was educated along with her siblings by her uncle, and stepfather Kamil Pasha. Kamil Pasha taught them to read and write old Turkish alphabet along with princesses Neslişah Sultan, Hanzade Sultan and Necla Sultan on every Sunday. In 1939, a special law was passed for Türkan and her siblings, which allowed them to return to Turkey, the law was effective on 25 May 1939, after which Türkan and her siblings returned to Istanbul. During World War II, Türkan along with her sister Mahpeyker were brought to Switzerland by their uncle Nuri Pasha, however Ali chose to remain in Istanbul, due to studies, they both returned back to Istanbul in 1943.

Türkan studied chemistry and went on to become a chemical engineer. She also taught chemistry at various schools. She also briefly worked for the Turkish Radio and Television Corporation (TRT). In 1945, Türkan married Hüveyda Mayatepek, an ambassador, and son of Hasan Tahsin Mayatepek, also a diplomat, in Istanbul. The couple later settled in Geneva, Switzerland, where their only son, Osman Mayatepek was born on 1 June 1950. Hüveyda died on 1 May 1973 in Vienna, Austria.

Türkan died on 25 December 1989 at the age of seventy in Ankara, Turkey and was buried there.

== Issue ==
Name	Birth	Death	Notes
Osman Mayatepek	1 June 1950	1 November 2016	he married twice: a woman called Anne and later Neshe Firtina on 6 July 1991. By Neshe he had a daughter, Mihrişah Türkan (b. 25 May 1952); Died and buried in Istanbul;

== Ancestry ==
Ancestors of Türkan Hanımsultan

4. Ahmed Bey
2. Enver Pasha
5. Ayşe Dilara Hanım
1. Türkan Hanımsultan
12. Abdulmejid I
6. Şehzade Selim Süleyman
13. Serfiraz Hanım
3. Naciye Sultan
7. Ayşe Tarzıter Hanım

== Sources ==
- Bardakçı, Murat (2017). Neslishah: The Last Ottoman Princess. Oxford University Press. ISBN 978-9-774-16837-6.
- Milanlıoğlu, Neval (2011). Emine Naciye Sultan'ın Hayatı (1896-1957) (Postgraguate Thesis) (in Turkish). Marmara University Institute of Social Sciences.
- Sönmez, Cahi̇de (2014). "Sürgünden Vatana Osmanlı Hanedanının Geri Dönen İlk Üyeleri (1924-1951)". Tarihin Peşinde (in Turkish). 6 (12).
