= Hanım (disambiguation) =

Hanım may refer to:

- Khanum (Turkish Hanım), a female royal and aristocratic title
- Hanım (film), 1988 Turkish film
- Hanımsultan, title for the daughters of Ottoman princesses

== See also ==
- Humanoid animation, sometimes called H-anim
- Sadberk Hanım Museum
