= Sultanzade Ali Bey =

Ottoman prince, son of Naciye Sultan and Enver Pasha

- Born: 29 September 1921; Berlin, Weimar Republic (now Germany)
- Died: 2 December 1971 (aged 50); Australia
- Spouse: Perizad Hanım (m. 1948; div. 1964) May Britt (m. 1954)
- Issue: Arzu Enver Akoğlu
Names
- Turkish: Sultanzade Ali Bey; Ottoman Turkish: سلطان زادہ علی بك
- Father: Enver Pasha
- Mother: Naciye Sultan
- Religion: Sunni Islam

Sultanzade Ali Bey (Ottoman Turkish: سلطان زادہ علی بك; 29 September 1921 – 2 December 1971), also Ali Akoğlu, was a Turkish military pilot. He was the son of Naciye Sultan and Enver Pasha.

== Early life ==
Sultanzade Ali Bey was born on 29 September 1921 in Berlin, Germany. His father was Ismail Enver Pasha, son of Ahmed Bey and Ayşe Dilara Hanım, and his mother was Naciye Sultan, daughter of Şehzade Selim Süleyman and Ayşe Tarzıter Hanım. He had two older sisters, Mahpeyker Hanımsultan and Türkan Hanımsultan. He had a younger maternal half-sister, Rana Hanımsultan, from his mother's second marriage to Mehmed Kamil Bey, younger brother of Ali's father. At the time of his birth, his family was residing in Germany. His father left for the Russian SSR while her family remained there. Ali was born after his father left and never met him, because Enver died in Russia shortly after. After Enver death in 1922, his family returned to Istanbul. At the exile of the imperial family in March 1924, Ali and his family settled in Paris, France, and later in Nice.

== Education and career ==
During the exile, Ali was educated along with his siblings by his uncle, and stepfather Kamil Pasha. Kamil Pasha used to teach them the old Turkish alphabet along with Neslişah Sultan, Hanzade Sultan and Necla Sultan on every Sunday. In 1939, a special law was passed for Ali and his siblings, which allowed them to return to Turkey. The law came into effect on 25 May 1939, after which Ali and his sisters returned to Istanbul. During World War II, Ali's sisters went to Switzerland to their mother, however he chose to remain in Istanbul, to continue his studies.

Ali was enrolled into Galatasaray High School where he studied for a year. Following his education at the college, he joined the military academy in 1939, following the footsteps on his father, and graduated from the academy in the winter of 1941 due to the World War II. Ali also studied at the Turkish Aeronautical Association and practiced parachuting there. In 1942, Ali travelled to England to complete his undergraduate education, and acquired his aviation training there, he returned to Turkey in 1944. Ali also served in the Turkish Air Force until 1956. He was able to speak English, French, German and Italian. He also served as a fire assistant in London, England.

== Personal life and death ==
Ali married Perizad Abedin, the daughter of Abidin Daver, a prominent journalist and politician in 1948. On 15 September 1955, she gave birth to the couple's only child, a daughter Arzu Enver in Naples, Italy (she married Arslan Sadikoglu and had a son, Burak). In 1964, the couple divorced and then Ali married a foreign woman named May Britt and went to live in Australia.

Ali died on 2 December 1971 at the age of fifty due to a mountain accident in Australia.

== Sources ==
- Bardakçı, Murat (2017). Neslishah: The Last Ottoman Princess. Oxford University Press. ISBN 978-9-774-16837-6.
- Milanlıoğlu, Neval (2011). Emine Naciye Sultan'ın Hayatı (1896-1957) (Postgraguate Thesis) (in Turkish). Marmara University Institute of Social Sciences.
- Sönmez, Cahi̇de (2014). "Sürgünden Vatana Osmanlı Hanedanının Geri Dönen İlk Üyeleri (1924-1951)". Tarihin Peşinde (in Turkish). 6 (12).
