= Hanzade Sultan (daughter of Şehzade Ömer Faruk) =

Ottoman princess

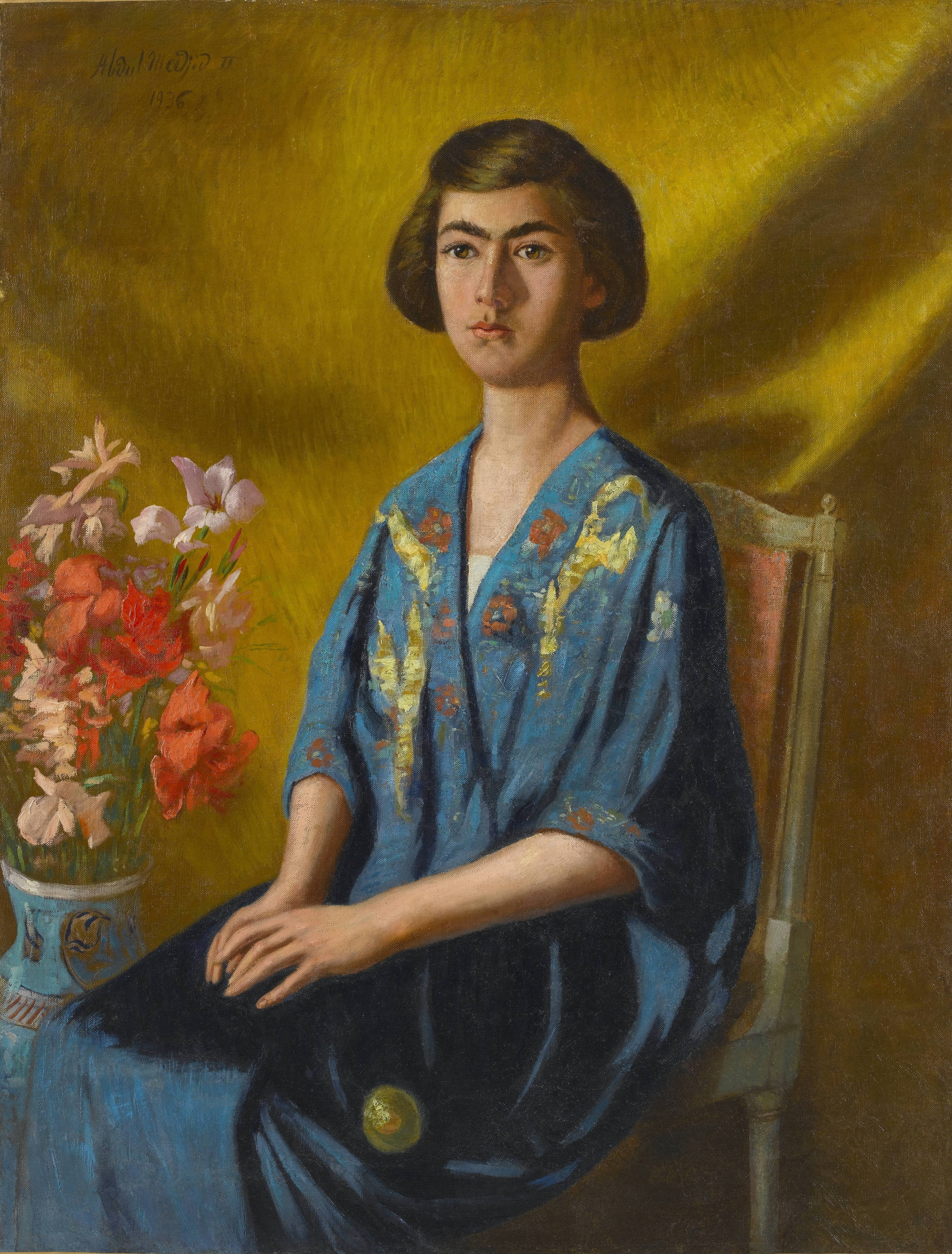
- Portrait of Hanzade Sultan by her grandfather Abdulmejid II, 1936
- Born: 19 September 1923; Dolmabahçe Palace, Istanbul, Turkey
- Died: 19 March 1998 (aged 74); Paris, France
- Burial: Aşiyan Asri Cemetery, Istanbul, Turkey
- Spouse: Damat Prince Muhammed Ali Ibrahim Pasha Beyefendi (m. 1940; died 1977)
- Issue: Sabiha Fazile Hanımsultan; Sultanzade Ahmed Rifat Bey
Names
- Turkish: Zehra Hanzade Sultan; Ottoman Turkish: زهرہ خان زاده سلطان
- Dynasty: Ottoman (by birth); Alawiyya (by marriage)
- Father: Şehzade Ömer Faruk
- Mother: Sabiha Sultan
- Religion: Sunni Islam

Zehra Hanzade Sultan (Ottoman Turkish: زهرہ خان زاده سلطان) called also Hanzade Osmanoğlu; 19 September 1923 – 19 March 1998) was an Ottoman princess, the daughter of Şehzade Ömer Faruk, the son of the last caliph, Abdulmejid II, and Şehsuvar Hanım. Her mother was Sabiha Sultan, daughter of Sultan Mehmed VI and Nazikeda Kadın.

== Early life ==
Zehra Hanzade Sultan was born on 19 September 1923 in the Dolmabahçe Palace, nearly a year after the abolition of the Ottoman Empire. Her father was Şehzade Ömer Faruk, and her mother was Sabiha Sultan. She had an elder sister, Neslişah Sultan, two years elder then her and a younger sister, Necla Sultan, four years younger than her. She was the paternal granddaughter of Abdulmejid II and Şehsuvar Kadın, and the maternal granddaughter of Sultan Mehmed VI and Nazikeda Kadın. She was considered the most beautiful princess in her generation.

A month after her birth, Turkey became a Republic on 29 October 1923. Upon the exile of the imperial family in March 1924, Hanzade her mother and sister left Turkey. Departing from the mansion in Rumelihisarı on 11 March, the three of them took the Orient Express to join her father and grandfather in Montreux, Switzerland. Although, the neutral Swiss government grew vary of the former Caliph residing in Switzerland, and they didn't want to have cold relations with the Turkish Republic. Seven months later, due to the high cost of living there, her parents, sisters and grandparents moved to Nice, France where she spent her childhood.

In Nice, they were enrolled in the public school where she and her sisters received their early education and were also taught English, French and German. The princesses received their religious education at home and were taught the Ottoman alphabet by Kamil Bey Kiligil, the second husband of Naciye Sultan, who taught the three princesses alongside his own stepchildren Mahpeyker Hanımsultan, Türkan Hanımsultan and Sultanzade Ali Bey, every Sunday.

Their grandfather, Abdulmejid used to take her and her sister Neslişah to the seashore on special occasions. In the fall of 1938, she arrived with her sister and father in Alexandria, Egypt, over fears of the breakout of another world war, whereas their grandfather moved to Paris.

== Marriage ==
In 1940, Prince Muhammad Abdel Moneim Pasha Beyefendi sent a proposal to Neslişah Sultan, as he was willing to marry her. Neslişah didn't agree and relations between her and her father got cold, following which she agreed. Hanzade's family was impoverished because of the ongoing World War II, as their grandfather Abdulmejid was unable to send them money from France. And because of this she wanted to marry, and get out of the situation immediately. However, her father disagreed and initially said "The eldest marries first, then the younger ones, let Neslişah then we will be thinking about Hanzade".

However, later, Faruk changed his mind and chose Prince Muhammed Ali Ibrahim Pasha Beyefendi as husband for her. The wedding took place in Cairo, and the family stayed at Aziza Hanım's home at Al-Qubba. Prince Muhammad Ali rented a large house in Gezira, which also had a library with beautifully bonded books. The wedding took place on Thursday, 19 September 1940, on her 17th birthday. In Egypt, Thursday was considered a felicitous day for marriage. The next week on Thursday, 26 September 1940 the wedding of Neslişah Sultan and Prince Abdel Moniem took place. He became a Damat.

The couple's first child Princess Sabiha Fazile Ibrahim Hanımsultan was born on 8 August 1941, who was born in Neuilly-sur-Seine. She was followed by Prince Sultanzade Ahmed Rifat Ibrahim, born on 31 August 1942. In 1958, King Faisal II of Iraq send a proposal for Fazile. The proposal was a surprise for her parents because Fazile was only sixteen and was studying in school. However, the marriage was not held because of the King's murder in the same year in the 14 July Revolution. Fazile later married Hayri Ürgüplü in Paris, France, on 10 December 1965, the son of Suat Hayri Ürgüplü, who served as Turkey's Prime Minister for seven months. Hanzade lived in Egypt until 1952, the Egyptian revolution of 1952 took place on 23 July 1952, and Egypt was proclaimed as a Republic, Hanzade and her family were exiled. At that moment they were in Paris, France, where they had lived for a few years and where they decided to stay and also hosted Hanzade's mother, Sabiha, for a few months. Hanzade spent her winter in Paris, and her summers in Kuşadası and Istanbul, she stayed at the Kuşadası Kısmet Hotel, which she ran alongside Halil Özbaş, the husband of her cousin Hümeyra Hanımsultan.

Hanzade's father, Ömer Faruk developed an increased interest in his cousin Mihrişah Sultan, the daughter of Crown Prince Şehzade Yusuf Izzeddin. It was also a public knowledge that things weren't going well between Faruk and her mother Sabiha. She and her sisters sided with their mother. Faruk accused Sabiha of turning their daughters against him. But he was already in love with Mihrişah and the issue of the council was just an excuse. In 1948, after twenty-eight years of marriage, Faruk divorced Sabiha, and married Mihrişah. Hanzade never accepted her father's second wife.

Hanzade was widowed at Prince Muhammad Ali's death in 1977.

== Death ==
Hanzade Sultan died on 19 March 1998 at the age of seventy-four in Paris, France. Her body was taken to Istanbul and her funeral prayers were performed after the Friday prayers on 27 March 1998 at the Bebek Mosque. She was buried in Aşiyan Asri Cemetery alongside her mother, Sabiha Sultan, she was the first among her sisters to pass away. Her daughter Fazile, died in 2024, and was buried next to her.

== Issue ==
By her marriage, Hanzade Sultan had a daughter and a son:

- Princess Sabiha Fazile Ibrahim Hanımsultan (8 August 1941 in Neuilly-sur-Seine, France – 27 September 2024 in Istanbul). She was asked in marriage by Faisal II of Iraq, but he died in a rebellion two weeks before the marriage. Later, she married and had two sons.
- Prince Sultanzade Ahmed Rifat Ibrahim Bey (31 August 1942 – 2 November 2011). Born in Cairo. On 26 June 1969 he married Emine Ushakligil, without issue.

== Sources ==
- Bardakçı, Murat (2017). Neslishah: The Last Ottoman Princess. Oxford University Press. ISBN 978-9-774-16837-6.
