= Münir Nurettin Selçuk =

Turkish classical musician and singer (c.1900–1981)

- Born: 1900 (disputed); Sarıyer, Istanbul, Ottoman Empire
- Died: April 27, 1981 Istanbul, Turkey
- Genre: Ottoman classical music
- Occupations: Singer, musician, actor
- Instruments: Vocals, tambur
- Years active: 1920–1981

Münir Nurettin Selçuk (1900 or 1901 – April 27, 1981) was a Turkish classical musician and tenor singer.

== Biography ==
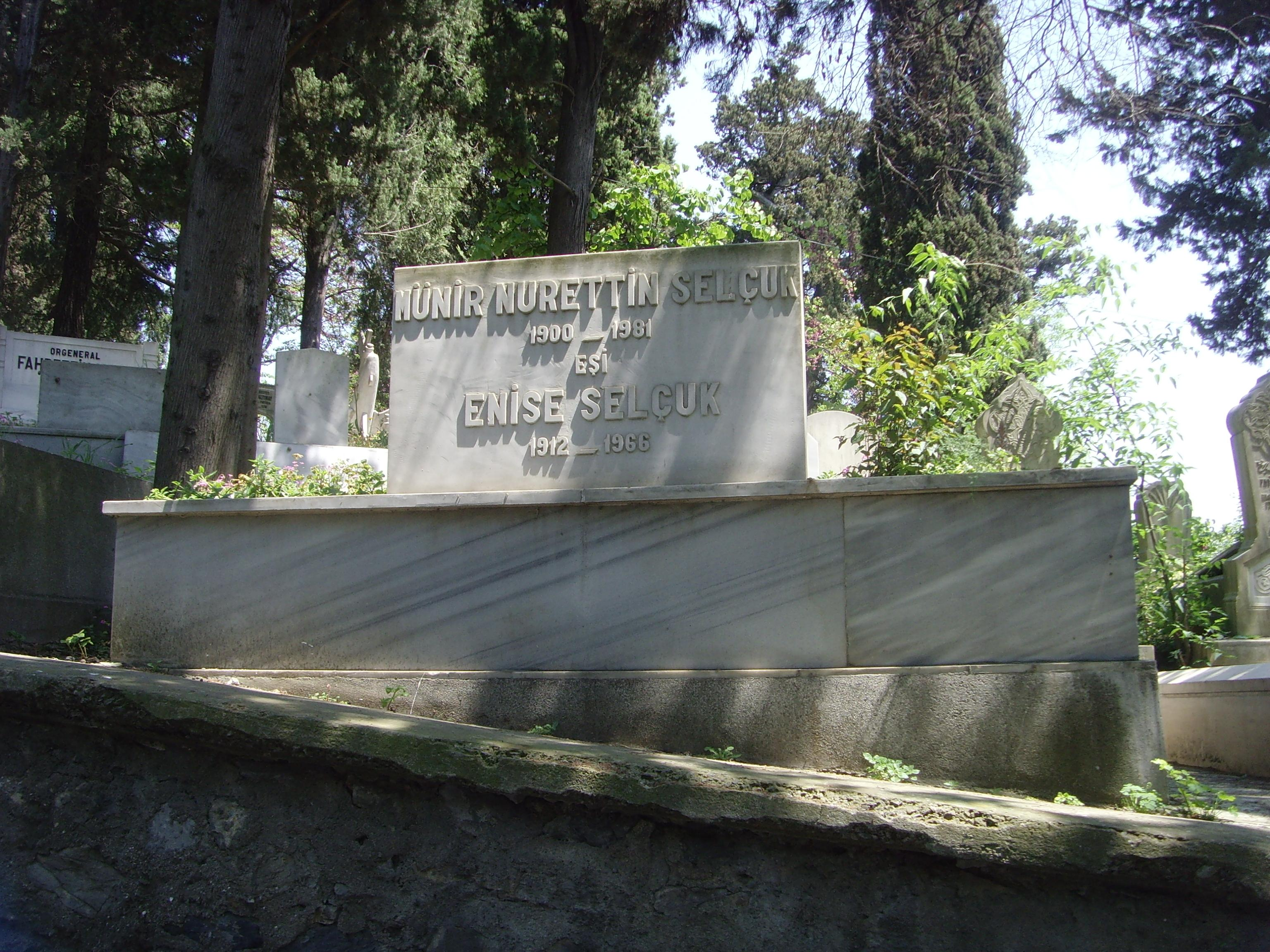
His grave in Aşiyan Asri Cemetery

He was born in the Sarıyer district of Istanbul in the Ottoman Empire in 1900 or 1901. His uncle was Grand Vizier of the Ottoman Empire, Abdurrahman Nurettin Pasha. As a young man, Selçuk studied in Hungary before returning to Turkey and becoming a musician. In 1927, he travelled to Paris for a musical education, then began working for the Istanbul Conservatory in 1953. He was the director of the Conservatory for a total of sixteen years.

Selçuk spent some time singing in stage musicals. One of Selçuk's most important legacies was the establishment of the position of lead singer in Turkish music. He died on April 27, 1981, and was buried at Aşiyan Asri Cemetery.

He had two sons, both of whom followed his footsteps into music, pianist composer Timur Selçuk, and jazz drummer composer Selim Selçuk.

== Works ==
He appeared in the films "Üçüncü Selim'in Gözdesi" (1950), "Hasret" (1944), "Kahveci Güzeli" (1941), "Allah'ın Cenneti" (1939), and "Laila" (1927), as well as composing for three films.
