= Şehzade Ömer Faruk =

Ottoman prince, son of Abdulmejid II

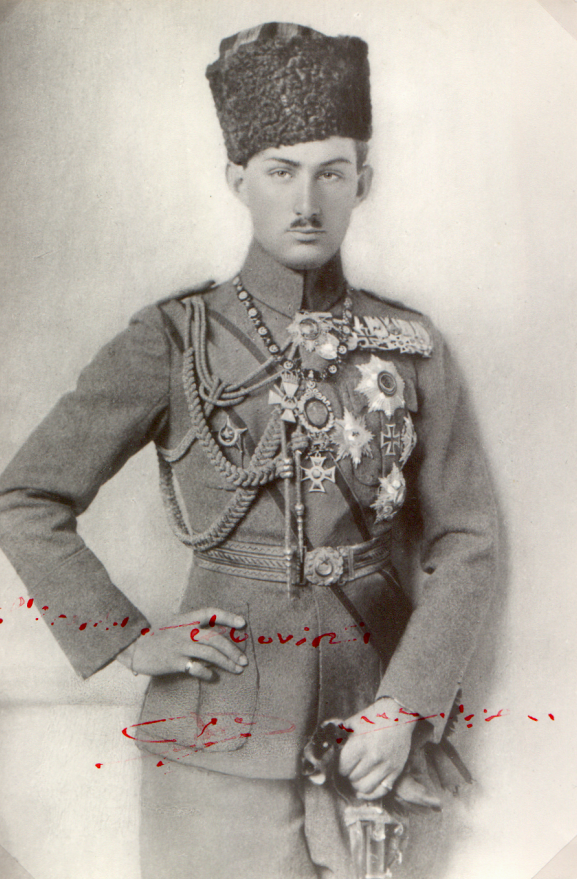

President of Fenerbahçe S.K.
- Term: 1920 – 1924
- Predecessor: İ. Refik A. Nuri Sekizinci
- Successor: Nasuhi Baydar
- Born: 27 February 1898; Ortaköy Palace, Constantinople, Ottoman Empire (now Istanbul, Turkey)
- Died: 28 March 1969 (aged 71); Maadi, Cairo, Egypt
- Burial: Mahmud II Mausoleum, Divanyolu, Istanbul
- Spouse: Rukiye Sabiha Sultan (m. 1920; div. 1948) Mihriban Mihrişah Sultan (m. 1948; div. 1959)
- Issue: by Sabiha; Fatma Neslişah Sultan; Zehra Hanzade Sultan; Necla Hibetullah Sultan
Names
- Turkish: Şehzade Ömer Faruk; Ottoman Turkish: شهزاده عمر فاروق
- Dynasty: Ottoman
- Father: Abdulmejid II
- Mother: Şehsuvar Hanım
- Religion: Sunni Islam
- Military career
- Allegiance: Ottoman Empire; German Empire
- Branch: Ottoman Army; Imperial German Army
- Service years: 1914–1922 (active service)
- Rank: See list

Şehzade Ömer Faruk Efendi (Ottoman Turkish: شهزادہ عمر فاروق; also Ömer Faruk Osmanoğlu; 27 February 1898 – 28 March 1969) was an Ottoman prince, the son of the last Ottoman caliph Abdulmejid II and his first consort Şehsuvar Hanım. He was also the son-in-law of Sultan Mehmed VI of the Ottoman Empire because he married his younger daughter Rukiye Sabiha Sultan.

== Early life ==
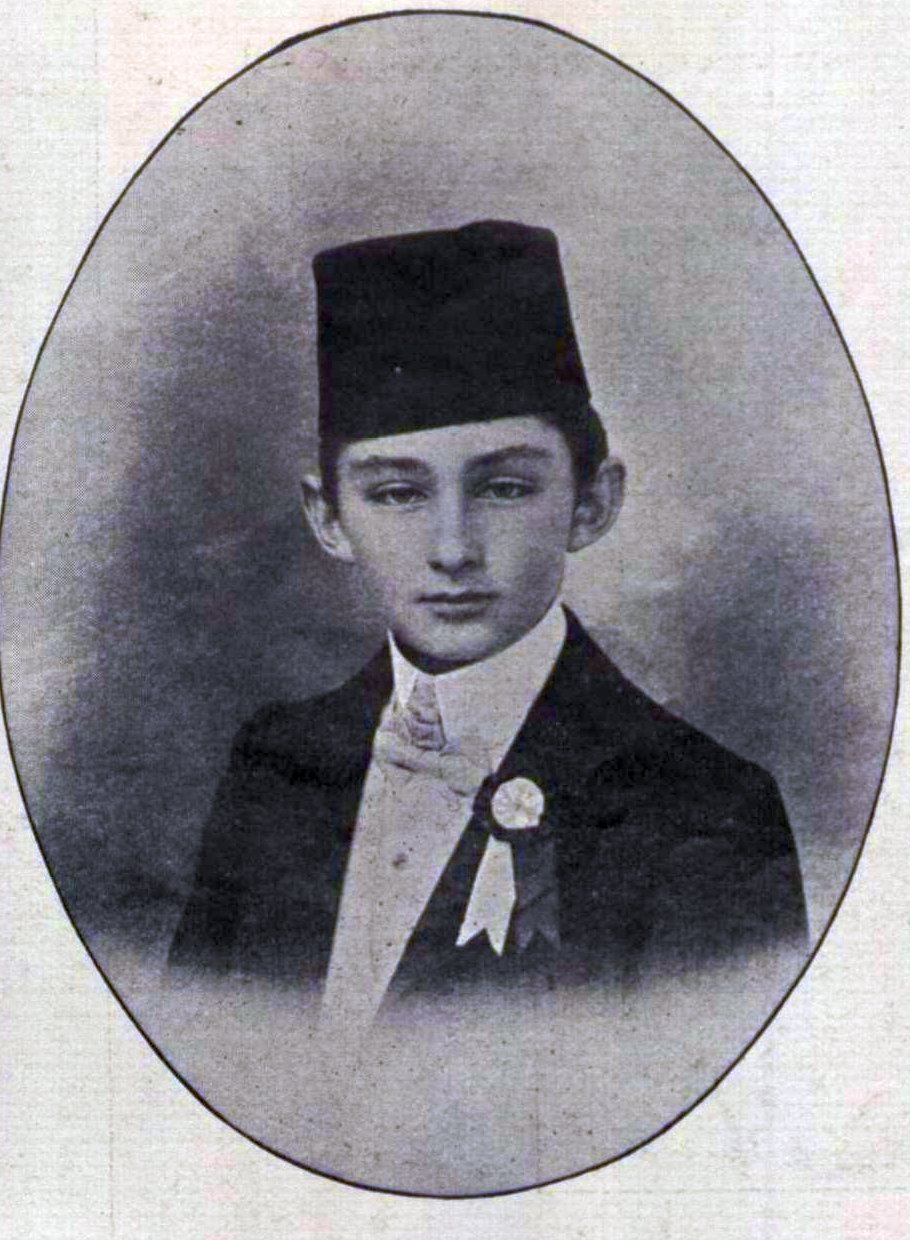
1909 portrait from Şehbal

Şehzade Ömer Faruk Efendi was born on 27 February 1898 in Ortaköy Palace. His father was Abdulmejid II, son of Sultan Abdulaziz and Hayranidil Kadın, and his mother was his first consort Şehsuvar Hanım. He had a younger half-sister Dürrüşehvar Sultan.

== Education ==
Ömer Faruk attended the Galatasaray High School. His father, Abdulmejid spoke French, and had a connection to the school through his close friend and relative Şehzade Ibrahim Tevfik. Ömer Faruk's application was prepared by Salih Keramet Bey, son Ottoman poet Nigar Hanım, who had given private lessons to the prince.

Ömer Faruk attended the school for a few years, until it was decided that he should have more serious vocational training, and at the age of eleven he was sent to Europe. He was to have a military education, as was common for princes at the time. He attended the school created by Empress Maria Theresa in Vienna in 1751, known as the Theresian Military Academy. Ömer Faruk spoke English, German, and French with a German accent. His German was as good as his Turkish.

After a visit to the Chamber of the Blessed Mantle in the Topkapı Palace, where lengthy prayers were said, he made his way to Vienna. Salih Keramet Bey accompanied him, and settled him into the academy. He spent several years there, undergoing military training that also included extracurricular courses in basket-weaving, carpentry, masonry, construction works, metalworking, and other manual skills. But for more rigorous, iron-fisted, and disciplined training, Ömer Faruk was transferred from Vienna to Potsdam Military Academy in Prussia. The transfer was the idea of Enver Pasha, the Young Turk Ottoman War Minister.

Enver Pasha thought young princes should receive a military education, and for this purpose he allocated the Palace of Ihlamur as the Princes School. It became compulsory for all princes below the age of fifteen to attend this school. Here, besides their military training, they were taught literature, history, religion, mathematics, and geometry. Ömer Faruk and Abdulmejid I's grandson Şehzade Mehmed Şerefeddin, the brother of Enver Pasha's wife, Naciye Sultan, were transferred to Germany for military training. The Ministry of War issued a decree for the education of the two princes.

== Military career ==
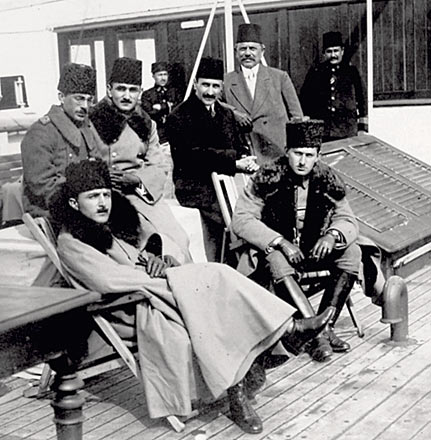
Ömer Faruk and Enver Pasha on board a ship to the Gallipoli front

Ömer Faruk graduated from the Prussian Military Academy in Potsdam as a professional Prussian officer. His demeanour reflected his strict German education, and until his death he remained a severe soldier but only in appearance, as deep down he was a romantic at heart, and he never gave up his Ottoman habits.

During the First World War, Ömer Faruk fought for the Germans. The prince was sent to Galicia, and from there to Verdun, where he was assigned to the battlefield and where the battles with the French were quite bloody. He fought like a professional soldier, and Kaiser Wilhelm II granted him first the Red Eagle medal, then the Iron Cross of the First Degree. The Kaiser sent a golden cigarette case, as well as a signed photograph of himself together with the medal.

When the Germans lost the Battle of Verdun, Ömer Faruk returned to Potsdam, where he was appointed to the German emperor's First Foot Guards Regiment. The two requirements for enrollment in this regiment were that one must belong to one of the most aristocratic families in Germany and be taller than 1.9 meters. Every Prussian prince was registered as an officer in this regiment from the age of ten, but those short in height would not take part in the parades. The prince was accepted into the regiment despite being only 1.85 meters tall. He was the shortest among his colleagues, yet he took part in all the parades in front of the kaiser.

By 1918, he was serving as honorary aide-de-camp to Sultan Mehmed VI. He was also serving as first lieutenant in the infantry of the Ottoman army and saw action in the Caucasus campaign and the Sinai and Palestine campaign.

During the Turkish War of Independence, he attempted to defect to the nationalist movement after his father's residence (Dolmabahçe Palace) was put under siege, and according to his wife Sabiha Sultan, knew of Mustafa Kemal's invitation to Abdul Mejid to be the face of the nationalists. Hearing his father demure from the invitation, Faruk's patriotism made him angry and he declared, "Then I will go and fight under Mustafa Kemal's command as a private." When his daughter Neslişah Sultan was just two months old, on 26 April 1921 he smuggled himself, with the help of Yümni Üresin, aboard a steamer and landed at İnebolu, after which he received a telegram from Mustafa Kemal rebuffing his defection and ordering him back to the capital, with the reason that he did not want members of the imperial family being involved in the conflict. Sabiha delivered his defection letter to her father, Mehmed VI, who wasn't surprised of his defection. Faruk returned to the capital and faced no punishment. He developed severe claustrophobia afterwords, as he was hidden in a small iron compartment in the ship for several hours, and contemplated suicide with the pistol he took during a British inspection of the ship. Years later, he learned the true reason his service was rejected by Ankara was due to suspicions of him being a British agent. Even though Kemal would expel the Osmanoğlu family, Faruk had no hard feelings for Mustafa Kemal. Abroad, he framed and hung Kemal's rejection telegram to him in a prominent place in his apartment.

== Personal life ==
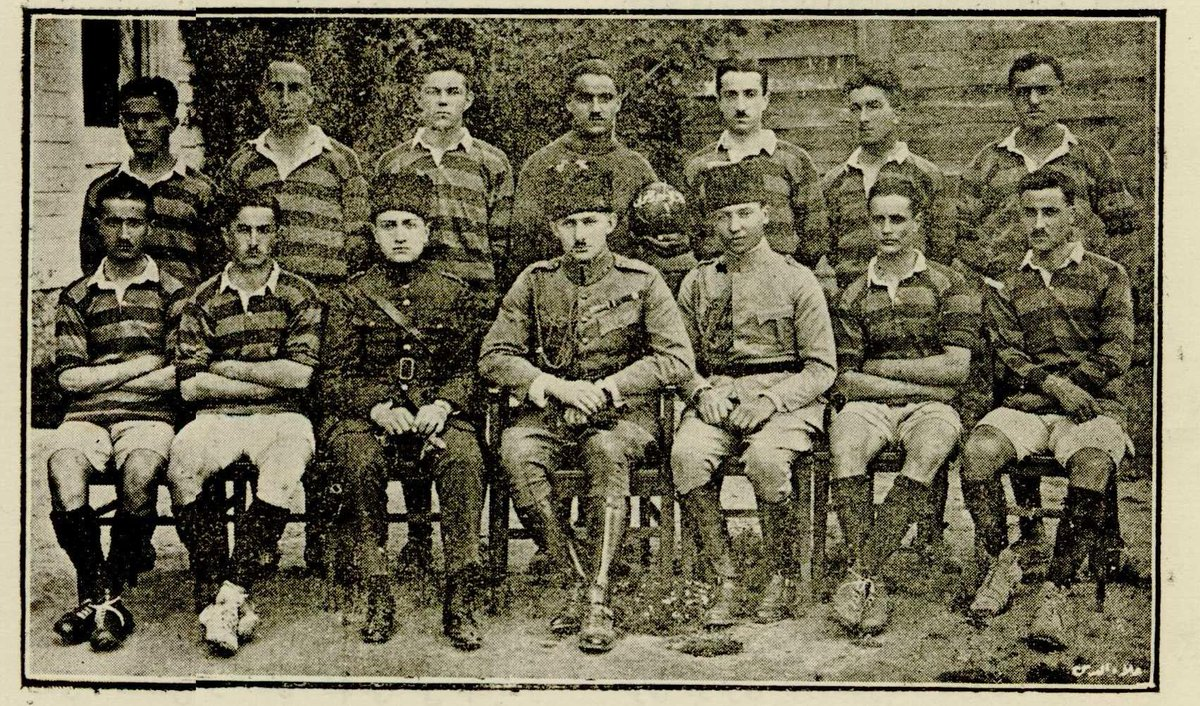
Ömer Faruk and Ali Vasıb with the Fenerbahce football team, which completed the 1922-23 season as undefeated champions

In 1919, a prospective bride was proposed for Faruk. Emine Dürriye Hanım was the daughter of Mahmud Muhtar Pasha and his wife, the Egyptian princess Nimetullah, the daughter of Khedive Isma'il Pasha. Mahmud Mukhtar himself proposed the marriage. However, Faruk declined the proposal. Between 1919 and 1924, he served as president of the Fenerbahçe Sports Club.

=== First marriage ===
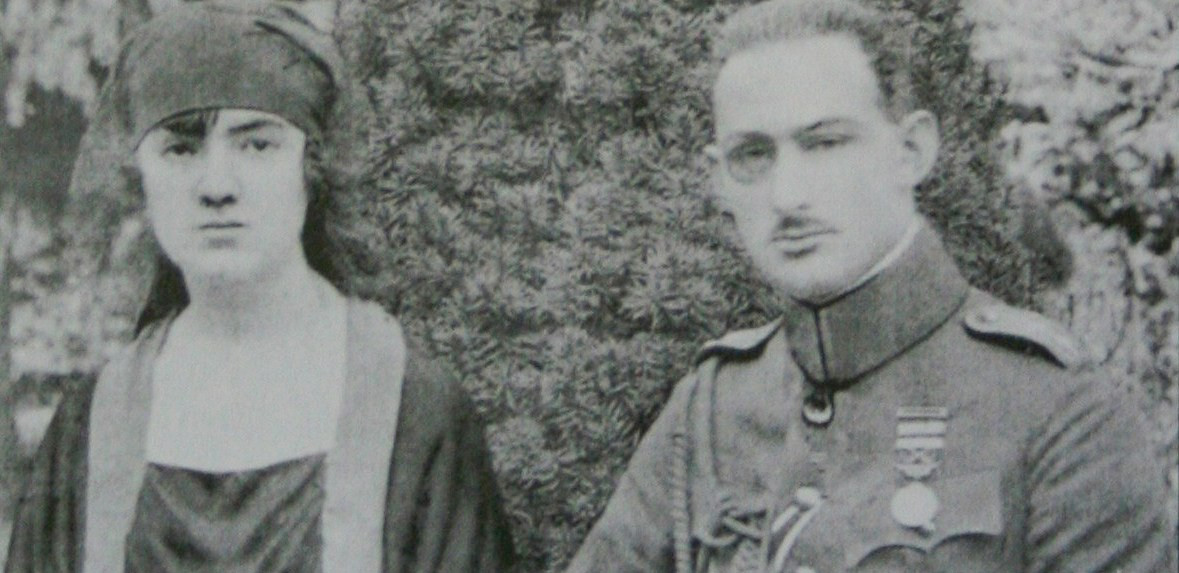
Sabiha and her husband, Ömer Faruk, around their wedding, 1920

Ömer Faruk and Sabiha Sultan, the daughter of Mehmed VI Vahdeddin and Nazikeda Kadın, were in love with each other. Many people, including Mustafa Kemal Atatürk, had wanted to marry Sabiha Sultan, but she had refused all suitors. When Abdulmejid asked Sabiha's hand in marriage for his son, Mehmed flatly refused because between the descendants of Abdülmecid I as Mehmed VI and those of Abdülaziz as Abdülmecid II there were disagreements, due to the controversial deposition and death of Abdülaziz: Abdülaziz's family believed that he was killed in a plot hatched in favor of sons of Abdülmecid I (Murad V, Abdülhamid II, Mehmed V, Mehmed VI). His mother Şehsuvar, called on Sabiha's mother Nazikeda Kadın, and succeeded in convincing her.

The marriage took place on 20 April 1920, in the pavilion of the sacred relics, Topkapı Palace. The marriage was performed by Şeyhülislam Hayrizade Ibrahim Efendi. Sabiha Sultan's deputy was Başkatip Ali Fuad Bey, and Ömer Faruk's deputy was Ömer Yaver Pasha. Faruk's witnesses were İsmail Hakkı Pasha and Mehmed VI's chamberlain Naci (Eldeniz). The wedding reception took place at the Yıldız Palace.

In May 1920, ten days after their wedding, Faruk and Sabiha moved to a mansion in Rumelihisarı gifted to them by Sultan Vahdeddin, the Zeki Pasha Palace. In October of the same year, the Sultan bought two houses for his daughters in Nişantaşı. The mansions were known as the Twin Palaces. He gave one house to Ulviye Sultan, and the other to Sabiha. Faruk and Sabiha decided to live in Nişantaşı during the winter and Rumelihisarı in the summer.

=== Issue and exile ===
The couple's eldest daughter, Fatma Neslişah Sultan was born on 2 February 1921 in the Nişantaşı Palace. She was followed two years later by Zehra Hanzade Sultan, born on 12 September 1923 in the Dolmabahçe Palace.

At the exile of the imperial family in March 1924, Ömer Faruk and his wife and daughters and his parents firstly settled in Switzerland, when Faruk and his father were when they received the sentence of exile. Later they moved to Nice, where her youngest daughter Necla Hibetullah Sultan was born on 16 May 1926.

In 1930, Şehzade Ibrahim Tevfik, now penniless, and his family, came to live in Nice in a small cottage in a village nearby with his family. He then moved with his youngest daughter Fevziye Sultan in with his cousin Sabiha and Ömer Faruk, where he died in 1931. Fevziye came back to live with her mother.

Sabiha's mother also used to come for a stay at Nice with them. A large room used to be assigned to her, which she shared with Şehzade Mehmed Ertuğrul, her stepson, whenever he came back from Grasse. In 1938, they moved to Alexandria when Nazikeda died.

In 1940, he attended the wedding of her daughter, Neslişah Sultan and Prince Mohamed Abdel Moneim, son of Egypt's last khedive Abbas Hilmi II. His two other daughters, Hanzade Sultan, and Necla Sultan also married Egyptian princes, Mehmed Ali Ibrahim in 1940, and Amr Ibrahim in 1943 respectively.

=== Divorce and second marriage ===
Ömer Faruk developed an increased interest in his cousin Mihrişah Sultan, the daughter of crown prince Şehzade Yusuf Izzeddin. It was also a public knowledge that things weren't going well between Faruk and Sabiha.

In 1944, Mihrişah even sided with Faruk when the council chose Prince Ahmed Nihad as the head of the family. While Sabiha backed the council's decision and approved the choice of the leader. Her daughters also sided with her. Faruk accused Sabiha of turning their daughters against him. But he was already in love with Mihrişah and the issue of the council was just an excuse.

Faruk divorced Sabiha on 5 March 1948, after twenty eight years of marriage, and just four months later married Mihrişah in a religious ceremony on 31 July 1948. In the prenuptial agreement she asked that the right to divorce her husband be included in the contract. His remarriage created a rift with his daughters, who sided with their mother and treated their father coldly for years, as well as not recognizing or having contact with Mihrişah.

However, their marriage did not last and in 1959 Mihrişah divorced Faruk using her right to divorce her husband. Later Faruk would tell his friends "I divorced the most beautiful woman in the world to marry the ugliest one. Fate!"

== Death ==
Ömer Faruk died on 28 March 1969 in Cairo, Egypt. His body was taken back to Istanbul, and was buried in the mausoleum of Sultan Mahmud II.

== Honours ==
Styles of Şehzade Ömer Faruk
- Reference style: His Imperial Highness
- Spoken style: Your Imperial Highness

Ottoman honours

- Order of the House of Osman, Jeweled
- Order of Osmanieh, 1st Class
- Order of the Medjidie, 1st Class
- Imtiyaz War Medal in Silver
- Hicaz Demiryolu Medal in Gold
- Iftikhar Sanayi Medal
- Gallipoli Star
- Liakat War Medal in Silver

Foreign honours

- Austria-Hungary: Grand-Cross Order of Leopold, 6 June 1918
- Germany:
  - Order of the Iron Cross
  - Order of the Red Eagle, 1st Class

=== Military appointments ===
==== Military ranks and army appointments ====
- 1914: Prussian Officer, German Army
- c. 1918: First Lieutenant of Infantry, Ottoman Army

==== Honorary appointments ====
- c. 1918: Aide-de-Camp to the Sultan

== Issue ==
Name	Birth	Death	Notes
Fatma Neslişah Sultan	2 February 1921	2 April 2012	Married once, and had issue, a son, and a daughter; died in Istanbul, Turkey
Zehra Hanzade Sultan	12 September 1923	19 March 1998	Married once, and had issue, a son and a daughter; died in Paris, France
Necla Hibetullah Sultan	16 May 1926	6 October 2006	Born in Nice, France; married once, and had issue, a son; died in Madrid, Spain

== Sources ==
- Sakaoğlu, Necdet (2008). Bu mülkün kadın sultanları: Vâlide sultanlar, hâtunlar, hasekiler, kadınefendiler, sultanefendiler. Oğlak Yayıncılık. ISBN 978-9-753-29623-6.
- Bardakçı, Murat (2017). Neslishah: The Last Ottoman Princess. Oxford University Press. ISBN 978-9-774-16837-6.
- Bardakçı, Murat (1998). Şahbaba: Osmanoğulları'nın Son Hükümdarı Vahdettin'in Hayatı, Hatıraları ve Özel Mektupları. Pan Yayıncılık-İnkılâp Kitabevi. ISBN 9751024536.
- Açba, Leyla (2004). Bir Çerkes prensesinin harem hatıraları. L & M. ISBN 978-9-756-49131-7.
