= Mahpeyker Hanımsultan =

Ottoman princess, daughter of Naciye Sultan and Enver Pasha

- Born: 17 May 1917; Kuruçeşme Palace, Istanbul, Ottoman Empire (now Istanbul, Turkey)
- Died: 3 April 2000 (aged 82); Istanbul, Turkey
- Burial: 6 April 2000; Zincirlikuyu Cemetery
- Spouse: Fikret Ürgüp (m. 1946; div. 1968)
- Issue: Hasan Ürgüp
Names
- Turkish: Mahpeyker Hanımsultan; Ottoman Turkish: ماہ پیکر خانم سلطان
- Father: Ismail Enver Pasha
- Mother: Naciye Sultan
- Religion: Sunni Islam

Mahpeyker Hanımsultan (Ottoman Turkish: ماہ پیکر خانم سلطان; 17 May 1917 – 3 April 2000) also Mahpeyker Enver or Mahpeyker Ürgüp, was an Ottoman princess, the daughter of Naciye Sultan and Enver Pasha.

== Biography ==
Mahpeyker Hanımsultan was born on 17 May 1917 in the Kuruçeşme Palace. Her father was Ismail Enver Pasha, son of Ahmed Bey and Ayşe Dilara Hanım, and her mother was Naciye Sultan, daughter of Şehzade Selim Süleyman and Ayşe Tarzıter Hanım. She had a young sister, Türkan Hanımsultan and a younger brother, Sultanzade Ali Bey. She had a younger maternal half-sister, Rana Hanımsultan, from her mother's second marriage to Kamil Bey, younger brother of Mahpeyker's father.

In 1920, during her father's stay in Berlin, Mahpeyker, her mother and sister Türkan joined him. When Enver left for Soviet Russia his family remained there. After his death in 1922, they returned to Istanbul. Upon the exile of the imperial family in March 1924, Mahpeyker and her family settled in Paris, France, and later in Nice. During the exile, Mahpeyker was educated along with her siblings by her uncle, and stepfather Kamil Pasha. Kamil Pasha taught them to read and write old Turkish alphabet along with princesses Neslişah Sultan, Hanzade Sultan and Necla Sultan on every Sunday.

In 1931, Sultan Abdulmejid II arranged marriage of his only daughter, Dürrüşehvar Sultan to Azam Jah, elder son and heir to Mir Osman Ali Khan, Nizam of Hyderabad, and Mahpeyker to Moazzam Jah, younger brother of Azam Jah. According to some sources, the Nizam was trying hard to obtain the hand of her cousin, Dürrüşehvar, for his eldest son. Unhappy with the high mahr demanded by her family, he finally settled for a second Ottoman bride to be included in the deal. However, Şehzade Osman Fuad and his wife, the Egyptian princess Kerime Hanım, wanted the Nizam's younger son to marry their niece Nilüfer Hanımsultan, whom they had prepared to marry someone rich. They dressed her up, made her look pretty, and introduced her to Muazzam Jah. Nilüfer, who was then a ravishing beauty, was so attractive that Mahpeyker could not compare. When Muazzam Jah saw her he completely forgot about Mahpeyker, and insisted on marrying Nilüfer.

In 1939, a special law was passed, allowing the return to Turkey of Mahpeyker and her siblings, after which they settled in Istanbul. With the Second World War raging, she, her mother and sisters, settled in Switzerland until 1943. She studied to become a doctor and specialized in psychiatry. In 1946, she married Fikret Ürgüp, a doctor. They had a son named Hasan, born in 1948. Mahpeyker and her husband worked as psychiatrists from 1954 to 1959 in the United States, from 1959 to 1961 in England, and returned to Turkey in 1961.

Mahpeyker died at the age of eighty-two on 3 April 2000 in Istanbul. Her funeral took place on 6 April at the Galip Paşa Mosque in Erenköy, and was attended by the members of the Ottoman dynasty. She was buried in Zincirlikuyu cemetery.

== Issue ==
Name	Birth	Death	Notes
Hasan Ürgüp	1948	12 November 1989	Died unmarried and without issue; Buried in Istanbul;

== Sources ==
- Bardakçı, Murat (2017). Neslishah: The Last Ottoman Princess. Oxford University Press. ISBN 978-9-774-16837-6.
- Milanlıoğlu, Neval (2011). Emine Naciye Sultan'ın Hayatı (1896-1957) (Postgraguate Thesis) (in Turkish). Marmara University Institute of Social Sciences.
- Sönmez, Cahi̇de (2014). "Sürgünden Vatana Osmanlı Hanedanının Geri Dönen İlk Üyeleri (1924-1951)". Tarihin Peşinde (in Turkish). 6 (12).
