= Rana Hanımsultan =

Ottoman princess (1926–2008)

- Born: 25 February 1926; Paris, French Third Republic
- Died: 14 April 2008 (aged 82); Istanbul, Turkey
- Burial: 17 April 2008; Yahya Efendi Mausoleum, Beşiktaş, Istanbul
- Spouse: Sadi Eldem (m. 1949; died 1995)
- Issue: Ceyda Eldem; Necla Eldem; Edhem Elden
- Dynasty: Ottoman
- Father: Mehmet Kamil Killigil
- Mother: Naciye Sultan
- Education: Sorbonne University

Rana Hanımsultan, also known as Rana Eldem, (25 February 1926 – 14 April 2008) was an Ottoman princess and a French teacher. She was the daughter of Naciye Sultan, and Mehmet Kamil Killigil.

== Early life and education ==
Rana Hanımsultan was born in Paris, France, on 25 February 1926. Her parents were Naciye Sultan, daughter of Şehzade Selim Süleyman and granddaughter of Ottoman Sultan Abdulmejid I, and Mehmet Kamil Killigil, younger brother of Naciye Sultan's former husband Enver Pasha. They married in 1923, one year after the death of Enver Pasha, and settled in Paris. She had three older maternal half-siblings: Mahpeyker Hanımsultan, Türkan Hanimsultan and Sultanzade Ali Bey.

A special law was passed for her and her half-siblings to return to Turkey on 25 May 1939. They all became citizens of the Republic of Turkey through a law dated 5 July 1939. Rana's parents divorced in 1949, and her father returned to Turkey and became a Turkish citizen through a law dated 22 September 1949. He died in Istanbul on 7 August 1962.

During World War II Rana Hanımsultan and her older sisters stayed with their mother in Switzerland until 1943. She completed her high secondary education there. In 1946 Rana and her parents returned to Paris. She was educated at Sorbonne University, receiving a degree in French language and literature.

== Career and activities ==
Rana Hanımsultan worked as a French language teacher. She taught at Lycée Saint-Joseph in Istanbul between 1985 and 1986.

== Death ==
Rana Hanımsultan died in Istanbul on 14 April 2008 shortly after she had fallen down the stairs at her Istanbul home on 13 April and had experienced a cerebral hemorrhage. Funeral prayers for her were performed at Teşvikiye Mosque on 17 April with the attendance of the members of the Ottoman dynasty. She was buried next to her mother, Naciye Sultan, her husband, her daughter, Necla, and other relatives in Yahya Efendi Mausoleum in Beşiktaş, Istanbul.

== Issue ==
Rana Hanımsultan married a Turkish diplomat, Sadi Eldem, on 25 July 1949. Her mother, Naciye Sultan, could return to Turkey on 4 August 1952 and stayed at their home in Istanbul for a while. Sadi Eldem died on 15 January 1995. They had three children, two daughters and a son:

- Ceyda Eldem (1 March 1952 - August 2014)
- Necla Eldem (24 March 1954 - 24 August 1964). She died in an accident at age ten.
- Edhem Eldem (born 2 March 1960) who works as historian and faculty member at Boğaziçi University. On 2 September 1983 he married Zeynep Sedef Torunoglu, and they have a daughter, Simin Eldem.
