= Sadi Eldem =

Turkish diplomat (1910–1995)

Ambassador of Turkey to Iran
- In office 27 November 1972 – 10 April 1975
- Preceded by: Namık Yolga
- Succeeded by: Rahmi Gümrükçüoğlu

Ambassador of Turkey to Spain
- In office 1967–1972
- Succeeded by: Zeki Kuneralp

Ambassador of Turkey to Syria
- In office 1965–1965

Personal details
- Born: 10 April 1910 Marseille, France
- Died: 15 January 1995 (aged 84) Istanbul, Turkey
- Resting place: Yahya Efendi Mausoleum, Beşiktaş, Istanbul
- Spouse: Rana Hanımsultan (m. 1949)
- Children: Ceyda; Necla; Edhem
- Education: Istanbul University; University of Paris

Osman Sadi Eldem (1910–1995) was a Turkish diplomat and served as the ambassador of Turkey to Spain between 1969 and 1972 and then to Iran from 1972 to 1975.

== Early life and education ==
Sadi was born in Marseille, France, on 10 April 1910. He was the youngest child of İsmail Hakkı and Azize Hanım. İsmail Hakkı was serving as the consul general of the Ottoman Empire in Marseille when he was born. His mother, Azize Hanım, was the granddaughter of the Ottoman statesman and Grand vizier Ibrahim Edhem Pasha.

Sadi graduated from Galatasaray High School and received a degree in law from Istanbul University. He held a PhD degree in law from the University of Paris in 1940. His thesis was published with the title Le statut des magistrats (Recrutement).

== Career ==
Eldem joined the Ministry of Foreign Affairs in 1940 where he worked at different positions. He was named as the ambassador of Turkey to Syria in 1965 and served in the post for one year. He was appointed undersecretary of the ministry on 7 September 1967 which he held until 1969 when he was made the ambassador of Turkey to Spain. Eldem's term ended in 1972, and Zeki Kuneralp was appointed to the post on 27 October 1972. Eldem replaced Namık Yolga as the ambassador of Turkey to Iran on 27 November 1972. Eldem was in office until his retirement on 10 April 1975, and Rahmi Gümrükçüoğlu succeeded him in the post.

== Personal life and death ==
Eldem married a daughter of Ottoman princess Naciye Sultan, Rana Hanımsultan, on 25 July 1949. They had three children, two daughters and a son. Their secondborn, Necla born on 24 March 1654 and died at age 10 in an accident on 24 August 1964. Their eldest daughter, Ceyda, was born on 1 March 1954 and died in Istanbul at age 60 in August 2014. Their son, Edhem Eldem (born 2 March 1960), is a historian and academic working at Boğaziçi University. On 2 September 1983 he married Zeynep Sedef Torunoglu, and they had a daughter, Simin Eldem (born on 2 January 1987).

Eldem died in Istanbul on 15 January 1995. He was buried next to his daughter, Necla, and in-laws in Yahya Efendi Mausoleum in Beşiktaş, Istanbul.
