= List of Mamluk titles and appellations =

English	Arabic	Notes
Alama Sultaniya	علامة سلطانية	The mark or signature of the Sultan put on his decrees, letters and documents.
Al-Nafir al-Am	النفير العام	General emergency declared during war
Amir	أمير	Commander
Amir Akhur	أمير آخور	supervisor of the royal stable (from Persian آخور meaning stable)
Amir Majlis	أمير مجلس	Guard of Sultan's seat and bed
Atabek	أتابك	Commander in chief (literally "father-lord," originally meaning an appointed step-father for a non-Mamluk minor prince)
Astadar	أستادار	Chief of the royal servants
Barid Jawi	بريد جوى	Airmail (mail sent by carrier-pigeons, amplified by Sultan Baibars)
Bayt al-Mal	بيت المال	treasury
Cheshmeh	ششمه	A pool of water, or fountain (literally "eye"), from Persian چشمه
Dawadar	دوادار	Holder of Sultan's ink bottle (from Persian دوات‌دار meaning bearer of the ink bottle)
Fondok	فندق	Hotel (some famous hotels in Cairo during the Mamluk era were Dar al-Tofah, Fondok Bilal and Fondok al-Salih)
Hajib	حاجب	Doorkeeper of sultan's court
Iqta	إقطاع	Revenue from land allotment
Jamkiya	جامكية	Salary paid to a Mamluk
Jashnakir	جاشنكير	Food taster of the sultan (to assure his food and drink was not poisoned)
Jomdar	جمدار	An official at the department of the Sultan's clothing (from Persian جامه‌دار, meaning keeper of cloths)
Kafel al-mamalek al-sharifah al-islamiya al-amir al-amri	كافل الممالك الشريفة الاسلامية الأمير الأمرى	Title of the Vice-sultan (Guardian of the Prince of Command [lit. Commander-in-command] of the Dignified Islamic Kingdoms)
Khan	خان	A store that specialized in selling a certain commodity
Khaskiya	خاصكية	Courtiers of the sultan and most trusted royal mamluks who functioned as the Sultan's bodyguards/ A privileged group around a prominent Amir (from Persian خاصگیان, meaning close associates)
Khastakhaneh	خاصتاخانة	Hospital (from Ottoman Turkish خسته‌خانه, from Persian)
Khond	خند	Wife of the sultan
Khushdashiya	خشداشية	Mamluks belonging to the same Amir or Sultan.
Mahkamat al-Mazalim	محكمة المظالم	Court of complaint. A court that heard cases of complaints of people against state officials. This court was headed by the sultan himself.
Mamalik Kitabeya	مماليك كتابية	Mamluks still attending training classes and who still live at the Tebaq (campus)
Mamalik Sultaneya	مماليك سلطانية	Mamluks of the sultan;to distinguish from the Mamluks of the Amirs (princes)
Modwarat al-Sultan	مدورة السلطان	Sultan's tent which he used during travel.
Mohtaseb	محتسب	Controller of markets, public works and local affairs.
Morqadar	مرقدار	Works in the Royal Kitchen (from Persian مرغ‌دار meaning one responsible for the fowl)
Mushrif	مشرف	Supervisor of the Royal Kitchen
Na'ib Al-Sultan	نائب السلطان	Vice-sultan
Qa'at al-insha'a	قاعة الإنشاء	Chancery hall
Qadi al-Qoda	قاضى القضاة	Chief justice
Qalat al-Jabal	قلعة الجبل	Citadel of the Mountain (the abode and court of the sultan in Cairo)
Qaranisa	قرانصة	Mamluks who moved to the service of a new Sultan or from the service of an Amir to a sultan.
Qussad	قصاد	Secret couriers and agents who kept the sultan informed
Ostaz	أستاذ	Benefactor of Mamluks (the Sultan or the Emir) (from Persian استاد)
Rank	رنك	An emblem that distinguished the rank and position of a Mamluk (probably from Persian رنگ meaning color)
Sanjaqi	سنجاقى	A standard-bearer of the Sultan.
Sharabkhana	شرابخانة	Storehouse for drinks, medicines and glass-wares of the sultan. (from Persian شراب‌خانه meaning wine cellar)
Silihdar	سلحدار	Arm-Bearer (from Arabic سلاح + Persian دار, meaning arm-bearer)
Tabalkhana	طبلخانه	The amir responsible for the Mamluk military band, from Persian طبل‌خانه
Tashrif	تشريف	Head-covering worn by a Mamluk during the ceremony of inauguration to the position of Amir.
Tawashi	طواشى	A Eunuch responsible for serving the wives of the sultan and supervising new Mamluks. Mamluk writers seem not to have consulted the eunuchs themselves about "their origins.
Tebaq	طباق	Campus of the Mamluks at the citadel of the mountain
Tishtkhana	طشتخانة	Storehouse used for the laundry of the sultan (from Persian تشت‌خانه, meaning tub room)
Wali	والى	viceroy
Yuq	يوق	A large linen closet used in every mamluk home, which stored pillows and sheets. (Related to the present Crimean Tatar word Yuqa, "to sleep". In modern Turkish: Yüklük.)
