= Aşiyan Asri Cemetery =

Cemetery in Istanbul, Turkey

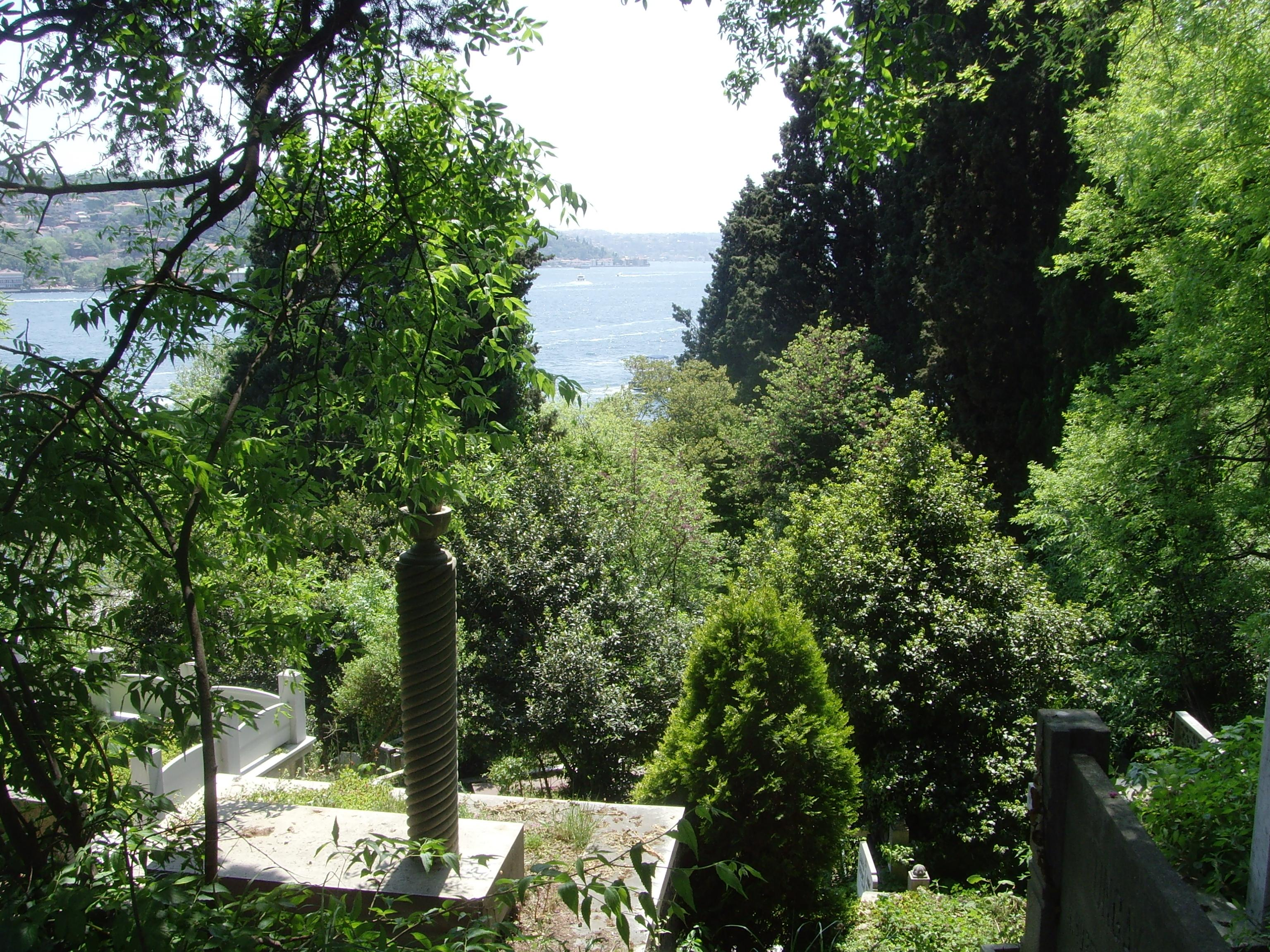
- The Bosporus from Aşiyan Asri Cemetery
- Interactive map of Aşiyan Asri Cemetery

Details
- Location: Bebek, Istanbul
- Country: Turkey
- Coordinates: 41°04′57″N 29°03′19″E
- Type: Public
- Owned by: Istanbul Metropolitan Municipality
- Website: İBB Mezarlıklar Md. website

The Aşiyan Asri Cemetery (Turkish: Aşiyan Asri Mezarlığı) is a burial ground situated on Aşiyan between the Bebek and Rumelihisarı neighborhoods of the European part of Istanbul, Turkey.

This small cemetery, which has a panoramic view of the Bosporus, is the final resting place of many renowned intellectuals, writers and artists.

== Notable burials ==
Listed in ascending order:

=== 19th century ===
- Ahmet Vefik Paşa (1823–1891), grand vezir, historian, linguist

=== 20th century ===
- Tevfik Fikret (1867–1915), poet
- Nigâr Hanım (1856–1918), poet
- Ziya Songülen (1886–1936), founder and first president of Fenerbahçe Sports Club
- Ömer Fahreddin Pasha (1868–1948), Ottoman military leader and governor of Medina
- Orhan Veli Kanık (1914–1950), poet
- Yahya Kemal Beyatlı (1884–1958), poet
- Ahmet Hamdi Tanpınar (1901–1962), novelist
- Ulviye Sultan (1892–1967), Ottoman princess
- Rukiye Sabiha Sultan (1894–1971), third daughter of Ottoman Empire's last sultan Mehmed VI and his first wife Nazikeda Kadın
- Adalet Cimcoz (1910–1970), voice actress, art curator, critic, translator, gossip columnist
- Hilmi Ziya Ülken (1901–1974), scholar and writer
- Tevfik Rüştü Aras (1883–1972) Minister of Foreign Affairs and diplomat
- Gündüz Kılıç (1919–1980) football player and coach
- Münir Nurettin Selçuk (1900–1981), musician, tenor singer
- Curt Kosswig (1903–1982), German zoology and genetics professor
- Tezer Özlü (1943–1986), writer
- Sadi Irmak (1904–1990), academician, prime minister (1974–1975)
- Tarık Zafer Tunaya (1916–1991), lawyer, academician
- Abidin Dino (1913–1993), painter (without headstone as wished by himself)
- Bedia Muvahhit (1896–1994), actress
- Cihat Arman (1919–1994), football player
- Mehmet Ali Aybar (1908–1995), politician
- Onat Kutlar (1936–1995), writer, poet, founder of Turkish Sinematek
- Hanzade Sultan (1923–1998), Ottoman princess

=== 21st century ===
- Mîna Urgan (1916–2000), academic, translator, writer and politician,
- Fatma Neslişah Sultan (1921–2012), daughter of Princess Sabiha,
- Avni Arbaş (1919–2003), painter,
- Attila İlhan (1925–2005), poet, journalist,
- Necla Sultan (1926–2006), Ottoman princess,
- Feyyaz Berker (1925–2017), businessman,
- Erdoğan Teziç (1936–2017), academic, jurist,
- Güngör Uras (1933–2018), economist, journalist and author,
- Yıldız Kenter (1928–2019), actress,
- Doğan Cüceloğlu (1938–2021), psychologist, nonfiction writer,
- Tarhan Erdem (1933–2022), politician,
- İlhan İrem (1955–2022), singer,
- Ziya Şengül (1944–2023), footballer,
- Ayla Algan (1937–2024), actress,
- Filiz Akın (1943-2025), film actress
