= Naciye Sultan =

Ottoman princess

- Born: 25 October 1896; Feriye Palace, Constantinople, Ottoman Empire
- Died: 4 December 1957 (aged 61); Nişantaşı, Istanbul, Turkey
- Burial: Şehzade Ahmed Kemaleddin Mausoleum, Yahya Efendi Cemetery, Istanbul
- Spouse: Ismail Enver Pasha (m. 1911; died 1922) Mehmed Kamil Pasha (m. 1923; div. 1949)
- Issue: first marriage; Mahpeyker Hanımsultan; Türkan Hanımsultan; Sultanzade Ali Bey; second marriage; Rana Hanımsultan
Names
- Turkish: Emine Naciye Sultan; Ottoman Turkish: امینه ناجیه سلطان
- Dynasty: Ottoman
- Father: Şehzade Selim Süleyman
- Mother: Ayşe Tarziter Hanım
- Religion: Sunni Islam

Emine Naciye Sultan (Ottoman Turkish: امینه ناجیه سلطان; 25 October 1896 – 4 December 1957) was an Ottoman princess, the daughter of Şehzade Selim Süleyman, son of Sultan Abdulmejid I.

== Early life and education ==
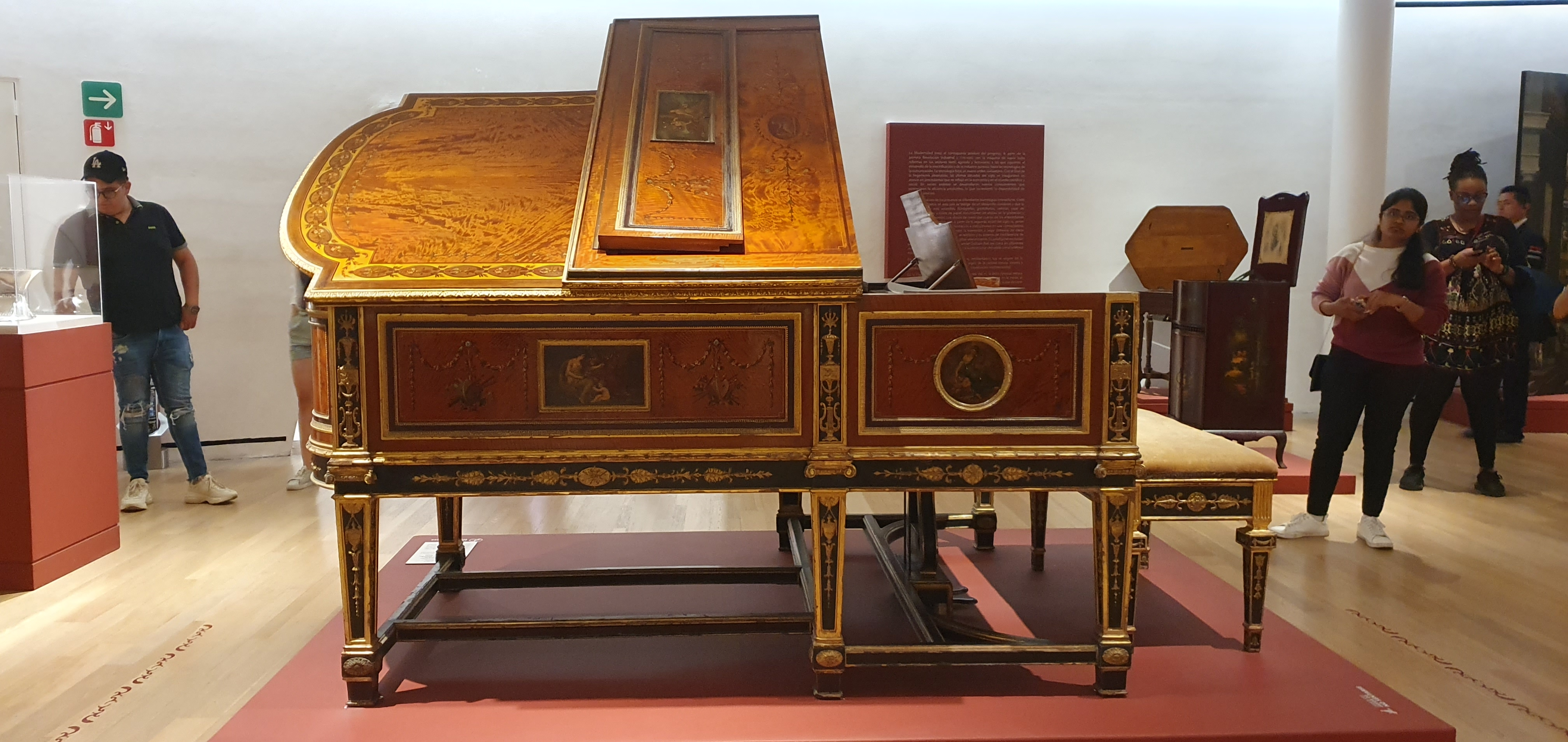
Piano of princess Naciye Sultana in Museo Soumaya, Mexico City.

Naciye Sultan was born on 25 October 1896 in the Feriye Palace. Her father was Şehzade Selim Süleyman, son of Sultan Abdulmejid I and Serfiraz Hanım, and her mother was Ayşe Tarziter Hanım, an Abkhazian lady from the Bargan-Ipa family. She was the second child, and only daughter born to her father and the eldest child of her mother. She had a full brother, Şehzade Mehmed Şerafeddin, seven years younger than her, and an elder half-brother, Şehzade Mehmed Abdülhalim.

Her family spent their winters in the Feriye Palace, and their summers in the Nisbetiyye Mansion located in Bebek.

Naciye was educated privately. Her first teacher was Aynîzâde Tahsin Efendi, who taught her alphabets. Her second teacher was Hafez Ihsan Efendi with whom she took her Turkish lessons for many years before he was replaced with Halid Ziya Bey (Uşaklıgil). She also took French and Turkish lessons from a German lady named Fraulein Funke, who later converted to Islam and was named Adile.

When Naciye got older, she also started taking music lessons. She took her piano and violin lessons from the saz teacher Udî Andon. She also took piano lessons from a German teacher named Braun, while her piano instructors were Lange and Hege. Naciye Sultan especially liked piano lessons and her piano teacher Hege, who was a piano teacher at Mekteb-i Harbiyye for a while and was one of the most famous pianists of Istanbul at the time.

Naciye was much loved by her father's first consort, Filişan Hanım, who treated her and her children like a second mother. She also helped her practice the piano.

== Engagement to Abdurrahim ==
When Şehzade Abdurrahim Hayri, son of Sultan Abdul Hamid II came of age of marriage, his father decided that he would marry Naciye Sultan. However, Naciye and her family were not immediately informed of this decision. When they learned of the decision, both her father and mother turned against this because Naciye was only twelve years old at the time. However, her father couldn't oppose his brother, and was obliged to accept it. And so Naciye was engaged to Abdürrahim.

== First marriage ==
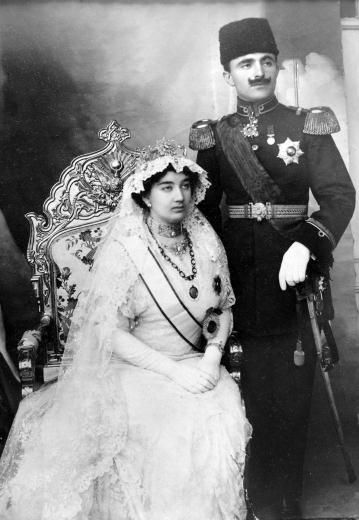
Naciye Sultan and Enver Pasha at their marriage

Ismail Enver Pasha became the subject of gossip about an alleged romance between him and Princess Iffet of Egypt. When this story reached Istanbul, the grand vizier, Hüseyin Hilmi Pasha decided to exploit Enver's marital eligibility by arranging a rapprochement between the Committee of Union and Progress and the imperial family. After a careful search, the grand vizier chose Naciye Sultan as Enver's future bride. Both the grand vizier and Enver's mother then notified him of this decision. Enver had never seen Naciye, and he did not trust his mother's letters, since he suspected her of being enamored with the idea of having a princess as her daughter-in-law.

Therefore, he asked a reliable friend, Ahmed Rıza Bey, who was a member of the Turkish Parliament to investigate. When the latter reported favorably on the prospective bride's education and beauty, as well as on the prospective dowry, Enver took a practical view of this marriage and accepted the arrangement. Naciye had been previously engaged to Şehzade Abdurrahim Hayri. However, Sultan Mehmed V broke off the engagement, and in April 1909, when Naciye was just twelve years old, engaged her to Enver, fifteen years older than her. Following the old Ottoman pattern of life and tradition, the engagement ceremony was celebrated in Enver's absence as he remained in Berlin.

The marriage took place on 15 May 1911 in the Dolmabahçe Palace, and was performed by Şeyhülislam Musa Kazım Efendi. Head clerk of the sultan Halid Ziya Bey served as Naciye's deputy, and her witnesses were director of the imperial kitchen Galib Bey, and the personal physician of the sultan Hacı Ahmed Bey. Minister of war Mahmud Şevket Pasha served as Enver's deputy, and his witnesses were aide-de-camp of the sultan Binbaşı Re'fet Bey and chamberlain of the imperial gates Ahsan Bey. The wedding took place about three years later on 5 March 1914 in the Nişantaşı Palace. He became a Damat. The couple were given one of the palaces of Kuruçeşme. The marriage was very happy.

On 17 May 1917, Naciye gave birth to the couple's eldest child, a daughter, Mahpeyker Hanımsultan. She was followed by a second daughter, Türkan Hanımsultan, born on 4 July 1919. Both of them were born in Istanbul. During Enver's stay in Berlin, Naciye and her daughters Mahpeyker and Türkan joined him. When Enver left for Russian SSR his family remained there. His son, Sultanzade Ali Bey was born in Berlin on 29 September 1921, after Enver's departure and he never saw him. Naciye was widowed at Enver's death on 4 August 1922.

== Philanthropy ==
In 1912, the "Hilal-i Ahmer Centre for Women" was organized within the "Ottoman Hilal-i Ahmer Association", a foundation established in 1877 to provide medical care in Istanbul and surrounding communities. In February, 1914 the organization announced the start of a course for nursing aids, which would consist of eighteen lessons of two hours each on Fridays and Sundays. The classes were to be taught by Besim Ömer and Akıl Muhtar. Between 40 and 50 women participated in the course and at the end of the five months course 27 women successfully took the exam. These 27 women, who were all wives and daughters of prominent Ottoman officials, received their certificate during a ceremony in the presence of Naciye and her mother, and Sultan Mehmed V's first wife Kamures Kadın.

In August 1916, "The Society for Muslim Working Women" was set up in the capital. It had three branches, in Istanbul, Pera, and Üsküdar. Its president was Naciye Sultan, while Enver himself served as its patron. Naciye's leading role in this society was a clear sign of the committee's involvement in integrating women into a life beyond the household. The society regulated the working conditions of women and encouraged them to get married and form a family.

== Second marriage ==
After Enver Pasha's death, Naciye Sultan married his younger brother, Mehmed Kâmil Pasha on 30 October 1923 in Berlin. He became a Damat. At the exile of the imperial family in March 1924, Naciye and her husband settled in Paris, France. Here Naciye gave birth to the couple's only child, a daughter, Rana Hanımsultan on 25 February 1926. In 1933, she met with her brother Şehzade Mehmed Şerafeddin in Nice, nine years after the exile of the imperial family. In the beginning of World War II Naciye and her husband settled in Bern, Switzerland. Naciye Sultan could not endure her longing for her children. Her daughters Mahpeyker, Türkan and Rana were brought to Switzerland by their uncle Nuri Pasha. Ali was in Istanbul, due to studies, and was not able to come. In 1943, Mahpeyker and Türkan returned to Istanbul. In 1946, after the end of the World War, Naciye, her husband and their daughter Rana returned to Paris, France.

Naciye ensured that her children received a good education. Her eldest daughter Mahpeyker became a doctor, and her younger daughter Türkan graduated in chemistry. In 1946, Türkan married Hüveyda Mayatepek, a foreign minister, and son of Hasan Tahsin Mayatepek. Naciye was unable to attend the wedding of her daughter. Mahpeyker married her colleague Doctor Fikret Ürgüplü, and again Naciye was unable to attend her wedding either. Naciye's son Ali married Perizad Hanım, daughter of Abdidin Daver. She then went to London with her son where he served as air fire assistant. She spent two months there and then went to Switzerland to her daughter Türkan.

Naciye divorced Kamil Pasha in 1949. He then returned to Turkey on 22 September 1949, and was granted Turkish citizenship by the decree of the Council of Ministers. The passport and citizenship law created a legal loophole and Kamil Pasha most likely used it. For his brother Nuri Killigil who was overseeing the works of Naciye Sultan and her family was killed by an explosion in his gun factory in Istanbul on 2 March 1949. Kamil Pasha had to return to Turkey to manage the works of his wife and her family. To do that, he had to cut his ties with the dynasty in accordance with the law, that is, he had to divorce his wife. Kamil did divorce Naciye Sultan and returned to Turkey, but the divorce was on paper. It was evident from the fact that Naciye never mentioned her divorce in her memoirs and interviews. And second, Sabiha Sultan, her cousin, who returned to Turkey after the enactment of the passport law, wrote in her diary that Naciye and Kamil Pasha paid her a visit in Istanbul on 1 September 1952. Kamil Pasha died in 1962.

== Death ==
Naciye Sultan died of liver cancer in Nişantaşı on 4 December 1957 at the age of sixty-one, and was buried beside her father due to her last will in the mausoleum of Şehzade Ahmed Kemaleddin, Yahya Efendi cemetery.

== Honours ==
- Order of the House of Osman
- Order of Charity, 1st Class

== Issue ==
Name	Birth	Death	Notes
Ismail Enver Pasha (married 15 May 1911; 22 November 1881 – 4 August 1922)
Mahpeyker Hanımsultan	17 May 1917	3 April 2000	Born in Kuruçeşme Palace; Married and had issue; Died in Istanbul, Turkey, and buried there;
Türkan Hanımsultan	4 July 1919	25 December 1989	Born in Kuruçeşme Palace; Married and had issue; Died in Ankara, Turkey, and buried there;
Sultanzade Ali Bey	29 September 1921	2 December 1971	Born in Berlin, Germany; Married with issue; Died in Australia;
Mehmed Kâmil Pasha (married 30 October 1923 – divorced 1949; died 1962)
Rana Hanımsultan	25 February 1926	14 April 2008	Born in Paris, France; died in Istanbul, Turkey. On 25 July 1949 she married Sadi Eldem, they had two daughters, Ceyda Eldem (1 March 1952–August 2014) and Necla Eldem (24 March 1954 – 1964) and a son, Edhem Eldem (born 2 March 1960). He married Zeynep Sedef Torunoglu on 2 September 1983 and they had a daughter, Simin Eldem (born 2 January 1987);

== Sources ==
- Rorlich, Azade-Ayse (1972). Enver Pasha and the Bolshevik Revolution. University of Wisconsin—Madison.
- Milanlıoğlu, Neval (2011). Emine Naciye Sultan'ın Hayatı (1896-1957) (Postgraguate Thesis) (in Turkish). Marmara University Institute of Social Sciences.
