= Khanum =

Turco-Mongolian honorific title

Khanum (Note: Also spelled Khanam, Qanysham, Kanysham, Khanym, Hanum, Hanım, Hanem, Khanom, or Khanoum (Uzbek: Xonim/Хоним, Kyrgyz: Канышам/Qanysham and Каныш/Qanysh or Каныша/Qanysha, Kazakh: Ханым/Hanym, Mongolian: Ханым; Azerbaijani: Xanım; Turkish: Hanım; Egyptian Arabic: هانم; Levantine Arabic, Persian, Urdu: Persian: خانم; Hindi: ख़ानुम; Bengali: খাঁনম or খানম)) is a female royal and aristocratic title that was originally derived through a Central Asian title, and later used in the Middle East and South Asia. It is the feminine equivalent of the title Khan for a sovereign or military ruler, widely used by medieval nomadic Turkic peoples living in Asia and Europe and also Mongol tribes living north and northwest of modern-day China. In the construction of words in the Turkic languages, the suffix "-um or -ım" adds "my". This means the word "Khanum" can be transliterated as "my Khan". This arises from the tale, depicting a Khan announcing to his subjects I am your Khan, and She is my Khan (Khanum). The Rourans were the first people who used the titles Khagan and Khan for their emperors, replacing the Chanyu of the Xiongnu, whom René Grousset and others assume to be Turkic.

In Modern Turkish, it is spelled Hanım and is used similarly to the titles of "lady" or "mrs." or "miss" in the English language. The title of Hanımefendi is a combination of the words Khanum, Hanım in Turkish, and efendi, and is a more formal title to address women in the modern age.

Today, the term is used as a way to respectfully address women of any social rank. "Khanum" can be understood as equivalent of "madam", or more colloquially, "ma'am" in some Ottoman and Turkic influenced countries.

In South Asia, particularly in Afghanistan, Khyber Pakhtunkhwa, Sindh, Baluchistan and North India, Khanum has been adapted for use as an honorific for Muslim women of high social status.

== See also ==
- Begum
- Hanım
- Khatun
