= Sabiha Sultan =

Ottoman princess, daughter of Mehmed VI and Nazikeda Kadın

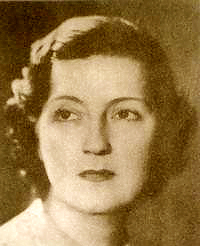
- 1939 photograph
- Born: 19 March 1894; Ortaköy Palace, Ortaköy, Constantinople, Ottoman Empire
- Died: 26 August 1971 (aged 77); Çengelköy, Istanbul, Turkey
- Burial: Aşiyan Asri Cemetery, Istanbul, Turkey
- Spouse: Şehzade Ömer Faruk (m. 1920; div. 1948)
- Issue: Fatma Neslişah Sultan; Zehra Hanzade Sultan; Hibetullah Necla Sultan
Names
- Turkish: Rukiye Sabiha Sultan; Ottoman Turkish: رقیه صبیحه سلطان
- Dynasty: Ottoman
- Father: Mehmed VI
- Mother: Nazikeda Kadın
- Religion: Sunni Islam

Rukiye Sabiha Sultan (Ottoman Turkish: رقیہ صبیحه سلطان; after 1952 legally Sabiha Osmanoğlu; 19 March 1894 – 26 August 1971) was an Ottoman princess, the third and last daughter of Sultan Mehmed VI and his main wife Nazikeda Kadın. She was the first wife of Şehzade Ömer Faruk, son of Caliph Abdulmejid II and Şehsuvar Hanım.

== Early life ==
Sabiha Sultan was born on 19 March 1894 in her father's Ortaköy Palace in Ortaköy, Istanbul. Her father was Mehmed VI, son of Abdulmejid I and Gülistu Kadın. Her mother was Nazikeda Kadın, daughter of Prince Hasan Ali Marshania and Princess Fatma Horecan Aredba and first wife of her father. She was the third and last daughter born to her father and mother. She had two sisters, Münire Fenire Sultan, six years older than her, born and died in 1888, and Fatma Ulviye Sultan, two year older than her. Her birth was difficult, so that later her mother could not have any more children. She had a younger half-brother, Şehzade Mehmed Ertuğrul, born in 1912 by the Second Consort Müveddet Kadın.

Refik Bey, the son of Mihrifelek Hanım, the second Kalfa of Sultan Abdulmejid I, was appointed teacher to Sabiha, and her elder sister Ulviye Sultan. The two learned to play piano from Mlle Voçino.

== Marriage ==
=== Suitors ===
When her father ascended the throne in 1918, Sabiha was still unmarried, but had several admirers. Those who knew her always said that she was not like the other women of the Ottoman family. "Sabiha Sultan was different", said the Turkish poet Yahya Kemal.

Her first suitor is thought to be Rauf Orbay, a relative of one of Sultan Abdul Hamid II's consorts, Sazkar Hanım. He was followed by Mahmud Kemal Pasha. Another was Fuad Bey of the Babanzade clan. Captain Safvet Arıkan and Lieutenant Suphi Bey from Damascus were other suitors, but none of them were accepted. Another suitor was Mehmed Ali Pasha, the nephew of Ahmed Muhtar Pasha.

Her betrothal to Ahmad Shah Qajar, the last ruling member of the Qajar dynasty, and Mustafa Kemal Atatürk was forfeited in favor of her second cousin Şehzade Ömer Faruk, thus missing her chance of becoming the first "First Lady" of the nascent Turkish Republic.

=== Wedding ===
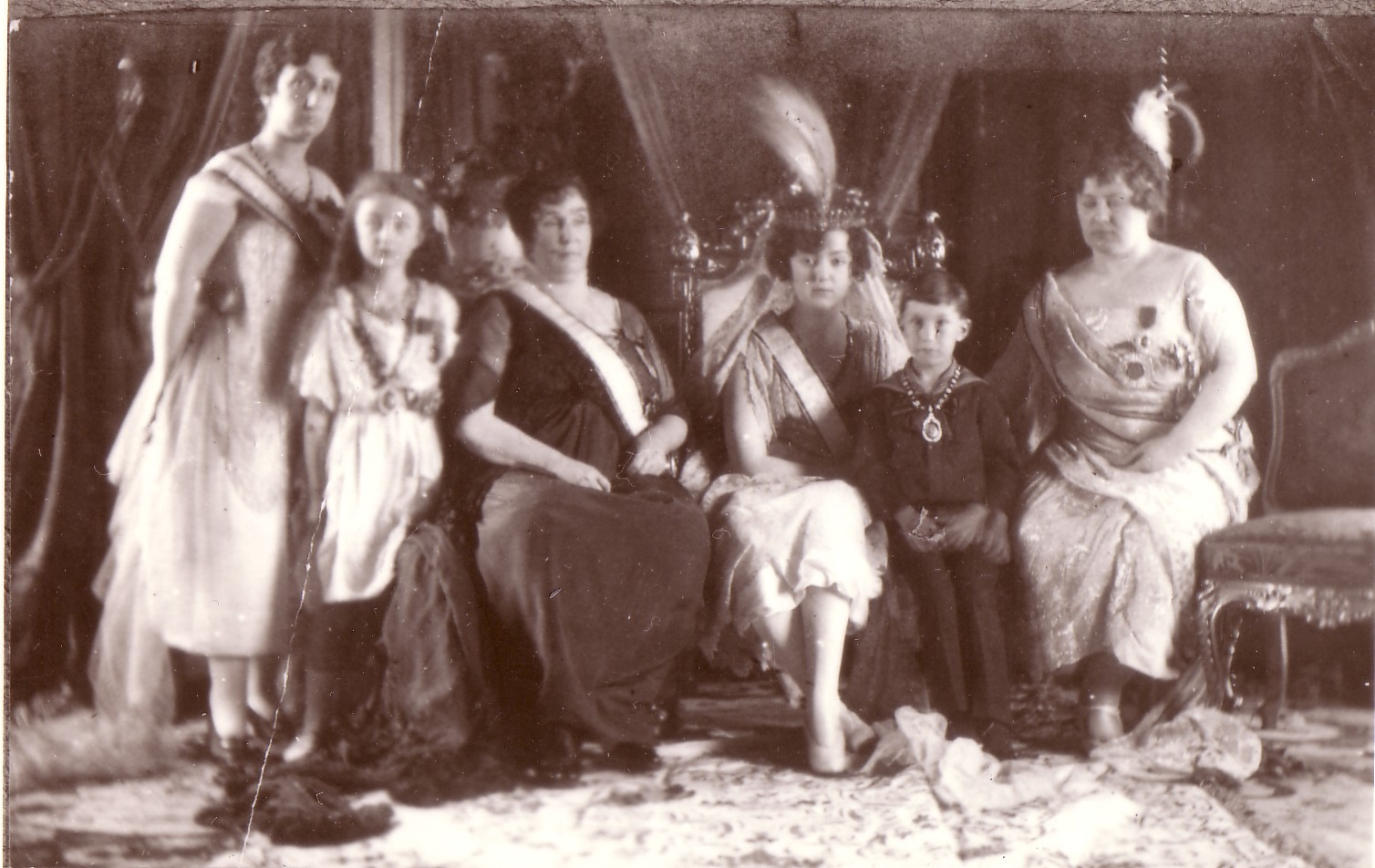
Sabiha (third from right) on her wedding day

Sabiha and Şehzade Ömer Faruk, who was four years her junior, the son of Abdulmejid II, the last Caliph of the Ottoman Caliphate and Şehsuvar Kadın, were in love with each other. Initially the marriage was rejected because between the descendants of Abdülmecid I (as Mehmed VI) and those of Abdulaziz (as Şehzade Ömer Faruk) there was no friendship due to Abdulaziz's violent death. Şehsuvar Hanım, the prince's mother, called on Nazikeda, and succeeded in convincing her.

The marriage took place on 29 April 1920, in the pavilion of the sacred relics at the Topkapı Palace. The marriage was performed by Şeyhülislam Hayrizade Ibrahim Efendi. Sabiha Sultan's deputy was Başkatip Ali Fuad Bey, and Ömer Faruk's deputy was Ömer Yaver Pasha. The wedding reception took place at the Yıldız Palace.

In May 1920, ten days after their wedding, Sabiha and Faruk moved to the mansion of Rumelihisarı. In October of the same year, her father bought two houses for his daughters in Nişantaşı. He gave one house to Ulviye Sultan, and the other to Sabiha. The mansions were known as the Twin Palaces. Sabiha and Faruk decided to live in Nişantaşı during the winter and in Rumelihisarı during the summer.

=== Issue and exile ===
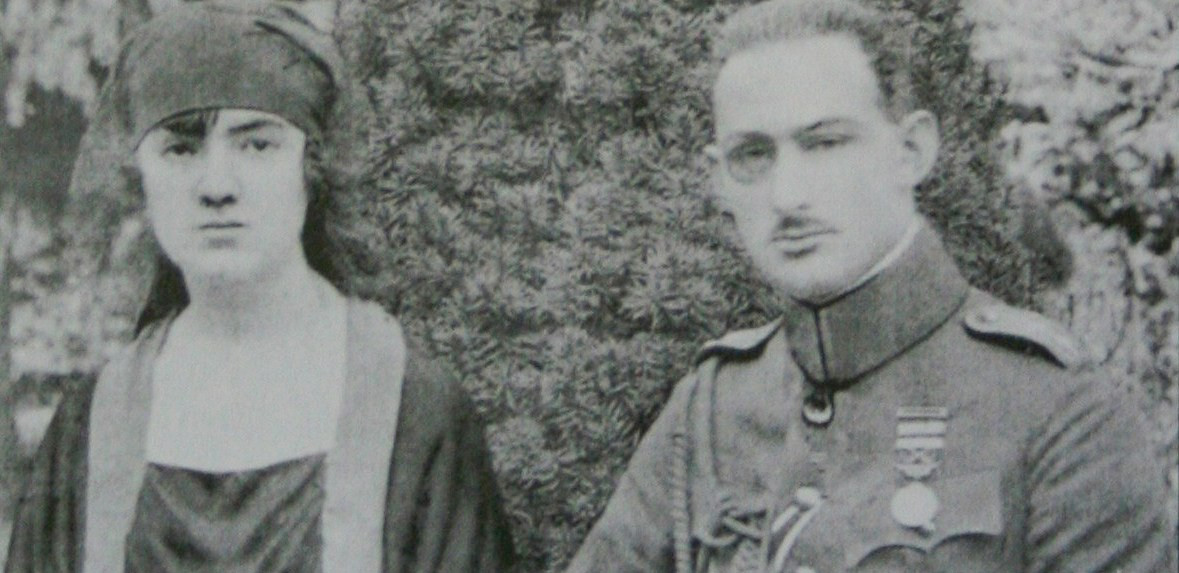
Sabiha and her husband, Ömer Faruk

The couple's eldest daughter, Fatma Neslişah Sultan was born on 2 February 1921 in the Nişantaşı Palace. She was followed two years later by Zehra Hanzade Sultan, born on 12 September 1923 in the Dolmabahçe Palace.

Upon the exile of the imperial family in March 1924, Sabiha and her two daughters left Turkey. On 11 March, she left her mansion in Rumelihisarı and took the Orient Express to join her husband and father-in-law in Switzerland. Later they moved to Nice, France, where her youngest daughter Hibetullah Necla Sultan was born on 16 May 1926, the same day of Mehmed VI's death.

In 1930, Şehzade Ibrahim Tevfik, now penniless, and his family, came to live in Nice in a small cottage in a village nearby with his family. He then moved with his youngest daughter Fevziye Sultan in with his cousin Sabiha and Ömer Faruk, where he died in 1931. Fevziye came back to live with her mother.

Her mother also used to come for a stay at Nice with her. A large room used to be assigned to her, which she shared with Şehzade Mehmed Ertuğrul, her stepson, whenever he came back from Grasse. In 1938, she moved to Alexandria, Egypt, with her mother and sister after her mother's grave illness there.

On 26 September 1940, she attended the wedding of her daughter, Neslişah Sultan and Prince Mohamed Abdel Moneim, son of Egypt's last khedive Abbas II Hilmi. Her two other daughters, Hanzade Sultan, and Necla Sultan also married Egyptian princes, Mehmed Ali Ibrahim on 19 September 1940, and Amr Ibrahim in 1943, respectively. After the weddings, Sabiha and Faruk moved to Egypt with their daughters.

=== Divorce ===
Sabiha's husband, Ömer Faruk, developed an increased interest in his cousin Mihrişah Sultan, the daughter of crown prince Şehzade Yusuf Izzeddin. It was also public knowledge that things were not going well between Faruk and Sabiha.

In 1944, Mihrişah even sided with Faruk when the council chose Prince Ahmed Nihad as the head of the family. While Sabiha backed the council's decision and approved the choice of the leader. Her daughters also sided with her. Faruk accused Sabiha of turning their daughters against him. But he was already in love with Mihrişah and the issue of the council was just an excuse.

And so, on 5 March 1948, after twenty eight years of marriage, Ömer Faruk divorced Sabiha, and married Mihrişah Sultan. However, their marriage didn't last, and a few years later Mihrişah divorced. Later Faruk would tell his friends, "I divorced the most beautiful woman in the world to marry the ugliest one. Fate!".

== Later years ==
Following her divorce, Sabiha Sultan left her home in Maadi on the other side of Cairo to be closer to her eldest daughter, Princess Neslişah. Taking a few things with her she moved to a small apartment in Heliopolis. She sent her furniture to her second daughter Princess Hanzade's house in Cairo, while she was living in Paris, France. But after the Egyptian revolution of 1952, all she owned there was confiscated with all the belongings of her daughter and son-in-law.

Later, Sabiha went to Paris for a while, to live with Princess Hanzade. Sabiha also stayed with Neslişah at Montreux for sometime. Here she visited her cousin Sultanzade Sabahaddin Bey, son of Seniha Sultan. But, as soon as the female members of the Ottoman family were allowed to return to Turkey in 1952, she moved to Istanbul, when she took the name Sabiha Osmanoğlu. She rented a small flat in Kuyuku Bostan Street in the district of Nişantaşı, and the few things she still had in Egypt were sent to Istanbul.

== Death ==
Sabiha Sultan died on 26 August 1971 at the age of seventy seven in her mansion in Çengelköy, Istanbul, and was buried in Aşiyan Asri Cemetery.

== Honours ==
Styles of Sabiha Sultan
- Reference style: Her Imperial Highness
- Spoken style: Your Imperial Highness

- Order of the House of Osman
- Order of Medjidie, Jeweled
- Order of Charity, 1st Class

== Issue ==
Name	Birth	Death	Notes
Fatma Neslişah Sultan	2 February 1921	2 April 2012	Married once, and had issue, a son, and a daughter; died in Istanbul
Zehra Hanzade Sultan	12 September 1923	19 March 1998	Married once, and had issue, a son and a daughter; died in Paris
Hibetullah Necla Sultan	16 May 1926	6 October 2006	Born in Nice; married once, and had issue, a son; died in Madrid

== Sources ==
- Açba, Leyla (2004). Bir Çerkes prensesinin harem hatıraları. L & M. ISBN 978-9-756-49131-7.
- Bardakçı, Murat (2017). Neslishah: The Last Ottoman Princess. Oxford University Press. ISBN 978-9-774-16837-6.
- Sakaoğlu, Necdet (2008). Bu mülkün kadın sultanları: Vâlide sultanlar, hâtunlar, hasekiler, kadınefendiler, sultanefendiler. Oğlak Yayıncılık. ISBN 978-9-753-29623-6.
- Uluçay, M. Çağatay (2011). Padişahların kadınları ve kızları. Ötüken. ISBN 978-9-754-37840-5.
