= Hasan Tahsin Mayatepek =

Turkish diplomat (1882–1973)

Hasan Tahsin Mayatepek was a Turkish diplomat. He got his surname from his position as Turkish ambassador in Mexico (31 March 1935 – 7 March 1938) where he concluded that the Mayan word for 'hill' (tepek) was the same word as in Turkish (tepe). His son Huveyda Mayatepek married to Enver Pasha's daughter Turkan Mayatepek. Diplomat and businessman Osman Mayatepek is his grandson.

== Career ==
Mayatepek wrote for years about the civilization of the Maya, after which he was sent to Mexico in 1935 for three years by Atatürk as the new ambassador of Turkey to Mexico. At the request of Atatürk he continued his research and focused on the similarities of the Turkish language and the language of the Maya. When Mayatepek noticed that the Mayan word for 'hill' ('tepek') showed great similarities with the Turkish equivalent ('tepe'), he wrote a report for the Turkish president Atatürk. This report became great news in Turkey and people began to believe in a common ancestor of both the Mexican Maya, and the Central Asian Turks. As a reward, Hasan Tahsin was granted the surname 'Mayatepek' (or 'Maya hill') from Atatürk himself. Afterwards Atatürk asked Mayatepek to also focus on other North American native languages like that of Inca, Aztecs and to see if a common languages was plausible between these languages and Turkish. After the fourteenth report of Mayatepek, Atatürk suspected Mayatepek of sending more of the same arguments to support this theory in order to prolong his stay in Mexico. Mayatepek was soon recalled from Mexico and no new ambassador was appointed until September 29, 1947.
