= Neslişah Sultan (daughter of Şehzade Ömer Faruk) =

Imperial Princess of the Ottoman Empire (1921-2012)

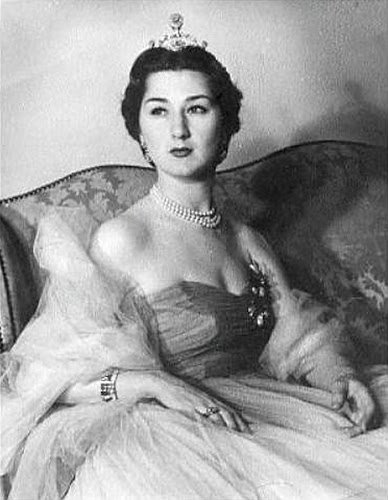
- Born: 4 February 1921; Nişantaşı Palace, Nişantaşı, Constantinople, Ottoman Empire
- Died: 2 April 2012 (aged 91); Ortaköy, Istanbul, Turkey
- Burial: Aşiyan Asri Cemetery, Turkey
- Spouse: Prince Muhammad Abdel Moneim Pasha (m. 1940; died 1979)
- Issue: Prince Abbas Hilmi; Princess Ikbal Moneim
Names
- Turkish: Fatma Neslişah Sultan; Ottoman Turkish: فاطمه نسل شاہ سلطان
- House: Ottoman (by birth); Alawiyya (by marriage)
- Father: Şehzade Ömer Faruk
- Mother: Sabiha Sultan
- Religion: Sunni Islam

Fatma Neslişah Sultan, also Büyük Neslişah, after 1957 Neslişah Osmanoğlu (Ottoman Turkish: نسل شاہ سلطان, lit. 'lineage of the shah'; 4 February 1921 – 2 April 2012) was an Ottoman princess, the paternal granddaughter of the last Ottoman Caliph Abdulmejid II and his first wife, Şehsuvar Hanım; and maternal granddaughter of the last Ottoman Sultan Mehmed VI and his first wife, Nazikeda Kadın. She was the daughter of Şehzade Ömer Faruk and his first wife and cousin Sabiha Sultan.

== Early life ==
Neslişah Sultan was born on 2 February 1921 in her family's residence, the Sabiha Sultan Mansion, in the Nişantaşı neighbourhood of Istanbul. Her father was Şehzade Ömer Faruk, the only son of Caliph Abdulmejid II and Şehsuvar Hanım. Her mother was Sabiha Sultan, the youngest daughter of Sultan Mehmed VI and Nazikeda Kadın. She had two younger sisters, Hanzade Sultan, and Necla Sultan. Her birth was the final entry inscribed in the palace register of dynasty members, making her the last imperial member of the Ottoman family. Shortly after her birth, she was nicknamed Büyük Neslişah, or Neslişah "the elder", to distinguish her from the slightly younger cousin Safvet Neslişah Sultan, called Küçük Neslişah (Neslişah "the younger").

Upon the exile of the imperial family in March 1924, Neslişah and her family settled in Nice, France, where she spent her childhood and adolescence, and received her education. Her grandfather, Abdulmejid, used to take her and her sister Neslişah to the seashore on special occasions. The family relocated to Egypt in 1938 over fears of the outbreak of the Second World War, where she received a proposal from Egyptian prince Hassan Toussoun, and despite her protests, she was engaged to him. However, later she broke off the engagement.

== Marriage ==
In 1940, Prince Muhammad Abdel Moneim, son of Egypt's last Khedive Abbas Hilmi II, proposed to Neslişah. Neslişah rejected the proposal, but accepted it following pressure from her father, despite her younger sister Hanzade, who later married another Egyptian prince a week before her sister, having volunteered to marry Moneim in her stead, an offer her father refused. The marriage took place on 26 September 1940 in el-Orouba Palace, Cairo, and she was given the title Sahibat-al Sumuw Al-Amira Neslishah (Her Highness Princess Neslishah). Two years earlier, Abdel Moneim, heir to a US$50,000,000 fortune, had obtained permission from his second cousin King Farouk of Egypt to marry Princess Myzejen Zogu (1909–1969), sister of King Zog I of Albania. However, the marriage never took place and Prince Abdel Moneim married Neslişah instead. On 16 October 1941, she gave birth to Prince Abbas Hilmi. He was followed three years later by Princess Ikbal, born on 22 December 1944.

When the Egyptian Free Officers Movement deposed King Farouk in the July 1952 Revolution, they chose Prince Abdel Moneim to serve as chairman of the three-member Regency Body established to assume the powers of Farouk's newly enthroned infant son Fuad II. The Regency Body was dissolved on 7 September 1952, and Abdel Moneim was appointed as sole Prince regent. In the absence of a Queen consort, Neslişah de facto served as such by virtue of her position as the wife of the Prince regent. Her few official appearances during her husband's regency focused on charity work. Like the royal consorts who preceded her, she attended sporting events such as polo matches and the international tennis tournament final.

Around 1943, Neslişah's father, Ömer Faruk, developed an increased interest in his cousin Mihrişah Sultan, the daughter of Şehzade Yusuf Izzeddin. The turbulence of the relationship between Faruk and his wife Sabiha was also a public knowledge. She and her sisters sided with their mother. Faruk accused Sabiha of turning their daughters against him. Murat Bardakçı opines that he had already fallen in love with Mihrişah and the issue of the council was merely an excuse. In 1948, after twenty-eight years of marriage, Faruk divorced Sabiha, and married Mihrişah, after which Sabiha moved to live near her. Neslişah never came to accept her father's second wife.

Prince Abdel Moneim's regency lasted ten months. The Egyptian Revolutionary Command Council formally abolished the monarchy on 18 June 1953. In 1957, Abdel Moneim and Neslişah were arrested. Again forced into exile, Neslişah was released from prison after the President of the Republic of Turkey intervened and demanded her release. She subsequently lived for a short time in Europe, then returned to her native Turkey. In 1963, she reclaimed Turkish citizenship, and took the surname Osmanoğlu, which had been assigned to members of the Ottoman former imperial family. Prince Abdel Moneim died in 1979 in Istanbul, where Princess Neslişah continued to live with her unmarried daughter Ikbal.

== Death ==
Neslişah died of heart attack on 2 April 2012 at her home in Ortaköy, attended by her daughter. At the time of her death, Neslişah was the most senior Ottoman princess. After the deaths of Şehzade Burhaneddin Cem, son of Şehzade Ibrahim Tevfik, in 2008 and Prince Ertuğrul Osman in 2009, she was also the last surviving member of the Ottoman dynasty to have been born during the Ottoman era. A funeral service was held for her in Yıldız Hamidiye Mosque. She was buried in Aşiyan Asri Cemetery, next to her mother and sisters. President Abdullah Gül presented a message of condolence to family members. Prime Minister Recep Tayyip Erdoğan praised the late princess. "She was the poster-child for nobleness who carried the blood of Osman," he said in Parliament, referring to Osman I, the Anatolian ruler who established the Ottoman Empire. "We remember her with high regard and our blessings."

== Issue ==
By her marriage, Neslişah Sultan had a son and a daughter:

- Prince Sultanzade Abbas Hilmi (b. 16 October 1941). Named after his paternal grandfather, he married once and had a daughter and a son.
- Princess Ikbal Hanımsultan (b. 22 December 1944). Named after her paternal grandmother, she married Mursel Saviç in January 2000.

== Personality ==
Neslişah was fluent in French, English, German and Arabic and was also an avid skier, swimmer and equestrian. She was also interested in history, literature, geography, botany and the culture of cuisine. She was also highly respected by a number of significant conductors in the music world.

== Honours ==
- Order of the House of Osman, 1922

== Ancestry ==
Ancestors of Neslişah Sultan (daughter of Şehzade Ömer Faruk)

8. Abdulaziz
4. Abdulmejid II
9. Hayranidil Kadın
2. Şehzade Ömer Faruk
5. Şehsuvar Hanım
1. Neslişah Sultan
12. Abdulmejid I
6. Mehmed VI
13. Gülüstü Hanım
3. Sabiha Sultan
14. Hasan Marshan
7. Nazikeda Kadın
15. Fatma Horecan Aredba

== See also ==
- Sultans:Imperial Princesses

== Sources ==
- Bardakçı, Murat (2017). Neslishah: The Last Ottoman Princess. Oxford University Press. ISBN 978-9-774-16837-6.
