= Hümeyra Hanımsultan =

Ottoman princess, daughter of Ulviye Sultan

- Born: 4 June 1917; Nişantaşı, Constantinople, Ottoman Empire (now Istanbul, Turkey)
- Died: 17 May 2000 (aged 82); Kuşadası, Aydın, Turkey
- Spouse: Fahir Bey (m. 1939; div. 1942) Halil Özbaş (m. 1944; died 1963)
- Issue: Second marriage; Ismail Halil Özbaş; Hanzade Özbaş
Names
- Turkish: Suade Hümeyra Hanımsultan; Ottoman Turkish: سعاده حمیرہ خانم سلطان
- Father: Damat Ismail Hakkı Pasha
- Mother: Fatma Ulviye Sultan
- Religion: Sunni Islam

Suade Hümeyra Hanımsultan (Ottoman Turkish: سعاده حمیرہ خانم سلطان; also Hümeyra Özbaş; 4 June 1917 – 17 May 2000) was an Ottoman princess, the daughter of Fatma Ulviye Sultan, daughter of Mehmed VI and Nazikeda Kadın, and her first husband Damat Ismail Hakkı Pasha.

== Biography ==
Suade Hümeyra Hanımsultan was born on 4 June 1917 at her mother's mansion in Nişantaşı. She was the only child of Ulviye Sultan, daughter of Sultan Mehmed VI and Nazikeda Kadın, and Damat Ismail Hakkı Pasha, son of the last grand vizier of the Ottoman Empire Ahmet Tevfik Pasha and Elisabeth Tschumi. Her parents divorced in 1922, and her mother remarried in 1923.

After the exile of the imperial family in March 1924, Hümeyra and her family settled in Sanremo, Italy, next to her grandfather, Sultan Mehmed. After his death in May 1926, they moved to Monte Carlo, and later to Alexandria, Egypt in 1929.

In 1936, Mustafa Kemal Atatürk allowed her to enter Turkey. In 1939, a special law was passed for the return to Turkey of the three children of Enver Pasha, and the daughter of his wife Naciye Sultan from her second marriage. As Hümeyra's father had taken part in the War of Independence, she was also allowed to return to her country under the same law. The same year, she married Fahir Bey and went to America. They divorced in 1942, without issue.

She then taught Turkish at the Princeton University, where she met her future husband, Halil Özbaş. He came from a well-known family from Söke. They married in 1944, and had two children, Ismail Halim, born on 6 October 1945, and Hanzade, born on 4 October 1953. She was widowed at Halil's death in 1963 and settled in İzmir, where she lived with her mother. She was one of the founders of the Kismet Hotel in Kuşadası, İzmir. She died in Kuşadası at the age of eighty-two on 17 May 2000.

== Honours ==
- Order of the House of Osman, 1922

== Issue ==
| Name | Birth | Notes |
By Halil Özbaş (married 1944; 1918 – 18 November 1963)
| Ismail Halim Özbaş | 6 October 1945 | Born in Istanbul; married Evin and had a daughter and a son, Nadia and Halil |
| Hanzade Özbaş | 4 October 1953 | Born in İzmir; married Tevfik Moran and had two daughters, Neslişah and Mesude |

== Ancestry ==
Ancestors of Hümeyra Hanımsultan

8. Ferik Ismail Hakkı Pasha
4. Ahmet Tevfik Pasha Okday
9. Gülşinas Banu Hanım
2. İsmail Hakkı Okday
10. Jacob Tschumi
5. Elisabeth Tschumi
1. Hümeyra Hanımsultan
12. Abdulmejid I
6. Mehmed VI
13. Gülistu Kadın
3. Fatma Ulviye Sultan
14. Prince Hassan Ali Marshania
7. Nazikeda Kadın
15. Princess Fatma Horecan Aredba

== Sources ==
- Bardakçı, Murat (2017). Neslishah: The Last Ottoman Princess. Oxford University Press. ISBN 978-9-774-16837-6.
