= Rumeysa Aredba =

Abkhazian princess and lady-in-waiting (c. 1873-c. 1927)

- Born: Hatice Aredba c. 1873; Adler, Abkhazia
- Died: c. 1927 (aged 53–54); Istanbul, Turkey
- Burial: Istanbul
Names
- Hatice Rumeysa Hayrıdil Aredba
- House: Aredba
- Father: Halil Bey Aredba
- Religion: Islam

Rumeysa Hayrıdil Aredba (born Princess Hatice Aredba; c. 1873 - c. 1927) was an Abkhazian princess. She was a lady-in-waiting to Nazikeda Kadın, wife of Mehmed VI, the last Sultan of the Ottoman Empire. She is known for writing memoirs, which give details of the exile, and personality of Sultan Mehmed at San Remo.

== Life ==
Rumeysa Hanim was born as Hatice in 1873 in Abkhazia. She was a member of the Abkazian princely family, Aredba. Her father was Prince Halil Bey Aredba. She had an elder sister Amine Seten who was renamed Nazikeda, and married to Şehzade Yusuf Izzeddin, and a younger sister, Pakize Hanım, married to Esad Bey, a Hungarian.

In 1876, she had been brought to Istanbul as a young child, where she was entrusted to the imperial harem. She was then sent to Cemile Sultan's palace in Kandilli, where her name according to the custom of the Ottoman court was changed to Rumeysa Hayrıdil Hanim. After her cousin Emine who had been renamed Nazikeda, married Şehzade Vahideddin (future Sultan Mehmed VI) in 1885, she became senior lady-in-waiting to her.

She spent most of her life with the family of Sultan Mehmed. Upon the exile of the imperial family in 1924, she accompanied them to San Remo. During the exile she wrote memoirs which give details of the exile, and personality of Sultan Mehmed, titled Sultan Vahdeddinin San Remo Günleri. After Mehmed's death in 1926, she returned to Istanbul, where she died of cancer in 1927.

== See also ==
- Leyla Achba
- Şahinde Hanım

== Sources ==
- Açba, Harun (2007). Kadın efendiler: 1839-1924. Profil. ISBN 978-9-759-96109-1.
- Açba, Leyla (2004). Bir Çerkes prensesinin harem hatıraları. L & M. ISBN 978-9-756-49131-7.
- Aredba, Rumeysa; Açba, Edadil (2009). Sultan Vahdeddin'in San Remo Günleri. Timaş Yayınları. ISBN 978-9-752-63955-3.
