= Leyla Achba =

Abkhazian princess (1898–1931)

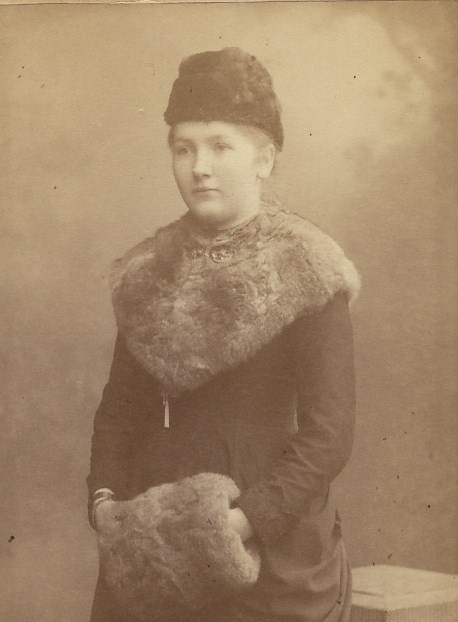
- Born: 10 August 1898; Istanbul, Ottoman Empire (present day Istanbul, Turkey)
- Died: 6 November 1931 (aged 33); Sivas, Turkey
- Burial: Yukarı Tekke, Sivas
Names
- Leyla Gülefşan Achba
- House: Achba
- Father: Mehmed Refik Bey Achba
- Mother: Mahşeref Emukhvari
- Religion: Islam

Leyla Gülefşan Achba (10 August 1898 – 6 November 1931) was an Abkhazian princess. She was a lady-in-waiting to Nazikeda Kadın, wife of Mehmed VI, the last Sultan of the Ottoman Empire. She is known for writing memoirs, which give details of the sultan's court life and was the first Ottoman court lady to write memoirs.

== Life ==
Leyla Achba was born on 10 August 1898 in Achba Mansion, Horhor, Istanbul. She was a member of the Abkhazian princely family, Anchabadze, which had emigrated to Istanbul during the Russo-Turkish War (1877–78). Her father was Prince Mehmed Refik Bey Achba, and her mother was Princess Mahşeref Hanım Emkhaa, daughter of Prince Osman Bey Emukhvari and Princess Hesna Hanım Çaabalurhva.

She had three elder siblings, two brothers, Ahmed Bey, and Rifat Kemaleddin Bey, and a sister, Emine Nurbanu Hanım, and a younger sister, Feride Hanım. She was a paternal great-grandniece of Verdicenan Kadın, a wife of Sultan Abdulmejid I. She was also a maternal niece of Peyveste Hanım, and a paternal cousin of Fatma Pesend Hanım, both wives of Sultan Abdul Hamid II. Her paternal grandmother Ayşe Kemalifer Dziapş-Ipa was the sister of Dürrünev Kadın who was the Senior Consort of Sultan Abdulaziz. Her sister, Nurbanu renamed Hidayet Hanım married Şehzade Mehmed Burhaneddin, son of Sultan Abdülhamid II. Her cousin Nazikeda Kadın was the wife of Sultan Mehmed VI and another cousin Iryale Hanım was a consort of Şehzade Mehmed Selim, son of Sultan Abdülhamid II. Her cousin Princess Mihri Müşfik Hanım was the first female artist in Turkey.

Leyla was educated privately. She could speak French and English fluently, and had a penchant for music.

In 1916, she was engaged to Prince Hüseyin Inalipa. The marriage was supposed to take place two years later on 23 July 1918. However, the marriage didn't take place because of Hüseyin's death twenty days earlier.

In 1919 she entered court service, alongside some of her relatives. Here, her name was changed to Gülefşan, in accordance with the custom of the Ottoman court. She then became fifth lady-in-waiting to Nazikeda Kadın. She served Nazikeda until she, and the rest of Sultan's family were exiled in 1924.

== Death ==
After the Turkish republic was founded, she moved to her aunt in Sivas, where she died of tuberculosis on 6 November 1931. She was buried in Yukarı Tekke.

== Memoirs ==
Shortly before her death she wrote memoirs, which give details of the sultan's court life. Princess Achba was the first Ottoman court lady who wrote memoirs. She intended her memoirs to be reckoning, an account which would bring to light the harsh treatment her family received from the victorious republic.

== Ancestry ==
Ancestors of Leyla Achba

16. Kaytuk Giorgi Achba
8. Ahmed Achba
17. Yelizaveta Hanım
4. Ömer Achba
9. Patıma Eşba
2. Mehmed Refik Achba
10. Mahmud Dziapş-Ipa
5. Ayşe Kemalifer Dziapş-Ipa
11. Halime Çikotua
1. Leyla Achba
6. Osman Eymhaa
3. Maheşref Eymhaa
7. Hesna Çaabalurhva

== See also ==
- Rumeysa Aredba
- Şahinde Hanım

== Bibliography ==
- Açba, Leyla (May 1, 2010). Bir Çerkes Prensesinin Harem Hatıratı. Timaş Yayınları. ISBN 978-605-114-225-8.

== Sources ==
- Açba, Leyla (2004). Bir Çerkes prensesinin harem hatıraları. L & M. ISBN 978-9-756-49131-7.
- Rumeysa Aredba: Sultan Vahdeddinin San Remo Günleri, İstanbul 2009
