= Von Berg =

von Berg in an aristocratic German family, hailing from the Duchy of Berg. It may refer to:

- First rulers of the feudal state of Berg
- Bruno II von Berg (c. 1100–1137), Archbishop of Cologne
- Carl Heinrich Edmund von Berg (1800–1874), German forestry scientist
- Friedrich Wilhelm Rembert von Berg (1793–1874) Governor-General of Finland, Namestnik of the Kingdom of Poland
- Henning von Berg (born 10 June 1961), German photographer
- Karoline Friederike von Berg (1760–1826), German salonist and lady in waiting
- Marquard von Berg (1528–1591), Prince-Bishop of Augsburg
- Otto II (bishop of Freising) (died 17 March 1220), sometimes called Otto von Berg, Bishop of Freising
- Shaun von Berg (born 16 September 1986), South African cricketer.
- Wilfred Clement Von Berg (1894–1978), British architect
- Gunther Heinrich Baron von Berg (1765–1843), German statesman and legislator
- Karl Heinrich Ernst Baron von Berg (1810–1894), Minister of State of the Grand Duchy of Oldenburg
- Gustav Hans Dietrich Baron von Berg (1853–1908), Prussian Major General
- Gunther Hans Dietrich Baron von Berg (1841–1917), Forest Master of Alsace-Lorraine.
