= Şahinde Hanım =

- Born: Kezban Marshania c. 1895; Sivas, Ottoman Empire (present day Sivas, Turkey)
- Died: 15 March 1924 (aged 28–29); Feriye Palace, Istanbul, Turkey
- Burial: Eyüp Cemetery, Istanbul
- House: Marshania
- Father: Abdülkadir Hasan Marshania
- Mother: Mevlüde İnal-lpa
- Religion: Islam

Şahinde Hanım (Ottoman Turkish: شاہندہ خانم; born Princess Kezban Marshania; c. 1895 – 15 March 1924) was an Abkhazian princess. She was a lady-in-waiting to Nazikeda Kadın, wife of Mehmed VI, the last Sultan of the Ottoman Empire.

== Life ==
Şahinde Hanım was born in 1895 in Sivas. Born as Kezban, she was a member of Abkhazian princely family, Marshania. Her father was Prince Abdülkadir Hasan Bey Marshania, (1862 - 1917) an officer in the Ottoman army whose family had migrated from the Caucasus, and her mother was Princess Mevlüde İnal-lpa (1862 - 1937), also an Abkhazian. She had three brothers, Ismail Bey, Ali Bey, and Reşid Bey, and two sisters, Pakize who had been renamed Mislimelek Hanım (1883 - 1955), and Hatice who had been renamed Aşubican Hanım (1891 - 1955).

At a young age, she and her sister were sent to Istanbul to their aunt Nazikeda Kadın, who had been married to then Şehzade Vahideddin (future Sultan Mehmed VI). There, her name was changed to Şahinde, according to the custom of the Ottoman court. She and her sister went on to serve Nazikeda as ladies-in-waiting to her. Sometime later her sister married, and left the palace, while she didn't marry, and continued to serve Nazikeda as second lady-in-waiting.

When Sultan Mehmed was deposed, he went into exile on 17 November 1922, leaving his family behind in Istanbul. During this time the revolutionaries confined Nazikeda along with her ladies-in-waiting, including Şahinde in the Feriye Palace. After Nazikeda also went into exile on 10 March 1924, Şahinde stayed in Istanbul. She was eventually acquitted by the Turkish Parliament. On the day of her release Şahinde was stabbed by a fanatical revolutionary in the street, and died a short time later because of her serious injury on 15 March 1924 in Istanbul. She was buried in Eyüp cemetery.

== Ancestry ==
Ancestors of Şahinde Hanım

8. Ismail Marshania
4. Hasan Ali Marshania
2. Abdülkadir Marshania
5. Fatma Horecan Aredba
1. Şahinde Hanım
3. Mevlüde İnal-Ipa

== See also ==
- Rumeysa Aredba
- Leyla Achba

== Sources ==
- Açba, Leyla (2004). Bir Çerkes prensesinin harem hatıraları. L & M. ISBN 978-9-756-49131-7.
- Aredba, Rumeysa; Açba, Edadil (2009). Sultan Vahdeddin'in San Remo Günleri. Timaş Yayınları. ISBN 978-9-752-63955-3.
