= Ulviye Sultan =

Ottoman princess, daughter of Mehmed VI and Nazikeda Kadın

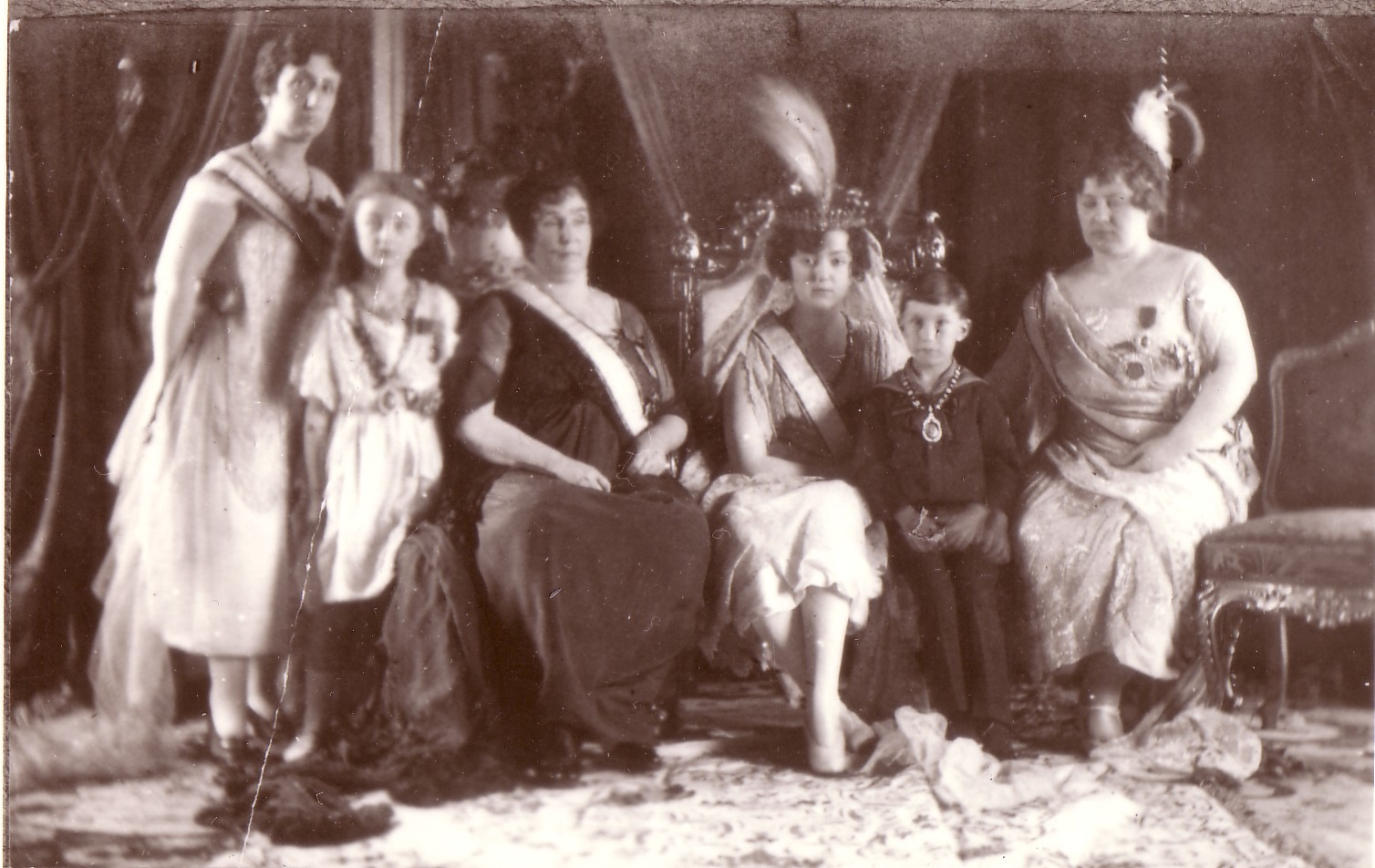
- Ulviye (first from left) at her sister Sabiha Sultan's (third from right) wedding, 29 April 1920
- Born: 11 September 1892; Ortaköy Palace, Ortaköy, Istanbul, Ottoman Empire (now Istanbul, Turkey)
- Died: 25 January 1967 (aged 74); İzmir, Turkey
- Burial: Aşiyan Asri Cemetery, Istanbul, Turkey
- Spouse: Damat Ismail Hakkı Pasha (m. 1916; div. 1922) Damat Ali Haydar Bey (m. 1923)
- Issue: First marriage Suade Hümeyra Hanımsultan
Names
- Turkish: Fatma Ulviye Sultan; Ottoman Turkish: فاطمه علویه سلطان
- Dynasty: Ottoman
- Father: Mehmed VI
- Mother: Nazikeda Kadın
- Religion: Sunni Islam

Fatma Ulviye Sultan (Ottoman Turkish: فاطمه علویه سلطان; 11 September 1892 – 25 January 1967) was an Ottoman princess, the daughter of Sultan Mehmed VI and Nazikeda Kadın.

== Early life ==
Fatma Ulviye Sultan was born on 11 September 1892 in her father's Ortaköy Palace in Ortaköy, Istanbul. Her father was Sultan Mehmed VI, son of Sultan Abdulmejid I and Gülistu Kadın. Her mother was Nazikeda Kadın, the daughter of Prince Hasan Ali Marshania and Princess Fatma Horecan Aredba. She was the second daughter born to her father and mother. She had two sisters, Münire Fenire Sultan, four years older than her who died as a newborn, and Rukiye Sabiha Sultan, two years younger than her. She had a younger half-brother, Şehzade Mehmed Ertuğrul, son of Müveddet Kadın.

Refik Bey, the son of Mihrifelek Hanım, the second kalfa of Sultan Abdulmejid I, was appointed teacher to Ulviye and her younger sister Sabiha Sultan. The two learned to play the piano from Mlle Voçino.

== First marriage ==
In February 1916, after the death of the heir to the throne, Şehzade Yusuf Izzeddin, her father was given the title of the crown prince. By now, Ulviye had reached the age of maturity. Ulviye married Ismail Hakki Pasha, son of the last grand vizier of the Ottoman Empire, Ahmet Tevfik Pasha and his Swiss wife Elisabeth Tschumi, on 10 August 1916, in a yalı in Kuruçeşme. The marriage was performed by Şeyhülislam Hayri Efendi. Her dowry was fixed at 1,000 gold coins. He became a Damat.

The couple settled in the yalı in Kuruçeşme. The two together had a daughter, Suade Hümeyra Hanımsultan, born on 4 June 1917. In October 1920, her father bought two houses for his daughters in Nişantaşı. The mansions were known as the Twin Palaces. He gave one house to Ulviye Sultan and the other to Sabiha. Ulviye divorced her husband on 21 June 1922.

== Second marriage ==
After her divorce, Ulviye married Ali Haydar Bey Germiyanoğlu, son of Zülüflü Ismail Pasha, on 1 November 1923, in the Nişantaşi Palace. He became a Damat. No issue came of this marriage.

In the exile of the imperial family in March 1924, Ulviye, her husband, and her daughter settled in Sanremo, Italy. After her father died in 1926, she moved to Monte Carlo, and in 1929, she relocated to Alexandria, Egypt.

In 1952, Ulviye Sultan and her family returned to Istanbul after the revocation of the law of exile for princesses. Here, she settled in İzmir with her daughter.

== Death ==
Ulviye Sultan died on 25 January 1967 at the age of 74 and was buried in Aşiyan Cemetery, Istanbul.

Her husband outlived her by three years and died in 1970.

== Honours ==
- Order of the House of Osman
- Order of the Medjidie, Jeweled
- Order of Charity, 1st Class

== Issue ==
Name	Birth	Death	Notes
By Ismail Hakkı Pasha (married 10 August 1916 – divorced 21 June 1922; 20 October 1881 – 10 October 1977)
Suade Hümeyra Hanımsultan	4 June 1917	17 May 2000	Born in Istanbul; Married and had issue; Died in Kuşadası, Turkey

== Sources ==
- Bardakçı, Murat (2017). Neslishah: The Last Ottoman Princess. Oxford University Press. ISBN 978-9-774-16837-6.
- Sakaoğlu, Necdet (2008). Bu mülkün kadın sultanları: Vâlide sultanlar, hâtunlar, hasekiler, kadınefendiler, sultanefendiler. Oğlak Yayıncılık. ISBN 978-9-753-29623-6.
- Uluçay, Mustafa Çağatay (2011). Padişahların kadınları ve kızları. Ankara: Ötüken. ISBN 978-9-754-37840-5.
