= A Palace Concert =

Tang dynasty silk painting

- 宮樂圖 (Chinese)
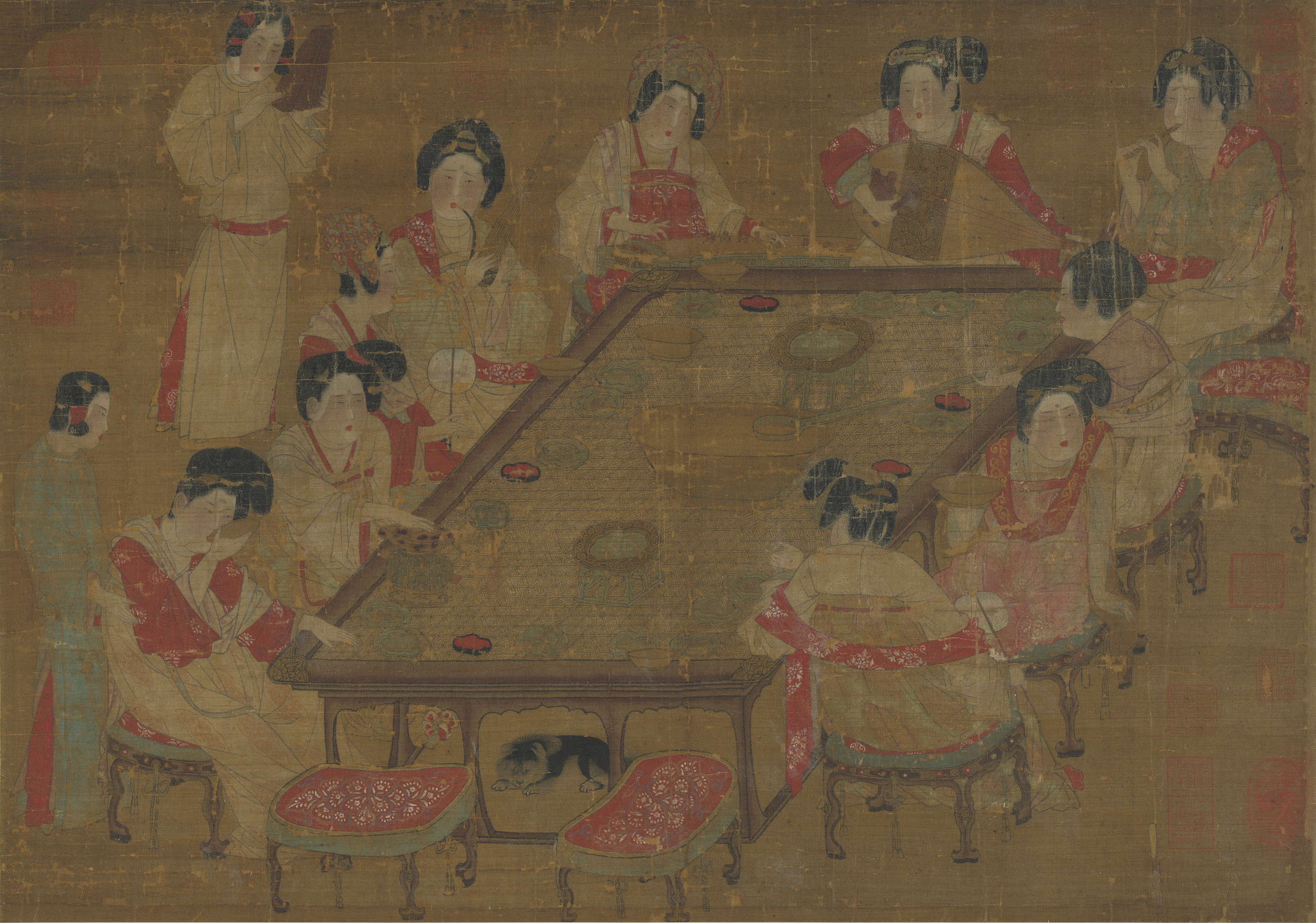
- Artist: Unknown
- Year: Unknown
- Type: Ink and colors on silk
- Dimensions: 48.7 cm × 69.5 cm (19.2 in × 27.4 in)
- Location: National Palace Museum, Taipei

A Palace Concert (Chinese: 宮樂圖) is a Chinese Tang dynasty silk painting showing ten court ladies and two standing servant maidens around a large rectangular table. Some court ladies are depicted drinking tea, while others drink wine. The four women at the far end are presumably responsible for playing music and livening up the mood. The musical instruments depicted, from left to right, are bamboo pipes, guqin, pipa and bili. One of the servant maidens plays a clapper to maintain beat. A small dog is depicted under the table. The artist and the precise year of the painting are unknown. The painting is housed in the National Palace Museum in Taipei, Taiwan.

== Dating ==
The hairstyles are combed in one direction on top, while others are combed in two directions and tied into knots around the ears. In addition to a floral headdress, these all indicate some of the popular Tang dynasty fashions. The woven bamboo table, cusped crescent stools, winged wine cups and the style of the lute playing with a large pick showcase late Tang dynasty customs.

== See also ==
- Tang dynasty painting
