= İsmail Hakkı Okday =

Turkish military commander (1881–1977)

Damat İsmail Hakkı Okday Pasha
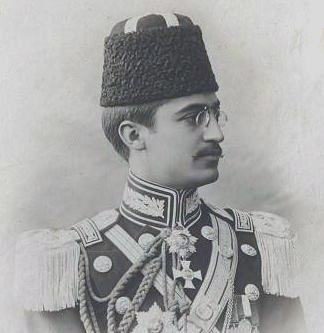
- Born: İsmail Hakkı; 20 October 1881; Athens, Kingdom of Greece
- Died: 10 October 1977 (aged 95); Istanbul, Turkey
- Spouse: Fatma Ulviye Sultan
- Military career
- Allegiance: Ottoman Empire
- Branch: Ottoman Army
- Conflicts: First Balkan War; World War I Turkish War of Independence

İsmail Hakkı Tevfik Okday (20 October 1881 – 10 October 1977) was an Ottoman Turkish military commander, who participated in the First Balkan War. He was the son of the last Grand Vizier of the Ottoman Empire, Ahmed Tevfik Pasha, and married Ulviye Sultana, Mehmed VI's daughter, making him a damat.

== Early life and career ==
He was born in Athens as the son of Ahmet Tevfik Pasha, who was then the Ottoman ambassador to Greece, and later became the last Grand Vizier of the Ottoman Empire. He married Sultan Mehmed VI Vahdeddin's daughter Ulviye Sultana.

=== Education ===
He studied at Galatasaray High School; his education began in his early teens. After completing his officer training at the Military Academy, he was sent to the Prussian Military Academy.

=== Balkan Wars and World War I ===
When the First Balkan War began in 1912 he took a break from training and was tasked to defend Ioannina. He completed his training in Germany to return to the Military Academy which was set up after the Balkan Wars. He served as a staff officer in World War I.

=== Turkish War of Independence ===
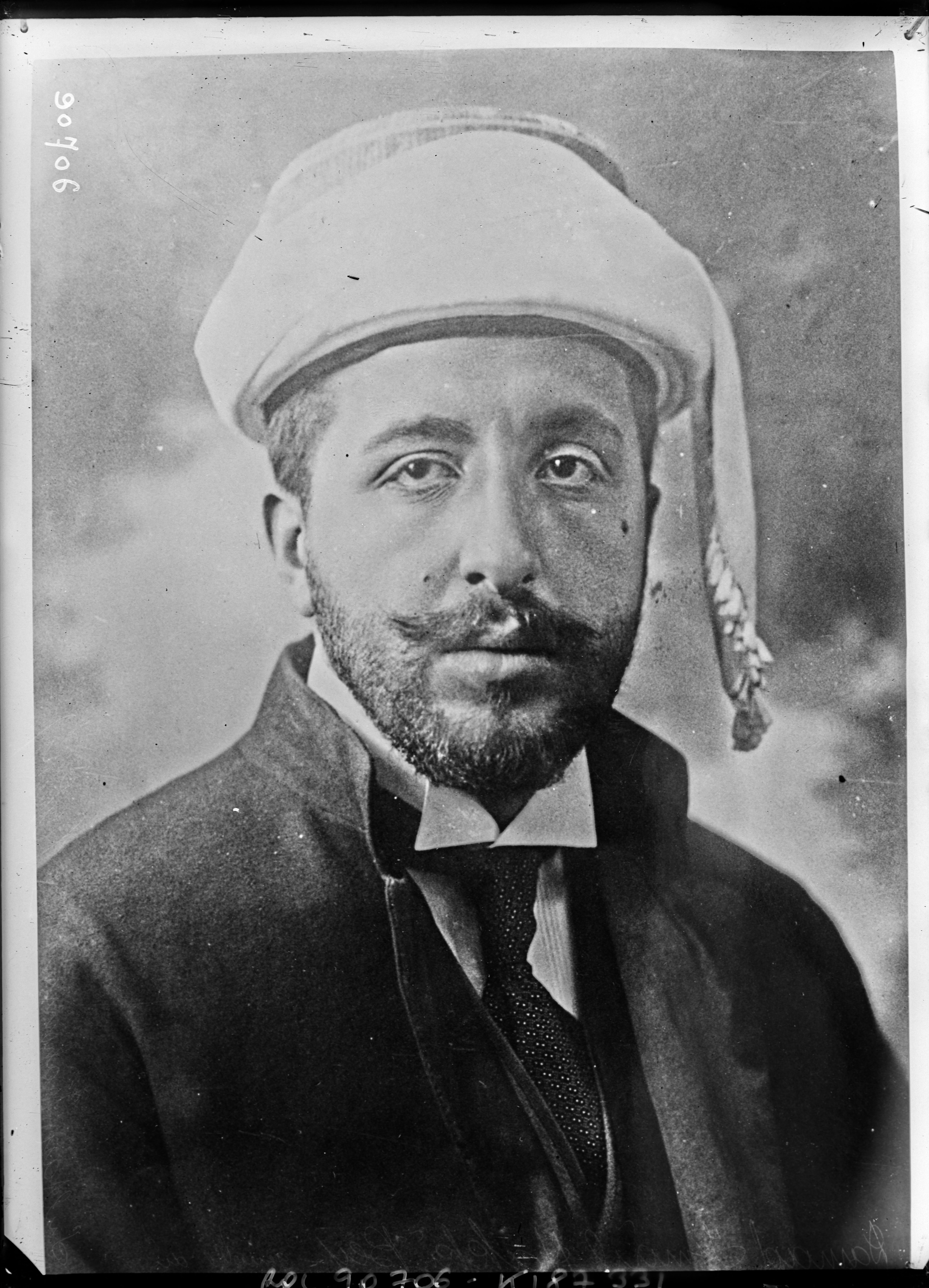
1920s photograph

During the later years of the Turkish War of Independence, he established back channels with the Turkish nationalists, who invited him to join in the upcoming Great Offensive. On 27 January 1922, without informing anyone except his father's chief aid, who also went with him, he escaped from Istanbul to Ankara. Tevfik Pasha, who was then Grand Vizier, knew of his defection plan, but chose to keep quiet, much to the consternation of his sovereign Mehmed VI. Ulviye, having woken up one day without her husband and having not been informed of his defection plan, chose to divorce him and never forgave him.

News of his defection was a propaganda coup for the nationalists, him being a high-ranking officer, damat, and son of the incumbent Grand Vizier.

He served as the Division Chief of Staff and was awarded the Independence Medal with red stripes.

=== Diplomatic career ===
After the war, he entered the Foreign Ministry; as with Moscow, Antwerp, Plovdiv, Bari, Basra, and served as Consul General in Vienna. He remarried with Ferhunde Hanım (Ms. Nazli's aunt, the mother of Bulent Ecevit). He retired from Athens Consulate.

After his retirement he owned and lived in the Park Hotel in Ayaspaşa, where he died in 1977.
