= Karoline Friederike von Berg =

German salonist and lady-in-waiting

Karoline Friederike von Berg (1760–1826), was a German salonist and lady in waiting. She was the confidant of the Prussian queen Louise of Mecklenburg-Strelitz.
