= Lady-in-waiting =

Female personal assistant to a high-ranking noblewoman or royal

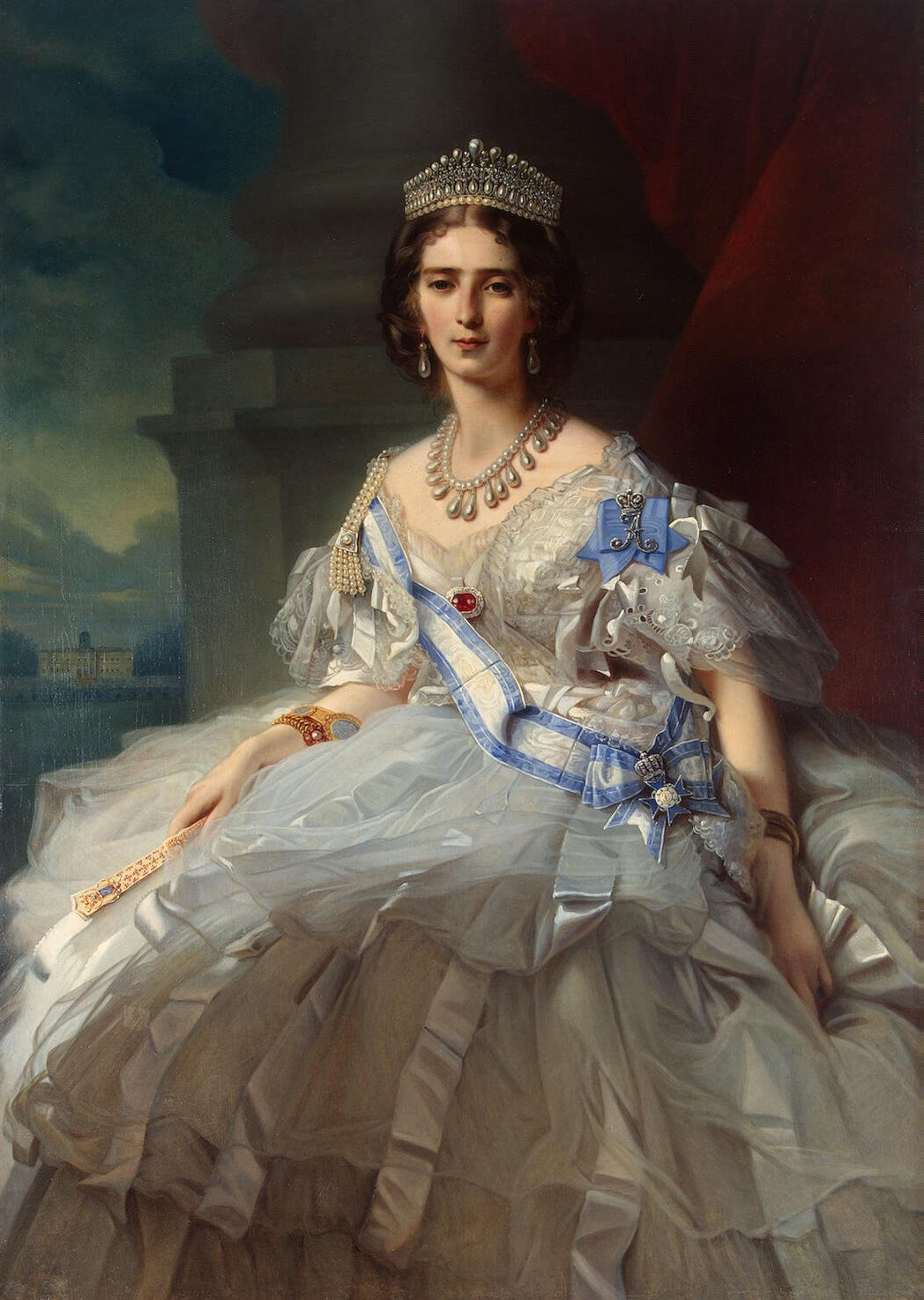
Princess Tatiana Alexandrovna Yusupova, a lady-in-waiting of the Imperial Court of Russia

A lady-in-waiting (alternatively written lady in waiting) or court lady is a female personal assistant at a court, attending on a royal woman or a high-ranking noblewoman. Historically, in Europe, a lady-in-waiting was often a noblewoman but of lower rank than the woman to whom she attended. Although she may or may not have received financial or other compensation for her service, a lady-in-waiting was considered more of a secretary, courtier, or companion to her mistress than a servant.

In some other parts of the world, the lady-in-waiting, often referred to as palace woman, was in practice a servant or a slave rather than a high-ranking woman, but still had the same role, functioning as companion or secretary to her mistress. In courts where polygamy was practiced, a court lady might have been formally available to the monarch for sexual services, and she could become his wife, consort, courtesan, or concubine.

Lady-in-waiting or court lady is often a generic term for women whose relative rank, title, and official functions varied, although such distinctions were also often honorary. A royal woman may or may not be free to select her ladies, and, even when she has such freedom, her choices are usually heavily influenced by the sovereign, her parents, her husband, or the sovereign's ministers (for example, in the Bedchamber crisis).

== History ==
In Europe, the development of the office of lady-in-waiting is connected to that of the development of a royal court. During the Carolingian Empire, in the 9th century, Hincmar describes the royal household of Charles the Bald in the De Ordine Palatii, from 882, in which he states that court officials took orders from the queen as well as the king. Merovingian queens are assumed to have had their personal servants, and in the 9th century it is confirmed that Carolingian queens had an entourage of guards from the nobility as a sign of their rank, and some officials are stated to belong to the queen rather than the king.

In the late 12th century, the queens of France are confirmed to have had their own household, and noblewomen are mentioned as ladies-in-waiting. During the Middle Ages, however, the household of a European queen consort was normally small, and the number of actually employed ladies-in-waiting, rather than wives of noblemen accompanying their husbands to court, was very small: in 1286, the queen of France had only five ladies-in-waiting in her employment, and it was not until 1316 that her household was separated from that of the royal children.

The role of ladies-in-waiting in Europe changed dramatically during the age of the Renaissance, when a new ceremonial court life, where women played a significant part, developed as representation of power in the courts of Italy, and spread to Burgundy, from Burgundy to France, and to the rest of the courts of Europe. The court of the Duchy of Burgundy was the most elaborate in Europe in the 15th century and became an example for France when the French royal court expanded in the late 15th century and introduced new offices for both men and women to be able to answer to the new renaissance ideal.

From small circle of married Femmes and unmarried Filles, with a relatively humble place in the background during the Middle Ages, the number of French ladies-in-waiting were rapidly expanded, divided into an advanced hierarchy with several offices and given an important and public role to play in the new ceremonial court life in early 16th century France. This example was followed by other courts in Europe, when courts expanded and became more ceremonial during the 16th century, and the offices, numbers and visibility of women expanded in the early modern age.

During the late 19th century and the early 20th century, however, most European courts started to reduce their court staff, often due to new economic and political circumstances which made court representation more questionable.

== Duties ==
The duties of ladies-in-waiting varied from court to court, but functions historically discharged by ladies-in-waiting included proficiency in the etiquette, languages, dances, horse riding, music making, and painting prevalent at court; keeping her mistress abreast of activities and personages at court; care of the rooms and wardrobe of her mistress; secretarial tasks; supervision of servants, budget and purchases; reading correspondence to her mistress and writing on her behalf; and discreetly relaying messages upon command.

== By court ==
=== Austria ===
In the late Middle Ages, when the court of the emperor no longer moved around constantly, the household of the empress, as well as the equivalent household of the German princely consorts, started to develop a less-fluid and a more strict organisation with set court offices.

The court model of the Duchy of Burgundy, as well as the Spanish court model, came to influence the organisation of the Austrian imperial court during the 16th century, when the Burgundian Netherlands, Spain and Austria were united through the House of Habsburg. In the early and mid-16th century, the female courtiers kept by female Habsburgs in the Netherlands and Austria was composed of one Hofmesterees (Court Mistress) or Dame d'honneur who served as the principal lady-in-waiting; one Hofdame or Mere de Filles, who was second in rank and deputy of the Hofmesterees, as well as being in charge of the Eredames (Maids of Honour), also known as Demoiselle d'honneur, Fille d'honneur or Junckfrauen depending on language (Dutch, French and Austrian German respectively), and finally the Kamenisters (Chamber Maids). However, during the tenure of Maria of Austria, Holy Roman Empress in the mid-16th century, the court of the empress was organised in accordance with the Spanish court model, and after she left Austria, there was no further household of an empress until the 1610s. This resulted in a mix of Burgundian and Spanish customs when the Austrian court model was created.

In 1619, a set organisation was finally established for the Austrian imperial court, which came to be the characteristic organisation of the Austrian-Habsburg court roughly kept from this point onward. The first rank of the female courtiers was the Obersthofmeisterin (Mistress of the Robes), who was second in rank after the empress herself, and responsible for all the female courtiers. Second rank belonged to the Ayas, essentially governesses of the imperial children and heads of the children's court. Third in rank was the Fräuleinhofmeisterin, who was the replacement of the Obersthofmeisterin when necessary, but otherwise had the responsibility of the unmarried female courtiers, their conduct and service. The rest of the female noble courtiers consisted of the Hoffräulein (Maid of Honour), unmarried women from the nobility who normally served temporarily until marriage. The Hoffräulein could sometimes be promoted to Kammerfräulein (Maid of Honour of the Chamber). The Austrian court model was the role model for the princely courts in Germany. The German court model in turn became the role model of the early modern Scandinavian courts of Denmark and Sweden.

=== Belgium ===
The Kingdom of Belgium was founded in 1830, after which a royal court was founded, and ladies-in-waiting were appointed for Louise of Orléans when she became the first queen of Belgium in 1832. The female officeholders of the queen's household were created after the French model and composed of one Dame d'honneur, followed by several ladies-in-waiting with the title Dame du Palais, in turn ranking above the Première femme de chambre and the Femme de chambre.

The ladies-in-waiting have historically been chosen by the queen herself from the noblewomen of the Catholic Noble Houses of Belgium. The chief functions at court were undertaken by members of the higher nobility, involving much contact with the royal ladies. Belgian princesses were assigned a lady upon their 18th birthdays. Princess Clementine was given a Dame by her father, a symbolic acknowledgement of adulthood. When the queen entertains, the ladies welcome guests and assist the hostess in sustaining conversation.

=== Cambodia ===
In Cambodia, the term ladies-in-waiting refers to high-ranking female servants who served food and drink, fanned and massaged, and sometimes provided sexual services to the king. Conventionally, these women could work their way up from maids to ladies-in-waiting, concubines, or even queen. Srey Snom (Khmer: ស្រីស្នំ) is the Cambodian term for the Khmer lady-in-waiting.

The six favorite court ladies of King Sisowath of Cambodia were probably initially drawn from the ranks of classical royal dancers of the lower class. He was noted for having the most classical dancers as concubines. The imperial celestial dancer, Apsara, was one of these. This practice of drawing from the ranks of royal dancers began in the Golden Age of the Khmer Kingdom.

=== Canada ===
Several Canadian ladies-in-waiting have also been appointed to the Royal Household of Canada. Canadian ladies-in-waiting are typically appointed in order to assist the monarch of Canada when carrying out official duties in Canada and royal tours in the country. Five Canadian ladies-in-waiting were made Lieutenants of the Royal Victorian Order.

=== China ===
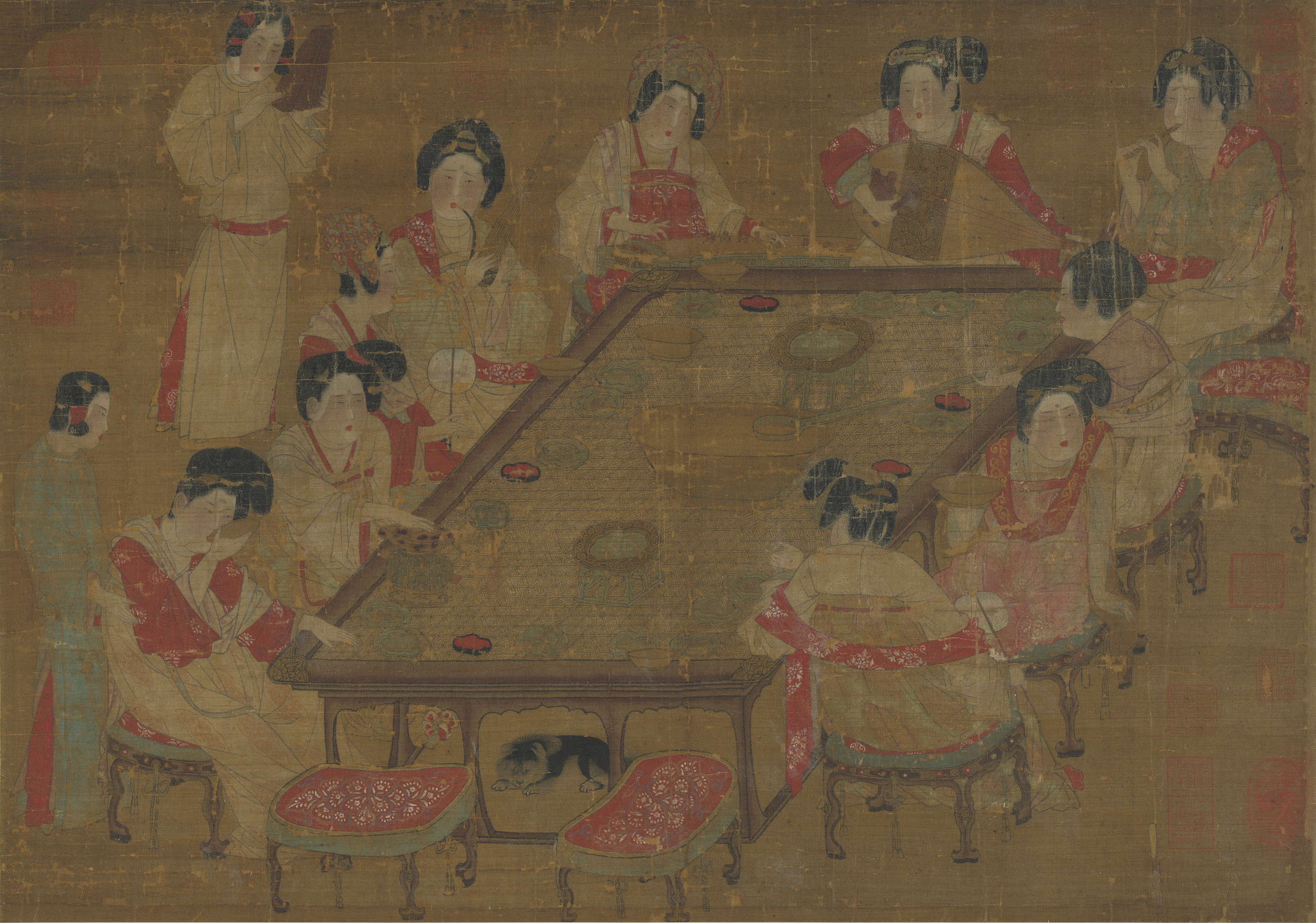
Tang dynasty court ladies on A Palace Concert painting

==== Han ====
The ladies-in-waiting in China, referred to as palace women, palace ladies or court ladies, were all formally, if not always in practice, a part of the emperor's harem, regardless of their task, and could be promoted by him to the rank of official concubine, consort, or even empress.

The emperors of the Han dynasty (202 BC–220 AD) are reported to have had a harem of thousands of 'palace women', although the actual numbers are unconfirmed.

==== Song ====
At least during the Song dynasty (960–1279), palace women were divided in three groups: imperial women (consisting of concubines and consorts), imperial daughters (consisting of daughters and sisters of the emperor), and the female officials and assistants, who performed a wide range of tasks and could potentially be promoted to the rank of concubine or consort.

Women from official elite families could be chosen to become empress, consort or concubine immediately upon their entrance in the palace, but the emperor could also promote any female court official to that post, as they were officially all members of his harem.

The female court officials and attendants were normally selected from trusted families and then educated for their task.

==== Ming ====
During the Ming dynasty (1368–1644), palace women were sorted into roughly the same three categories as in the Song dynasty. However, female officials and assistants in the Ming dynasty were organized into six established government groups, called the Six Bureaus: the Bureau of General Affairs, Bureau of Handicrafts, Bureau of Ceremonies, Bureau of Apartments, Bureau of Apparel, and Bureau of Foodstuffs. These groups were all overseen by the Office of Staff Surveillance, headed by a female official.

Women workers in the imperial palace were distinguished as either permanent or temporary staff. Permanent palace staff included educated and literate female officials serving in the Six Bureaus, and wet nurses caring for imperial heirs or other palace children. These women received great wealth and social acclaim if their jobs were performed well. Seasonal or temporary palace women included midwives, female physicians, and indentured contractors (these were usually women serving as maids to consorts, entertainers, sewing tutors, or sedan-chair bearers). These women were recruited into the palace when necessary and then released following the termination of their predetermined period of service.

Throughout the Ming dynasty, there was frequent movement between the palace service industry and the low levels of the Imperial Harem. Although emperors frequently selected minor consorts from Imperial serving women, few selected women ever reached the higher ranks of the consort structure or gained significant prominence.

As the Ming dynasty progressed, living and working conditions for palace women began to deteriorate. Lower-ranked serving women working in the Imperial palace were often underpaid and unable to buy food, leaving them to support themselves by selling embroidery at the market outside the palace via eunuchs. Overall, living conditions and punishments for misbehaving eventually grew so bad that there was an assassination attempt against the Jiajing Emperor by a group of serving women. Led by palace maid Yang Jinying in 1542, the failed assassination attempt involved several maids sneaking into the emperor's bedchamber as he slept, to strangle him with a curtain cord. The attempt ultimately failed, and all the women involved were put to death, although this type of violent revolt by serving women had never been seen before in the Ming dynasty.

Due to slanderous literary propaganda written and spread by male officials and Confucian authors, higher-class female officials also saw their power begin to weaken throughout the Ming dynasty. These prominent government men began to disparage having educated women in government and state roles in response to the influence Imperial women had held over the nation in the past. This prompted a gradual overtaking of female official roles by palace eunuchs that continued throughout the remainder of the dynasty.

==== Qing ====
The system of palace women continued mostly unchanged during the Qing dynasty (1644–1912), when a class of imperial women acting as consorts or concubines, who had not previously held other roles, existed. However, female court attendants were also all available for promotion to concubinage or the position of consort by the emperor. During the Qing dynasty, imperial women were selected from among the teenage daughters of the Manchu official banner families, who were drafted to an inspection before they could marry. Similarly, palace maids were drafted from lower official and banner classes before they could marry. After their selection, palace maids were educated as personal attendants to consorts, female officials within court rituals or other tasks, and were also available for the emperor to promote to consort or concubine. Below the palace maids were the maidservants, who were selected the same way by a draft among the daughters of soldiers.

=== Denmark ===
The early modern Danish court was organized according to the German court model, in turn inspired by the Austrian imperial court model, from the 16th century onward. The highest rank female courtier to a female royal was the Hofmesterinde (Court Mistress) or, from 1694/98 onward, Overhofmesterinde (Chief Court Mistress), equivalent to the Mistress of the Robes, normally an elder widow, who supervised the rest of the ladies-in-waiting. The rest of the female courtiers were mainly Kammerfrøken (Senior Maid of Honour), followed by a group of Hofdame (Court Lady) and the Hoffrøken (Maid of Honour). They were followed by the non-noble female court employees not ranking as ladies-in-waiting, such as the chambermaids.

This hierarchy was roughly in place from the 16th century until the death of King Christian IX of Denmark in 1906. During the 20th century, most of these titles came of use, and all ladies-in-waiting at the royal Danish court are now referred to as Hofdame (Court Lady).

=== France ===
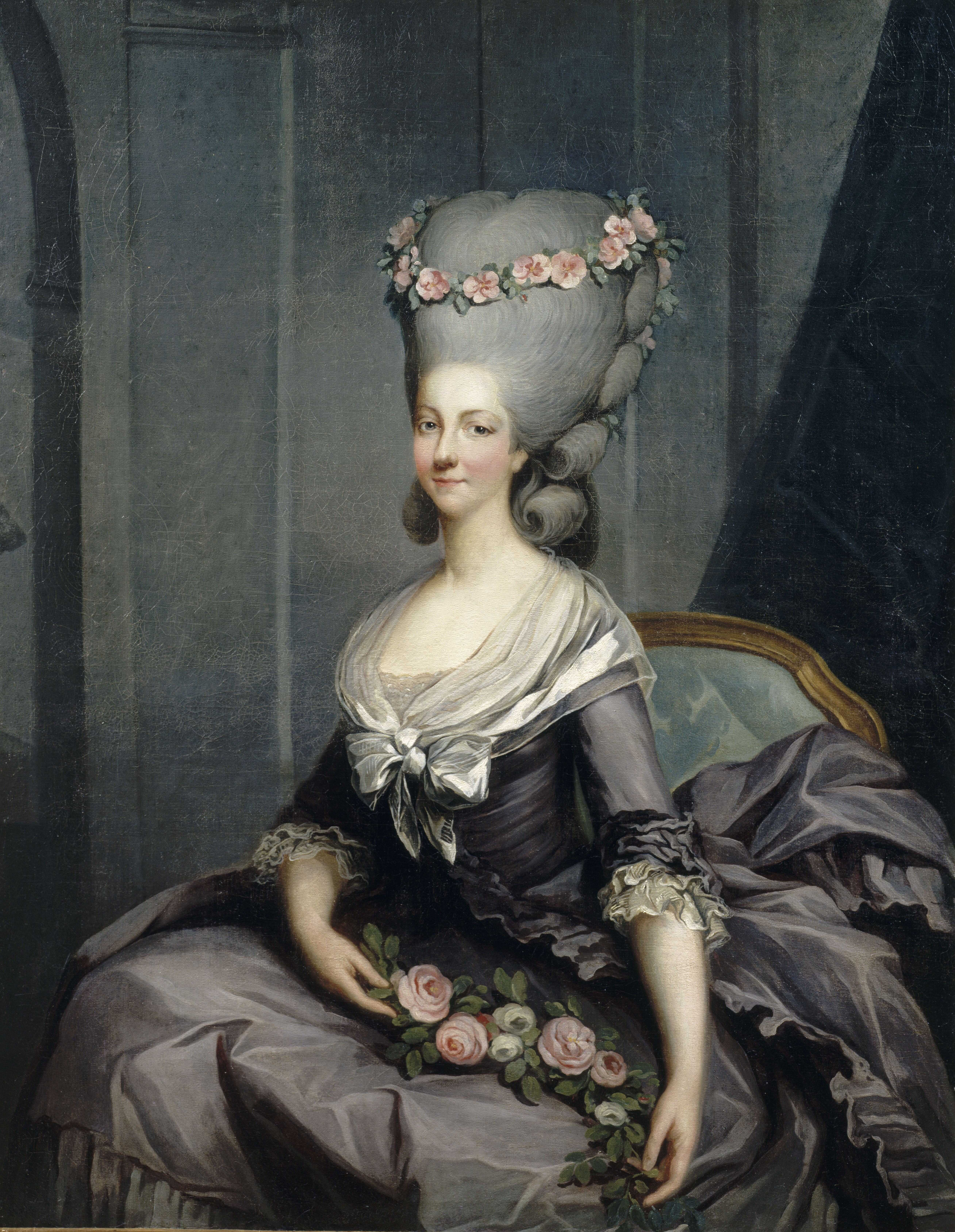
Marie Louise of Savoy-Carignan, Princesse de Lamballe was chief lady-in-waiting to Queen Marie Antoinette of France

The queen of France is confirmed to have had a separate household in the late 12th century, and an ordinance from 1286 notes that Joan I of Navarre, Queen of France, had a group of five ladies (Dames) and maids-in-waiting (Damoiselles). In the 1480s, the French ladies-in-waiting were divided into Femmes Mariées (married ladies-in-waiting) and Filles d'honneur (Maids of Honour). However, the queen's household and the number of female courtiers during the Middle Ages was very small in France, as in most European courts.

It was not until the end of the 15th century and early 16th century that emulation of the new courts of the Italian Renaissance made ladies-in-waiting fashionable in official court ceremonies and representation, and female court offices became more developed and numerous in the French court as well as in other European courts. The introduction of ladies-in-waiting increased in great numbers at the French court at this time: from a mere five in 1286 and still only 23 in 1490, to 39 in 1498 and roughly 54 during the 16th century. This expansion of female presence at court has been attributed to both Anne of Brittany, who encouraged all male courtiers to send their daughters to her, and to Francis I of France, who was criticized for bringing to court "the constant presence" of large crowds of women, who gossiped and interfered in state affairs. Francis I once said: "a court without ladies is a court without a court".

- The first ranked female courtier in the French royal court was the Surintendante de la Maison de la Reine (Mistress of the Robes) to the queen. The Surintendante and the Governess of the Children of France were the only female office holders in France to give an oath of loyalty to the king himself. This office was created in 1619, and was vacant from the death of Marie Anne de Bourbon, in 1741, until the appointment of Marie Louise of Savoy-Carignan, Princesse de Lamballe, in 1775.
- The second highest rank was that of the Première dame d'honneur, who could act as the stand-in of the Surintendante and had roughly the same tasks, hiring and supervising the female courtiers and the queen's daily routine and expenditure. This post was created in 1523 and had originally been the highest female court office.
- The third rank belonged to the Dame d'atour, who formally supervised the queen's wardrobe and jewelry and the dressing of the queen. This post was created in 1534.
- The fourth rank was that of the dames, from 1523 named Dame d'honneur, composed of ladies-in-waiting whose task was simply to serve as companions and attending and assisting with court functions. The position was abolished in 1674, and replaced by the Dame du palais, 12 married noblewomen with the same tasks.
- The fifth rank was the Filles d'honneur or Demoiselles d'honneur (Maids of Honour), unmarried daughters of the nobility, who had the same tasks as the dames, but were mainly placed at court to learn etiquette and look for a spouse. They were supervised by the Gouvernante and the Sous-gouvernante. The Filles were from 1531 supervised by the Gouvernante de Filles, a lady-in-waiting who had the task to chaperone them: this post was divided into several from 1547 onward. The position of Filles d'honneur was abolished in 1674.
- The sixth rank was the Première femme de chambre, who in turn outranked the remaining Femme de Chambres and Lavandières. The Premiere femme de chambre had the keys to the queen's rooms and could recommend and deny audiences to her, which in practice made her position very powerful at court.

During the First Empire, the principal lady-in-waiting of the empress was the Dame d'honneur, followed by between 20 and 36 Dames du Palais. During the Bourbon Restoration, Marie Thérèse of France restored the pre-revolutionary court hierarchy. During the Second Empire, the female courtiers of the empress were composed of the first rank, Grand Maitresse, and the second rank, Dame d'honneur, followed by six (later twelve) Dames du Palais.

=== Germany ===
The early modern princely courts in Germany were modeled after the Austrian imperial court model. This court model divided the ladies-in-waiting in a chief lady-in-waiting named Oberhofmeisterin (a widowed or married elder woman) who supervised the Hoffräulein (Maids of Honour), of which one or two could be promoted to the middle rank of Kammerfräulein (Maid of Honour of the Chamber). The German princely courts in turn became the role model of the Scandinavian courts of Denmark and Sweden in the 16th century.

After the end of the German Holy Roman Empire in 1806, and the establishment of several minor kingdoms in Germany, the post of Staatsdame (married ladies-in-waiting) were introduced in many German princely and royal courts. At the imperial German court, the ladies-in-waiting were composed of one Oberhofmeisterin in charge of several Hofstaatsdamen or Palastdamen.

=== Greece ===
==== Byzantine Empire ====
During the Byzantine Empire, the Byzantine empress was attended by a female court (the Sekreton Tōn Gynaikōn), which consisted mostly of the wives of high-ranking male court officials, who simply used the feminine versions of their husbands' titles. The only specifically female dignity was that of the Zoste patrikia, the chief lady-in-waiting and female attendant of the empress, who was the head of the women's court and often a relative of the empress; this title existed at least since the 9th century.

==== Kingdom of Greece ====
The Kingdom of Greece was established in 1832 and its first queen, Amalia of Oldenburg, organized the ladies-in-waiting of its first royal court with one 'Grande Maitresse', followed by the second rank 'Dame d'honneur', and the third rank 'Dame de Palais'.

During the tenure of Queen Olga, the earlier titles for the ladies-in-waiting were kept as one Grande Maîtresse or Grand Mistress (Chief Lady of the Household); one Dame d'honneur (Lady of Honour), eight Dame de Palais (Lady of the Palace) and Demoiselle d'honneur (Maid of Honour), and also introduced a court costume for the ladies-in-waiting.

=== Italy ===
Historically, Italy was divided into different principalities prior to unification, representing different forms of ladies-in-waiting. During the Renaissance, the public representation of princely courts expanded. The staff of the Princely court expanded in order to accommodate this new art of representation, as did the number and offices of women employed at court. The princely Italian courts in Ferrara, Parma and Florence all developed in accordance with the same pattern. The princely Renaissance courts became the role model of bigger royal courts of Western Europe.

==== Este of Ferrara and Modena ====
The court of Isabella d'Este of the Marquisate of Mantua in Ferrara around 1500 is one of the most well documented in the Renaissance, a period when the Italian courts became role models for the courts in Western Europe. The ladies-in-waiting in the Household of Isabella d'Este were headed by the Dama di corte, the married noblewomen who acted as her assistants and as members of her public entourage, and the Damigella, which was the title for unmarried women and girls in the same position. The Cameriera were women who were not necessarily of noble birth and who attended to the practical tasks and work of the Duchess's chamber, while the title Compagna was a general title for a woman who was a part of the Duchess's entourage.

The Este Court of Ferrara had a similar organisation as the courts of Florence and Parma, and became more strictly formalized.

==== Grand Duchy of Tuscany ====
During the tenure of Vittoria della Rovere as Grand Duchess of Tuscany, the hierarchy of ladies-in-waiting were the Dama di corte or dame di corte (lady of the court), which were normally the ladies-in-waiting of noble rank; the Dama d'onore (lady of honour), who were honorary ladies-in-waitings; the Cameriera (chamber lady); Damigella (maid of honour); and Aia (governess).

==== Kingdom of Naples and the Two Sicilies ====
Prior to the unification, the greatest of the Italian states was the Kingdom of Naples, later called Kingdom of the Two Sicilies.

When the Kingdom of Naples became an independent Kingdom again in 1735, a new Household was created for the new queen, Maria Amalia of Saxony, called Casa della Regina. Her chief-lady-in-waiting was the Cameriera maggiore; the second rank was the noblewomen known as Dame di corte, who in turn overranked the Cameriere or cameriere della regina (ladies maids) and Cameriste (chamber maids).

The Casa della Regina of the next queen, Maria Carolina of Austria, was somewhat expanded, including also the Dame d'onore, honorary ladies-in-waiting ranked below Dame di Corte and above the Donne di camera or Donne della camera, ladies-in-waitings of the queen's privat chamber, aside from the royal governesses, who were called Aie.

In 1842, the ladies-in-waiting of the queen of the Two Sicilies were composed of one Dama di Onore (Lady of Honor, ranked just below the Cavaliere di Onore), three Dama di Compagnia (Lady Companions, ranked below the Cavalerizzo), and a large number of Dame di Corte (Court Ladies).

==== Kingdom of Italy ====
In 1861, the Italian Peninsula was united in to the Kingdom of Italy. The ladies-in-waiting of the queen of Italy were headed by the Dama d'Onore, followed by the Dame di Corte, and finally the Dame di Palazzo. The Dama d'Onore was nominally the chief lady-in-waiting, but in practice often limited her service to state occasions; the Dame di Corte was the regular lady-in-waiting who personally attended to the queen, while the Dame di Palazzo were honorary courtiers attached to the royal palaces in particular cities, such as Florence, Turin, and so forth, and only served temporary when the queen visited the city in question: among these, only the Dame di Palazzo attached to the royal palace of the capital of Rome served more than temporary.

=== Japan ===
In Japan, the imperial court offices were normally reserved for members of the court aristocracy and the ladies-in-waiting or 'palace attendants' were commonly educated members of the nobility.

During the Heian period (794–1185) women could hold court offices of substantial responsibility, managing the affairs of the emperor. Female palace attendants were employed by the Imperial Bureau of Palace Attendants from among the court aristocracy, but were required to have sufficient education in Chinese classics to be accepted.

During the Sengoku period (1467–1603), the highest rank of a lady-in-waiting was the 'Female Assistant to the Major Counselor', who ran the affairs of the daily life of the Imperial Household. The second rank was Koto No Naishi (Female Palace Attendant), who acted as intermediary between the emperor and those seeking an audience and issued his wishes in writing. Ladies-in-waiting acted as imperial secretaries and noted the events at court, visitors and gifts in the official court journals.

In contrast to China, female palace attendants managed the palace of the imperial harem rather than eunuchs, and could hold high court offices in the emperor's personal household.

Female palace attendants were divided into two classes, which in turn had several ranks, signifying their task. The first class consisted of the nyokan, or ladies-in-waiting who held court offices: naishi-kami (shoji) naishi-suke (tenji) and naishi-no-jo (shoji). The second class were the female palace attendants: myobu, osashi, osue and nyoju. The ladies-in-waiting worked as personal assistants, tending to the emperor's wardrobe, assisting the emperor's baths, serving meals, performing and attending court rituals. Ladies-in-waiting could be appointed as concubines, consorts or even empresses by the emperor or the heir to the throne. The function of a lady-in-waiting as potential concubine was abolished in 1924.

=== Korea ===
Gungnyeo (literally 'palace women') is a term that refers to women who worked in the palace and waited upon the king and other members of the royal family. It is short for Gungjung Yeogwan, which translates to 'woman officer of the royal court'.

Gungnyeo consisted of the ladies-in-waiting—both high-ranking court ladies and the ordinary maids (known as nain) responsible for most of the labour work—who were divided into ranks from 9 to 5 (the ranks from 4 to 1 were the official concubines of the king), with two levels each (senior and junior), the highest attainable rank being sanggung (senior 5th), as well as other types of working women who were not included in the classification, such as musuri (women from the lowest class who did odd jobs, such as drawing water and distributing firewood), gaksimi (also known as bija and bangja, who were personal servants of a sanggung), sonnim (literally translated to 'guest', were maids brought in the palace to work for the royal concubines, most of the time connected to the families of the concubines) and uinyeo (selected from public female slaves, they worked at the royal infirmary or public clinics, and practiced simple medicine skills).

Generally, the ladies-in-waiting were chosen from among the young girls of the sangmin (commoners) and the private female slaves of the sadaebu (governing class). Later, the candidates were also picked from among the government slaves, together with the daughters of noblemen's concubines (who were former courtesans or slaves). The appointment process was different for nain associated with the inner quarters for the king and queen, who were recruited by the high ranked court ladies themselves, through recommendations and connections. The nain for the departments with specific skills such as sewing and embroidery were from the jungin (middle class), with the lowest class of gungnyeo coming from the cheonmin (vulgar commoners).

They could be as young as 4 when entering the palace, and after learning court language and etiquette, they could be elevated to a nain. When they had served the court for more than 15 years, they would eventually be promoted to higher ranks; however, they were eligible for the rank of sanggung only after a minimum of 35 years of work.

Ladies-in-waiting could become concubines if the king favored them. They would be elevated to the highest rank (senior 5th) and would be known as seungeun sanggung (or 'favored/special court lady'). If they gave birth to a son, they would become members of the royal family, after being promoted to sug-won (junior 4th) and until the 18th century, they could advance as high as becoming queen (the most notable example being Jang Ok-jeong, a concubine of Sukjong of Joseon and mother of Gyeongjong of Joseon).

=== The Netherlands ===
The court of the Duchy of Burgundy, which was situated in the Netherlands in the 15th century, was famous for its elaborate ceremonial court life and became a role model for several other courts of Europe. The Burgundian court model came to be the role model for the Austrian imperial court during the 16th century, when the Burgundian Netherlands and Austria were united through the Habsburg dynasty.

In the 16th century, the ladies-in-waiting in the courts of the Habsburg governors of the Netherlands, Margaret of Austria and Mary of Hungary, were composed of one Hofmeesteres (Court Mistress) or Dame d'honneur who served as the principal lady-in-waiting; one Hofdame or Mere de Filles, who was second in rank and deputy of the Hofmeesteres as well as being in charge of the Eredames (Maids of Honour), also known as Demoiselle d'honneur, Fille d'honneur or Junckfrauen, and finally the Kameniersters (Chamber Maids), all with different titles depending on language in the multilingual area of the Netherlands.

The Kingdom of the Netherlands was founded in 1815, signifying the organisation of a royal court. In the 19th century, the ladies-in-waiting of the Dutch court were headed by the Grootmeesteres (Grand Mistress, equivalent to Mistress of the Robes), of second rank were the Dames du Palais (married ladies-in-waiting), followed by the third rank Hofdames (Court Ladies, equivalent to Maids of Honour).

Beatrix of the Netherlands had a total of seven Hofdames. They accompanied the queen and the other female members of the Royal House during visits and receptions at the royal court. The monarch paid for their expenses, but they did not receive any salary. Not all of these ladies were members of the Dutch aristocracy, but each had a "notable" husband. Excellent social behavior and discretion were the most important recommendations for becoming a Hofdame. In 2012, the Hofdames were Letje van Karnebeek-van Lede, Lieke Gaarlandt-van Voorst van Beest, Julie Jeekel-Thate, Miente Boellaard-Stheeman, Jonkvrouwe Reina de Blocq van Scheltinga, Elizabeth Baroness van Wassenaer-Mersmans and Bibi Baroness van Zuylen van Nijevelt, Jonkvrouwe den Beer Poortugael. Queen Maxima reduced the number of Hofdames to three, hers being: Lieke Gaarlandt-van Voorst van Beest, Pien van Karnebeek-Thijssen and Annemijn Crince le Roy-van Munster van Heuven. After their voluntary retirement, Hofdames were appointed to the honorary royal household. The honorary royal household still distinguishes between Dames du Palais and Hofdames, but the category Dames du Palais is slated for discontinuation.

The Grootmeesteres (Grandmistress) is the highest-ranking lady at the royal court. From 1984 until 2014, the position was held by Martine van Loon-Labouchere, descendant of the famous banker family, a former diplomat and the widow of Jonkheer Maurits van Loon of the famous Amsterdam canal estate. The current Grootmeesteres is Bibi Countess van Zuylen van Nijevelt-den Beer Poortugael (lady-in-waiting between 2011 and 2014).

=== Nigeria ===
A number of tribes and cultural areas in the African continent, such as the Lobedu people of Southern Africa, had a similar custom of ladies-in-waiting in historic times.

As a further example, within certain pre-colonial states of the Bini and Yoruba peoples in Nigeria, the queen mothers and high priestesses were considered "ritually male" due to their social eminence. As a result of this fact, they were often attended to by women who belonged to their harems in much the same way as their actually male counterparts were served by women who belonged to theirs. Although these women effectively functioned as ladies-in-waiting, were often members of powerful families of the local nobility in their own right, and were not usually used for sexual purposes, they were nonetheless referred to as their principals' "wives".

=== Norway ===
During the Danish–Norwegian union, from 1380 until 1814, the Danish royal court in Copenhagen was counted as the Norwegian royal court, and thus there was no royal court present in Norway during this period. During the union between Norway and Sweden from 1814 to 1905, there were Norwegian courtiers who served during the Swedish royal family's visits to Norway. The female courtiers were appointed according to the Swedish court model, that is to say the class of Hovfröken (Maid of Honour), Kammarfröken (Chief Maid of Honour) and Statsfru (Lady of the Bedchamber), all supervised by the Overhoffmesterinne (Mistress of the Robes): these posts were first appointed in 1817. When the union between Sweden and Norway was dissolved in 1905, a permanent Norwegian royal court was established.

=== Ottoman Empire ===
In the Ottoman Empire, the word lady-in-waiting or court lady has often been used to describe those women of the Imperial Harem who functioned as servants, secretaries, and companions of the consorts (concubines), daughters, sisters and mothers of the Ottoman Sultan. These women originally came to the Harem as slaves, captured through the Crimean slave trade, the Barbary slave trade and the White slave trade. When they entered the Harem, they were given the position of Cariye and were all formally available as concubines to the Sultan, but if they were not chosen to share his bed, they served in a position similar to lady-in-waiting, serving the mother, concubines, sisters, and daughters of the Sultan.

The (enslaved) ladies-in-waiting of the Ottoman Imperial harem were collectively known as kalfa, of different ranks. Each royal and royal concubine had their own household staff of kalfa; a kalfa serving as the servant of the sultan himself was titled Hünkar Kalfalari. A Hazinedar or Hazinedar Usta was a kalfa with special assignments rather than just an ordinary attendant, and was ranked under the Hazinedar Usta. All kalfa belonging to the same household within the court were ranked under their Daire Kalfasi, who was the supervisor of the kalfa's belonging to a specific royal person. All Daire Kalfasi of the harem were rankend under the Büyük Kalfa, who in turn was the supervisor of all the Daire Kalfasi of the court. The highest ranked kalfa was the Saray Ustas, who supervised all the kalfa of the entire court (harem).

=== Poland ===
In 17th century Poland, the Queen's Household mirrored that of the King, but was smaller. The Female Household of the Queen was termed as Fraucimer or fraucymer (German: Frauenzimmer). While the queen's male courtiers were supervised by the Ochmistrz (magister curiae) and her female courtiers were supervised by Ochmistrzyni. The Ochmistrzyni was defined as a state office and it was the only state office in Poland prior to the partition of Poland which was held by a woman. She was always to be a noblewoman married to a nobleman of senatorial rank.

The Ochmistrzyni supervised the Panna dworska (maid of honour). The queen's court was a larger version of the courts of the Polish magnate noblewomen, and it was the custom in the Polish nobility to send their daughters to the household of another noblewoman or the queen herself in order become educated and find someone to marry. There were also a category of married noblewomen such as Klara Izabella Pacowa, who could serve under the title Damy dworu or damy dworskie.

Below the noblewomen were the pokojowa (chamber maid); the służąca (maidservant); the bona (governesses) and the mamka (wetnurse).

=== Portugal ===
The female staff of the Household of the Queen of Portugal, Casa da Rainha, was in the period of 1750–1781 headed by the Camareira-mor, a position of such prestige that the noblewoman who was appointed to it may receive the title Duchess upon her appointment, if she did not already possess it. The royal princesses had a lady-in-waiting with an equivalent position, who was titled Camareira da Princesa and placed imemdiately after the Camareira-mor.

The second highest rank was that of the Donas de Honra, an honorary position given to noblewoman of high rank; the third were Damas do Paço, married noblewomen who actively served as the queen's companion and accompanied her in public during representational duties (unmarried lades-in-waitings were called Meninas da vela). The fourth rank were the Donas da Câmara, who were the chamber ladies who swerved the queen with private tasks in her private rooms; and the fifth were the Açaftas, who dressed and undressed the queen and supervised her wardrobe staff.

Under the noblewomen surved women who did not have to have noble rank, such as the Moças de Câmara (chamber maids), the Moças da Retrete or Retretas (queen's maids), Moças do Lavor (the queen's seamstresses), the Moças do Quarto (maids), the Porteiras or Donas da Porta (the women who guarded the admittance to the queen's quarters), the Mulheres de Leite (the royal childre'ns wet nurses) and the Parteiras (the midwives).

The court register of 1896 noted the Camareira-mór as the senior of all the ladies-in-waiting of the Portuguese court, followed by the Dama Camarista Mulher do mordomo mór de S. a Rainha, and the Dama honoraria Mulher do mestre sala. All three positions were at that date occupied by one person. The fourth rank was the Dona camarista (there were five in 1896), and the lowest rank of ladies-in-waiting was the Dona honoraria, of which there were 21 in 1896.

=== Russia ===
In the Court of Muscovite Russia, the offices of ladies-in-waiting to the tsarina were normally divided among the boyarinas (widows or wives of boyars), often from the family and relatives of the tsarina. The first rank among the offices of the ladies-in-waiting was the tsarina's treasurer. The second was the group of companions. The third were the royal nurses to the princes and princesses (where the nurses of the male children outranked); among the nurses, the most significant post was that of the mamok, the head royal governess, who was normally selected from elder widows, often relatives to the tsar or tsarina. All offices were appointed by royal decree. The group of ladies-in-waiting were collectively above the rank of the svetlichnaya (the tsarina's sewing women), the postelnitsy (the tsarina's chamber women and washing women) and the officials who handled the affairs of the staff.

In 1722, this system was abolished and the Russian imperial court was reorganized in accordance with the reforms of Peter the Great to westernize Russia, and the old court offices of the tsarina were replaced with court offices inspired by the German model.

=== Spain ===
The royal court of Castile included a group of ladies-in-waiting for the queen named Camarera in the late 13th century and early 14th century, but it was not until the 15th century that a set organisation of the ladies-in-waiting is confirmed. This characteristic organisation of the Spanish ladies-in-waiting, roughly established during the reign of Isabella I of Castile (r. 1474–1504), was kept by Isabella of Portugal, Holy Roman Empress and Queen of Spain, during the 16th century, and became the standard Spanish court model for ladies-in-waiting.

- The highest rank female courtier was the Camarera Mayor de Palacio (Mistress of the Robes). This office is confirmed from the 1410s.
- The second rank was shared by the Aya (royal governess), and the Guardas (chaperones).
- The third rank was the Dueñas de Honor, the married ladies-in-waiting, who were responsible for not only the unmarried Damas or Meninas (Maids of honour), but also for the female slaves and dwarfs, who were classified as courtiers and ranked before the Mozas (maids) and Lavanderas (washer women).

=== Sweden ===
The early modern Swedish court, as well as the Danish equivalent, were re-organized in the early 16th century according to the German court model, in turn inspired by the Austrian imperial court model. This model roughly organized the female noble courtiers in the class of the unmarried Hovfröken (Maid of Honour, until 1719 Hovjungfru) which could be promoted to Kammarfröken (Chief Maid of Honour, until 1719 Kammarjungfru). They were supervised by the Hovmästarinna (Court Mistress, equivalent to Mistress of the Robes), normally a married or widowed elder noblewoman. Under this class of female noble courtiers, were the non-noble female servants. They were headed by the normally married Kammarfru (Mistress of the Chamber, roughly equivalent to a Lady's Maid), often of burgher background, who supervised the group of Kammarpiga (Chamber Maids).

From the reign of Queen Christina, the Hovmästarinna was supervised by the Överhovmästarinna (Chief Court Mistress). In 1774, the post of Statsfru (Mistress of the State) was introduced, which was the title for the group of married ladies-in-waiting with a rank between the Hovmästarinna and the Kammarfröken. The Swedish court staff was reduced in size in 1873. The new court protocols of 1911 and 1954 continued this reduction, and many court posts were abolished or no longer filled.

With the exception of the Statsfru and the Överhovmästarinna, none of the titles above are in use today. At the death of Queen Louise in 1965, her Överhovmästarinna was employed by the king. From 1994, the Överhovmästarinna is the head of the court of the king rather than the queen, while the court of the queen is headed by the Statsfru. There is now only one Statsfru, and the other ladies-in-waiting are simply referred to as Hovdam (Court Lady). Queen Silvia of Sweden has only three Hovdamer (Court Ladies). Her chief lady-in-waiting is the Statsfru.

=== United Kingdom ===
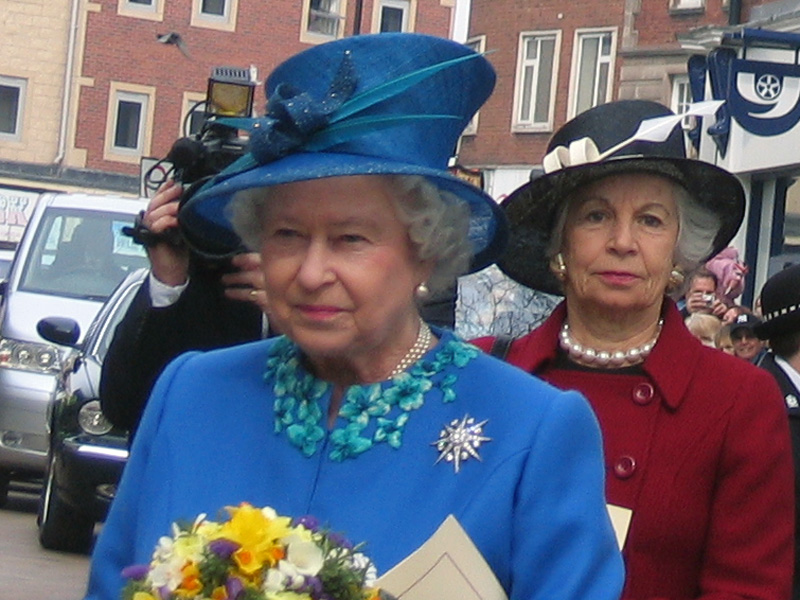
The Countess of Airlie (right), a Lady of the Bedchamber, accompanying Queen Elizabeth II as her lady-in-waiting (March 2005).

In the Royal Households of the United Kingdom, a lady-in-waiting is a woman attending a female member of the royal family. Ladies-in-waiting are routinely appointed by junior female members of the royal family, to accompany them on public engagements and provide other support and assistance.

On more formal occasions ladies in waiting wear a badge of office, which usually takes the form of a jewelled or enamelled monogram of the relevant member of the royal family beneath the appropriate crown or coronet, suspended from a coloured ribbon.

Prior to the Accession of Charles III, a woman attending on a queen (whether queen regnant, queen consort or queen dowager) was also often referred to as a lady-in-waiting (including in official notices), although she would more formally be called either a woman of the bedchamber or a lady of the bedchamber (depending on which of these offices she held). The senior lady of a queen's household was the mistress of the robes, who (as well as being in attendance herself on occasion) was responsible for arranging all the duties of the queen's ladies in waiting.

==== Queen Elizabeth II ====
During the reign of Queen Elizabeth II, one of the women of the bedchamber was always in daily attendance; each served for a fortnight at a time, in rotation. In the Court Circular the phrase 'Lady in Waiting to the Queen' referred to the women on duty at a given time.

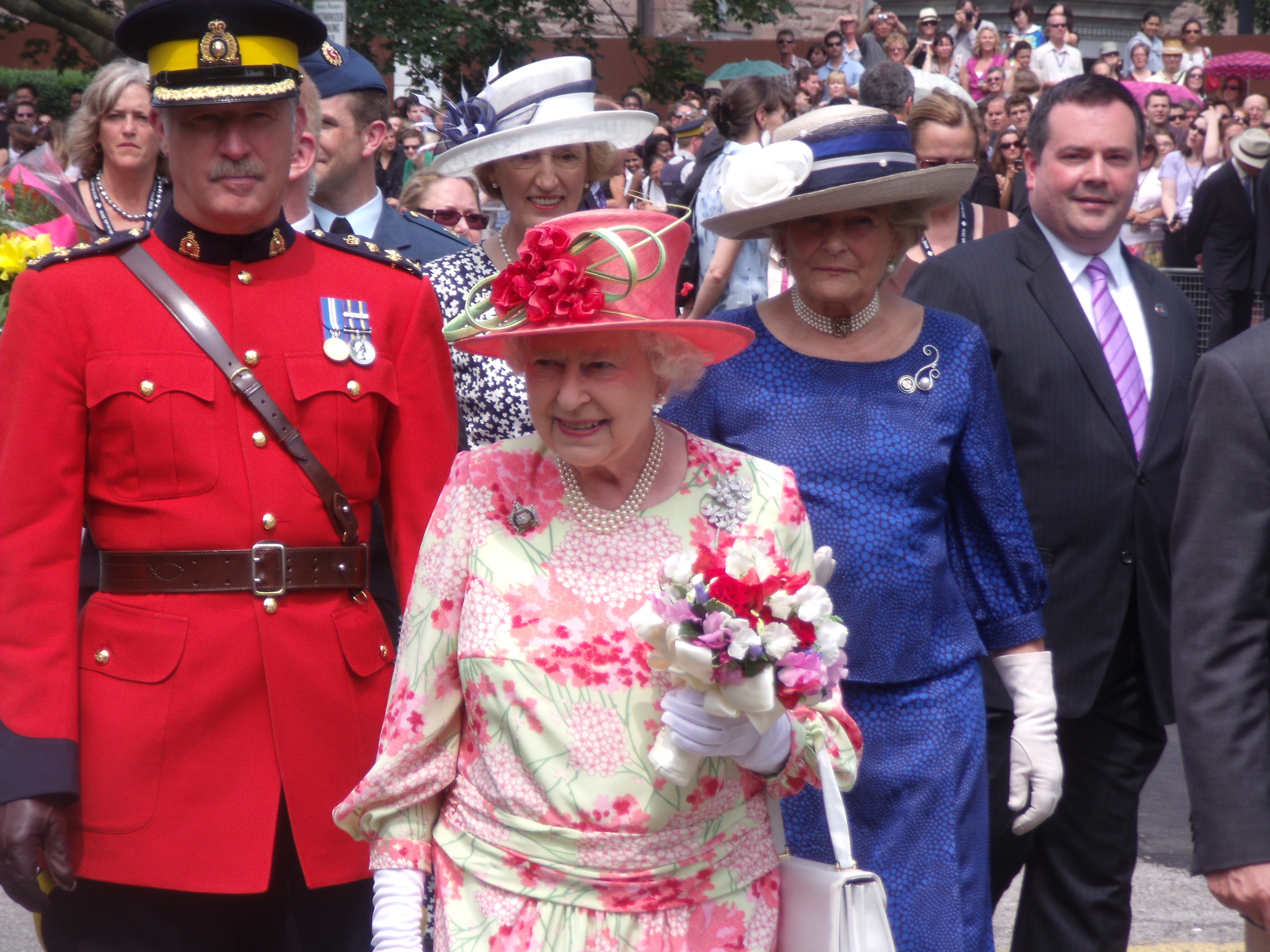
Walking behind Queen Elizabeth II on a visit to Toronto in 2010 are two ladies-in-waiting: a Woman of the Bedchamber (Lady Susan Hussey, left, with white hat) and a Lady of the Bedchamber (Lady Farnham, right, with blue hat).

The ladies of the bedchamber were not in daily attendance, but were called upon for the more important public occasions and events. Two ladies-in-waiting used to accompany the Queen on overseas tours, one of whom was usually a Lady of the Bedchamber. For many years the Queen was always attended by three ladies-in-waiting at the State Opening of Parliament (the Mistress of the Robes, a Lady of the Bedchamber and a Woman of the Bedchamber), but in 1998 the number attending was reduced to two.

Towards the end of her reign, the ladies-in-waiting to Queen Elizabeth II were:

Mistress of the Robes

- The Duchess of Grafton served as Mistress of the Robes to Elizabeth II from 1967 until her death on 3 December 2021 (after which the position remained vacant).

Ladies of the Bedchamber

- The Countess of Airlie was appointed in 1973 and served throughout the rest of Elizabeth II's reign.
- The Lady Farnham served from 1987 until her death in 2021.

Women of the Bedchamber

- The Hon. Dame Mary Morrison was appointed in 1960 and served throughout the rest of Elizabeth II's reign.
- Lady Susan Hussey was also appointed in 1960, and served throughout the rest of Elizabeth II's reign.
- The Lady Elton was appointed in 1987 and served throughout the rest of Elizabeth II's reign.
- Dame Philippa de Pass was appointed as an Extra Woman of the Bedchamber in 1987 and served throughout the rest of Elizabeth II's reign.
- The Hon. Dame Annabel Whitehead was appointed in 2002 and served throughout the rest of Elizabeth II's reign.
- Dame Jennifer Gordon-Lennox was also appointed in 2002, and served throughout the rest of Elizabeth II's reign.

Extra ladies-in-waiting

- Lady Elizabeth Leeming (née Bowes-Lyon), a cousin of Elizabeth II.
- Mrs. Simon Rhodes, daughter-in-law of The Hon. Margaret Rhodes (a cousin of Elizabeth II and former Woman of the Bedchamber to Queen Elizabeth The Queen Mother).

After the death of Elizabeth II and the accession of Charles III, it was announced that the King would be retaining the late Queen's ladies-in-waiting, with their titles changing to "Ladies of the Household". They will help with hosting events at Buckingham Palace.

==== Queen Camilla ====
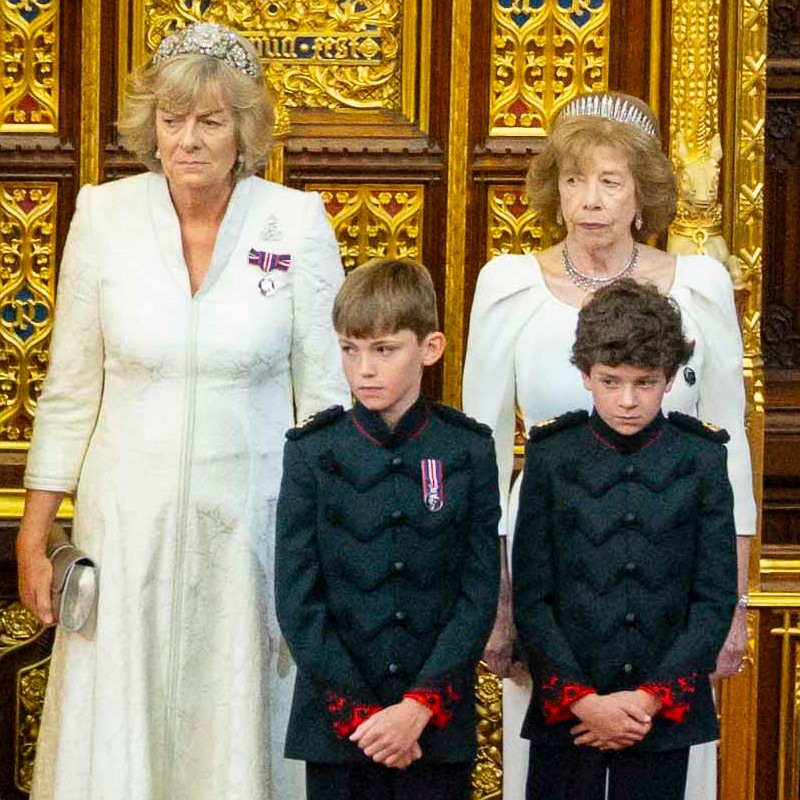
Queen's companions the Marchioness of Lansdowne and Lady Sarah Keswick at the 2024 State Opening of Parliament

In November 2022, it was announced that Queen Camilla would end the tradition of having ladies-in-waiting. Instead, she would be helped by "Queen's companions". Their role would be informal and they would not be involved in tasks such as replying to letters or developing schedules.

As of 30 November 2022 her companions are:

- The Marchioness of Lansdowne
- The Baroness Chisholm of Owlpen
- The Hon. Lady Brooke
- Lady Sarah Keswick
- Annabel Elliot
- Baroness Piers von Westenholz
- Dame Sarah Troughton

==== Historic ====
In the Middle Ages, Margaret of France is noted to have had seven ladies-in-waiting: three married ones, who were called Domina, and four unmarried maids of honour, but no principal lady-in-waiting is mentioned, and until the 15th century, the majority of the officeholders of the queen's household were still male.

As late as in the mid-15th century, Elizabeth Woodville had only five ladies-in-waiting, but in the late 15th century and early 16th century, ladies-in-waiting were given a more dominant place at the English court, in parallel with developments in France and the continental courts. The court life of the Duchy of Burgundy served as an example when Edward IV created the Black Book of the Household in 1478, and the organisation of the English royal household was essentially set from that point onward.

Elizabeth of York had numerous ladies-in-waiting, which was reported by the Spanish ambassador, Rodrigo de Puebla, as something unusual and astonishing: "the Queen has thirty-two ladies, very magnificent and in splendid style". She reportedly had 36 ladies-in-waiting, 18 of them noblewomen; in 1502, a more complete account summarised them as 16 'gentlewomen', seven maids of honour and three 'chamberers-women', who attended to her in the bedchamber. Aside from the women formally employed as ladies-in-waiting, the Queen's female retinue in reality also consisted of the daughters and the ladies-in-waiting of her ladies-in-waiting, who also resided in the Queen's household.

The duties of ladies-in-waiting at the Tudor court were to act as companions for the queen, both in public and in private. They had to accompany her wherever she went, to entertain her with music, dance or singing and to dress, bathe and help her use the toilet, since a royal person, by the standards of the day, was not supposed to do anything for herself, but was always to be waited upon in all daily tasks as a sign of their status.

Ladies-in-waiting were appointed because of their social status as members of the nobility, on the recommendation of court officials, or other prominent citizens, and because they were expected to be supporters of the royal family due to their own family relationships. When the queen was not a foreigner, her own relations were often appointed as they were presumed to be trustworthy and loyal. Margaret Lee was a lady of the privy chamber to Anne Boleyn, just as Elizabeth Seymour was to Jane Seymour.

The organisation of the queen's ladies-in-waiting was set in the period of the Tudor court. The ladies-in-waiting were headed by the mistress of the robes, followed in rank by the first lady of the bedchamber, who supervised the group of ladies of the bedchamber (typically wives or widows of peers above the rank of earl), in turn followed by the group of women of the bedchamber (usually the daughters of peers) and finally the group of maids of honour, whose service entitled them to the style of "The Honourable" for life.

The system had formally remained roughly the same since the Tudor period. However, in practice, many offices have since then been left vacant. For example, in recent times, maids of honour have only been appointed for coronations.

== Notable examples ==
This is a list of particularly well known and famous ladies-in-waiting of each nation listed. More can be found in their respective category.

=== Austria ===
- Countess Sophie Chotek von Chotkow und Wognin, later Duchess of Hohenberg (1868–1914)

=== Canada ===
- Margaret Southern (b. 1931)

=== Denmark ===
- Louise Scheel von Plessen (1725–1799)

=== England and Scotland ===
- Catherine Douglas (fl. 1497)
- Elizabeth Woodville (possibly; 1437–1492)
- Lady Mary Boleyn (с. 1499/1500–1543)
- Four of Henry VIII's queens consort:
  - Lady Anne Boleyn (c. 1501/07–1536)
  - Jane Seymour (c. 1508–1537)
  - Catherine Howard (с. 1523–1542)
  - Catherine Parr (1512–1548)
- Jane Boleyn, Viscountess Rochford (c. 1505–1542)
- Katherine Ashley (c. 1502–1565)
- Jane Dormer, later Duchess of Feria (1538–1612)
- Mary Fleming (1542–1581); one of the Four Marys
- Lettice Knollys (1543–1634)
- Sarah Churchill, Duchess of Marlborough (1660–1744)
- Ivy Gordon-Lennox, later Duchess of Portland (1887–1982)
- Ruth Roche, Baroness Fermoy (1908–1993)
- Lady Pamela Mountbatten (1929-2026)
- Jane Loftus, Marchioness of Ely (1821–1890)
- Lady Sarah McCorquodale (b. 1955)

=== Egypt ===
- Nahed Rashad (1917–1985); lady-in-waiting for Princess Fawzia after her divorce from the Shah of Iran.
- Zeinab Zulficar (1895–1990); first lady-in-waiting of Queen Nazli.

=== France ===
- Françoise de Brézé, Countess of Maulévrier (1518–1577); Regent of Sedan from 1553 to 1559
- Jacqueline de Longwy, Countess of Bar-sur-Sein (before 1520–1561)
- Henriette of Cleves, 4th Duchess of Nevers (1542–1601); one of France's chief creditors until her death
- Marie Thérèse Louise of Savoy, Princess of Lamballe (1749–1792)
- Yolande de Polastron (1749–1793)
- Louise-Élisabeth de Croÿ, Marchioness of Tourzel (1749–1832)

=== Germany ===
- Marie Luise von Degenfeld (1634–1677); at the court of The Palatinate in Heidelberg
- Maria Charlotte von Schafftenberg (1699–1780); at the court of the Electorate of Saxony in Dresden
- Sophie Caroline von Camas (1686–1766); at the court of the Prussia in Berlin
- Baroness Maria Caroline Charlotte von Ingenheim (1704–1749); at the court of Bavaria in Munich
- Eleonore von Schlieben (1720–1755); at the court of Prussia
- Sophie Marie von Voß (1729–1814); at the court of Prussia
- Charlotte von Stein (1742–1827); at the court of Saxe-Weimar
- Luise von Göchhausen (1752–1807); at the court of Saxe-Weimar
- Karoline Friederike von Berg (1760–1826); at the court of Prussia
- Gabriele von Bülow (1802–1887); chief lady-in-waiting at the court of Prussia
- Rosalie von Rauch, later Countess of Hohenau (1820–1879); at the court of Prussia

=== Hungary ===
- Helene Kottanner (1400–1470); lady-in-waiting for Elisabeth of Luxembourg, she organized the abduction of the Holy Crown and nursed Elisabeth of Habsburg, who later become a Polish queen
- Countess Irma Sztáray de Sztára et Nagymihály (1863–1940); at the court of Empress Elisabeth "Sisi" of Austria
- Countess Marie Festetics von Tolna (1839–1923); lady-in-waiting for Empress Elisabeth of Austria and Honorary Lady of the Order of Theresa
- Ida Krisztina Veronika Ferenczy of Vecseszék (1839–1928); close friend and confidant of Empress Elisabeth of Austria

=== Japan ===
- Lady Ise (875–938); poet, lover of Prince Atsuyoshi and later concubine of Emperor Uda
- Takashina no Takako (d. 996); served at the court of Empress Junshi, later the legal wife of Fujiwara no Michitaka and regent of Emperor Ichijō
- Uma no Naishi (949–1011); poet, she served under Empress Kishi (wife of Emperor Murakami), Fujiwara no Senshi (the imperial consort of Emperor En'yū and mother of Emperor Ichijō) and Empress Teishi (wife of Emperor Ichijō), and later became a follower of Shōnagon
- Akazome Emon (с. 956–1041 or later); poet and writer of "Tale of Flowering Fortunes", she served at the court of Empress Shoshi
- Murasaki Shikibu (c. 978 – c. 1016/1031); poet and the writer of the first known novel, "The Tale of Genji", she also wrote a diary about court life after serving at the court of Empress Shoshi
- Sei Shōnagon (c. 966–1017/1025); writer of the Pillow Book, she served at the court of Empress Teishi
- Ise no Taifu (989–1060); poet, she served Empress Shoshi along with Murasaki Shikibu, Akazome Emon and Izumi Shikibu, and later became the nurse of Emperor Shirakawa
- Daini no Sanmi (999–1082); daughter of Murasaki Shikibu she served at the court of Grand Empress Dowager Shoshi and was the nurse of Emperor Go-Reizei and the imperial princesses
- Lady Sarashina (1008–after 1059); writer of Sarashina Nikki, she served Imperial Princess Yushi, the third daughter of Emperor Go-Suzaku

=== Korea ===
- Kim Gae-si (d. 1623)
- Royal Consort Gwi-in of the Okcheon Jo clan (d. 1652)
- Jang Ok-jeong, Royal Noble Consort Hui of the Indong Jang clan (1659–1701)
- Royal Noble Consort Suk of the Haeju Choe clan (1670–1718)
- Royal Noble Consort Yeong of the Jeonui Yi clan (1696–1764)
- Royal Noble Consort Ui of the Changnyeong Seong clan (1753–1786)
- Imperial Consort Boknyeong Gwi-in of the Cheongju Yang clan (1882–1929)

=== China ===
- Lu Lingxuan (d. 577); served as the wet nurse of Emperor Gao Wei
- Sumalagu (1615–1705); palace attendant during the Qing dynasty and close confidant of Empress Dowager Xiaozhuang
- Wei Tuan'er (d. 693); favourite lady-in-waiting of Wu Zetian
- Princess Der Ling (1885–1944); she was given the title of "commandery princess" while serving as the first lady-in-waiting for Empress Dowager Cixi
- Nellie Yu Roung Ling (1889–1973); she was given the title of "commandery princess" while serving as a lady-in-waiting for Empress Dowager Cixi

=== Ottoman Empire ===
- Gülfem Hatun (d. 1562); supposed concubine of Sultan Suleiman I the Magnificent
- Canfeda Hatun (d. 1600); mistress housekeeper
- Hubbi Hatun (d. 1590); poet
- Raziye Hatun (1525–1597); mistress of financial affairs
- Şahinde Hanım (née Princess Kezban Marshania; c. 1895–1924); lady-in-waiting to her aunt, Nazikeda Kadın
- Şekerpare Hatun; mistress housekeeper

=== Poland ===
- Marie Casimire Louise de La Grange d'Arquien, later Queen of Poland (1641–1716)
- Klara Izabella Pacowa (1631–1685)
- Elżbieta Helena Sieniawska (1669–1729)

=== Russia ===
- Sophia Stepanovna Razumovskaya (1746–1803); a mistress of Paul I of Russia
- Countess Julia von Hauke, later Princess of Battenberg (1825–1895)
- Anna Alexandrovna Vyrubova (1884–1964)

=== Sweden ===
- Elizabeth Ribbing (1596–1662), and later her morganatic daughter, Elizabeth Carlsdotter Gyllenhielm (1622–1682)
- Ulrika Strömfelt (1724–1780)
- Augusta von Fersen (1754–1846)
- Magdalena Rudenschöld (1766–1823)

=== Thailand ===
- Princess Vibhavadi Rangsit (1920–1977)

== See also ==
- Chaperone (social)
- Handmaiden
- Lady's companion
- Lady's maid
- Manservant
- Odalisque
