= Nazikeda Kadın (wife of Mehmed VI) =

Wife of Ottoman Sultan Mehmed VI (1866–1941)

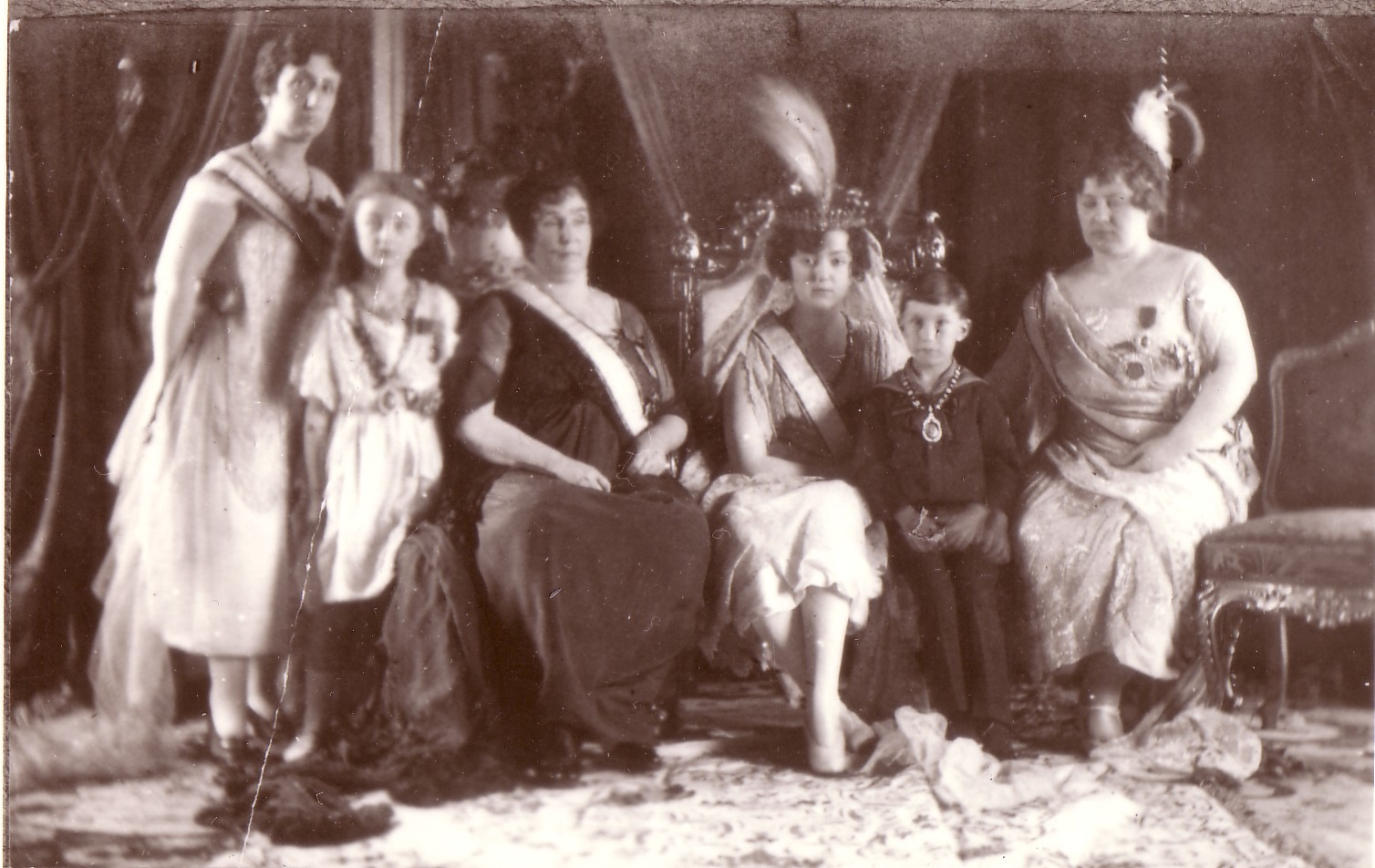
- Nazikeda (third from left) at her daughter Sabiha's (third from right) wedding, 1920
- Born: Emine Marshania; 9 October 1866; Sukhum, Caucasus Viceroyalty, Russian Empire
- Died: 4 April 1941 (aged 74); Maadi, Cairo, Kingdom of Egypt
- Burial: Abbas Hilmi Pasha Mausoleum, Abbasiye Cemetery
- Spouse: Mehmed VI (m. 1885; died 1926)
- Issue: Münire Fenire Sultan; Fatma Ulviye Sultan; Rukiye Sabiha Sultan
Names
- Turkish: Emine Nazikeda Kadın; Ottoman Turkish: نازك ادا قادین
- House: Marshania (by birth); Ottoman (by marriage)
- Father: Hasan Ali Marshania
- Mother: Fatma Horecan Aredba
- Religion: Sunni Islam

Nazikeda Kadın (Turkish pronunciation: [nazik̟ʰeda kʰadɯn], Ottoman Turkish: نازك ادا قادین; meaning 'one of delicate manners'; born Princess Emine Marshania; 9 October 1866 – 4 April 1941), also nicknamed the Last Empress, was the first wife and chief consort of the last sultan, Mehmed VI of the Ottoman Empire.

Nazikeda was born Emine Marshania in Sukhumi to a family of Abkhazian principality. She was the daughter of Prince Hasan Bey Marshania and Fatma Horecan Hanım Aredba. She came to Istanbul in 1876, and married Prince Mehmed Vahdeddin later known as Mehmed VI, in 1885. She was his only wife for twenty years. She was the mother of three daughters, Münire Fenire Sultan, Fatma Ulviye Sultan, and Rukiye Sabiha Sultan.

After Mehmed acceded to the throne in 1918, she was named 'Senior Kadın'. Mehmed was deposed in 1922 and exiled in 1924. Nazikeda followed him and remained with him until he died in 1926. She spent her last years with her two daughters, Ulviye and Sabiha, and died at Cairo in 1941.

== Early life ==
Nazikeda Kadın was born on 9 October 1866 in Sukhum. Born as Emine Marshania, she was a member of Abkhazian princely family Marshania. Her father was Prince Hassan Bey Marshan (died 1877), the ruler of Tzebelda. Her mother was Princess Fatma Horecan Hanım Aredba, an Abkhazian. She had two elder brothers Prince Abdülkadir Bey, and Prince Mehmed Bey, and two younger sisters, Princess Naciye Hanım, and Princess Daryal Hanım (1870–1904).

In 1876, she was brought to Istanbul as a young child, where her father entrusted her to the imperial harem together with her sister Daryal, and wetnurse Babuce Hanım (died 1910). She was then sent to Cemile Sultan's palace in Kandilli with her sisters and her cousins Amine, Rumeysa, Pakize, Fatma, and Kamile, where her name according to the custom of the Ottoman court was changed to Nazikeda. She was educated very well and learned to play the piano; she also loved riding, and Cemile Sultan allowed her to do it in the park of her palace.

Cemile Sultan's youngest daughter, Fatma Hanımsultan, had tuberculosis, and Nazikeda became her closest companion in 1880. Cemile raised her as if she were her own daughter. Her nanny remained with her even as she grew up, although she had been told she could return to Caucasia if she wished. She, however, stayed with Nazikeda until her death. Nazikeda was beautiful, tall, and curvy and had honey-coloured eyes, long auburn hair, pale skin, and slender waist.

== Marriage ==
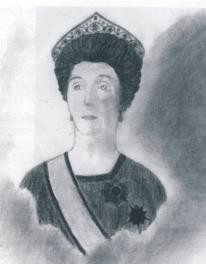
Portrait of Nazikeda

One day in 1884, when Mehmed was in his twenties, he visited his older sister, Cemile Sultan, at her palace at Kandilli. Here, he saw Nazikeda, then seventeen years old, and fell in love with her. He asked his sister to give him Nazikeda in marriage, but Cemile flatly refused. She did not want her sick daughter to be deprived of a companion, and at the same time, her brother would eventually take a second wife after Nazikeda, whom she considered as her own daughter.

However, one year after the prince's pleading, who otherwise threatened never to marry Cemile, acceded to her brother's demand, but on one condition: he would not take a second wife. He took the oath requested by his sister, and the marriage took place on 8 June 1885 in one of the palaces of Örtakoy. The marriage was consummated on 18 June. Mehmed was twenty-four while Nazikeda was nineteen. After the marriage, the couple lived in one of the palaces of Feriye, where they spent several years in a three-storey wooden mansion. This mansion was destroyed in a fire, and the couple later moved to the mansion in Çengelköy. All loved and respected her, even King Farouk in exile. Her fashion style was appreciated even by Abdülhamid II himself, who once congratulated her for dressing her daughters so well.

Around the same time, her sister Daryal renamed Iryale was married to Şehzade Mehmed Selim, son of Sultan Abdul Hamid II. Her cousin Amine renamed also Nazikeda was married to Şehzade Yusuf Izzeddin, son of Sultan Abdulaziz.

The couple's first daughter, Munire Fenire Sultan, was born in 1888 and lived only a few weeks. She was followed by Fatma Ulviye Sultan, born on 11 September 1892, and two years later, on 19 March 1894, by Rukiye Sabiha Sultan. After this third birth, the doctors told Nazikeda that she would not be able to bear other children.

On 30 May 1918, Nazikeda met with the Empress Zita of Bourbon-Parma in the harem of Yıldız Palace, when the latter visited Istanbul with her husband Emperor Charles I of Austria.

In the following years, Mehmed married other women to have a male heir, but all of his marriages were made with the consent of Nazikeda. Even though Mehmed's accession to the throne was unlikely, Nazikeda knew well that as a prince, he had to have a male heir and, therefore, accepted his wish to remarry each time. By doing so, Mehmed broke his vow to his sister Cemile. Nonetheless, after he acceded to the throne in 1918, he gave Nazikeda the title of "Senior Kadın", and his respect towards her never failed. Since both Mehmed VI's natural and adoptive mothers had died (Gülistu Kadın and Şayeste Hanim), Nazikeda became the most prominent female member of the dynasty and became known in Europe as the last Ottoman empress (usually in Europe this title was reserved for the sultan's mother, while his first consort was considered Queen, and subsequent consorts princesses or ladies). During the reign of her husband, she patronised mosques and hospitals, helped Circassians in economic difficulties, and invited Russian aristocrats fleeing because of the Russian revolution to Yıldız Palace.

By 1916, Mehmed and Nazikeda's daughters had grown and reached the age of marriage. The elder daughter, Ulviye, was the first to marry. The groom was Ismail Hakki Bey, the son of last grand vizier of the Ottoman Empire, Ahmed Tevfik Pasha. The wedding occurred in a waterfront palace at Kuruçeşme on 10 August 1916, when Mehmed was a Crown Prince. The couple had a daughter, Hümeyra Hanımsultan, born on 4 June 1917. Ulviye divorced Ismail and married Ali Haydar Bey, a member of the Germiyanoğlu family.

In 1920, she helped her daughter, Sabiha Sultan, obtain from her father permission to marry her cousin Şehzade Ömer Faruk; permission was initially denied because there was bad blood between Mehmed's family branch and that of Abdülmejid, Faruk's father, due to the deposition and controversial death of Sultan Abdülaziz, father of Abdülmecid. Nazikeda allied herself with Şehsuvar Hanim, Faruk's mother, and managed to obtain permission for the wedding, which was held on 29 April. The marriage took place on 29 April 1920 at the Topkapi Palace. The couple had three daughters, Neslişah Sultan, Hanzade Sultan, and Necla Sultan.

== Exile and widowhood ==
In 1922, Mehmed was deposed and exiled. She, together with other members of his family, was kept under house arrest at the Feriye Palace by order of the new parliament, where she lived through difficult times, often starving, she never complained, though, and always took care of the other women, until 10 March 1924, when they were sent into exile. Nazikeda, along with Mehmed, moved to Sanremo. During their stay, Mehmed's daily routine was to visit Nazikeda's room, which was on the same floor as his apartment, to drink his morning coffee with her.

Following Mehmed's death in 1926, she moved to Monte Carlo with her elder daughter Ulviye Sultan, her husband Ali Haydar Bey, and her daughter Hümeyra Hanımsultan. She also used to come for a stay at Nice with her younger daughter, Sabiha Sultan, and her husband, Prince Ömer Faruk. A large room used to be assigned to her, which she shared with Şehzade Mehmed Ertuğrul, her stepson, whenever he came back from Grasse.

Nazikeda later moved to Alexandria with Ulviye, and after her grave illness there, Sabiha joined them in 1938. In 1940, she attended the wedding of her granddaughter, Neslişah Sultan and Prince Mohamed Abdel Moneim, son of Egypt's last khedive Abbas Hilmi II. She wore a purple dress with hotoz. She would never miss a prayer. As she could not kneel down in her last years, she prayed on her chair.

== Death ==
Nazikeda died at Maadi, Cairo, on 4 April 1941 at the age of seventy-four and was buried in the mausoleum of Abbas Hilmi Pasha in the Abbasiye Cemetery.

== Issue ==
Name	Birth	Death	Notes
Münire Fenire Sultan	1888	1888, two weeks later	born and died in infancy in the Feriye Palace. She is sometimes regarded as twins rather than a single princess.
Fatma Ulviye Sultan	11 September 1892	1 January 1967	married twice, and had issue, a daughter
Rukiye Sabiha Sultan	19 March 1894	26 August 1971	married once, and issue, three daughters

== In literature ==
- Nazikeda is a minor character in T. Byram Karasu's historical novel Of God and Madness: A Historical Novel (2007).

== See also ==
- Kadın (title)
- Ottoman Imperial Harem
- List of consorts of the Ottoman sultans
- Leyla Achba
- Rumeysa Aredba
- Şahinde Hanım

== Sources ==
- Açba, Leyla (2004). Bir Çerkes prensesinin harem hatıraları. L & M. ISBN 978-9-756-49131-7.
- Aredba, Rumeysa; Açba, Edadil (2009). Sultan Vahdeddinin San Remo Günleri. Timaş Yayınları. ISBN 978-9-752-63955-3.
- Bardakçı, Murat (2017). Neslishah: The Last Ottoman Princess. Oxford University Press. ISBN 978-9-774-16837-6.
- Uluçay, M. Çağatay (2011). Padişahların kadınları ve kızları. Ötüken. ISBN 978-9-754-37840-5.
