= Ahmet Tevfik Pasha =

Grand Vizier of the Ottoman Empire (1909, 1918–1919, 1920–1922)

Ahmet Tevfik Okday Pasha
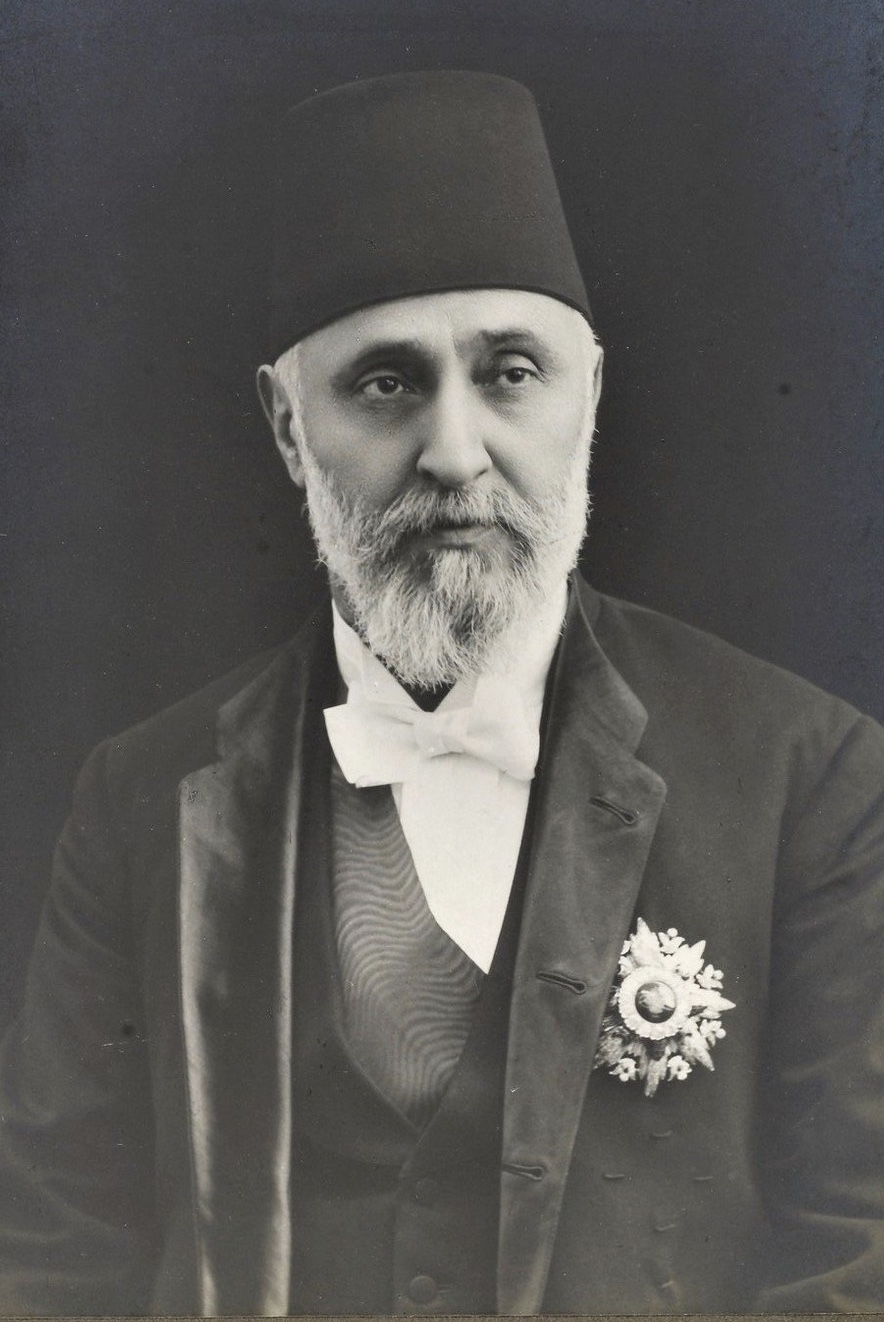
- Ahmet Tevfik, c. 1906

Grand Vizier of the Ottoman Empire
- In office 21 October 1920 – 4 November 1922
- Monarch: Mehmed VI
- Preceded by: Damat Ferid Pasha
- Succeeded by: Office abolished İsmet İnönü, as Prime Minister of Turkey
- In office 11 November 1918 – 3 March 1919
- Monarch: Mehmed VI
- Preceded by: Ahmed Izzet Pasha
- Succeeded by: Damat Ferid Pasha
- In office 13 April 1909 – 5 May 1909
- Monarchs: Abdul Hamid II; Mehmed V
- Preceded by: Hüseyin Hilmi Pasha
- Succeeded by: Hüseyin Hilmi Pasha

Foreign Minister of the Ottoman Empire
- In office 1899–1909
- Monarch: Abdul Hamid II
- Prime Minister: Halil Rifat Pasha; Mehmed Said Pasha; Mehmed Ferid Pasha; Kâmil Pasha; Hüseyin Hilmi Pasha
- Preceded by: Said Halim Pasha
- Succeeded by: Mehmed Rifat Pasha

Personal details
- Born: 11 February 1845 Constantinople, Ottoman Empire
- Died: 8 October 1936 (aged 91) Istanbul, Turkey
- Spouse: Elisabeth Tschumi (1859-1949)
- Children: 5, including İsmail Hakkı Okday

Ahmet Tevfik Pasha (Ottoman Turkish: احمد توفیق پاشا; 11 February 1845 – 8 October 1936), later Ahmet Tevfik Okday after the Turkish Surname Law of 1934, was an Ottoman diplomat and statesman of Crimean Tatar origin. He was the last grand vizier of the Ottoman Empire.

Tevfik Pasha had the misfortune of all three of his terms as Grand Vizier coinciding with disastrous moments in late Ottoman history; his first term with the deposition of Abdul Hamid II, the second term with the occupation of Istanbul after World War I, and the third term with the abolition of the Sultanate. In addition to serving as Grand Vizier, Ahmet Tevfik was also a diplomat, a member of the Ottoman Senate, and long time Minister of Foreign Affairs.

== Early life ==
Ahmet Tevfik was born on 11 February 1845 in Üsküdar, Istanbul. His father, Ferik Ismail Hakkı Pasha, was a Crimean Tatar descended from the Giray dynasty. He lost his mother, Gülşinas Banu Hanım, shortly after his birth. His aunt took care of his education, allowing him to speak Persian, Arabic and French fluently.

Ahmet Tevfik entered military service but left after becoming a junior officer, entering government bureaucracy training. He left the military at the age of 22 -he was a participant of the 1877-1878 Russo-Turkish War- and entered the Sublime Porte's Translation Office. From 1872, he held various foreign ministry posts. After serving as an ambassador in Rome, Vienna, St. Petersburg, and Athens, in 1885 he served as the Ottoman chargé d'affaires and ambassador to Germany in Berlin for ten years.

== Foreign ministry ==
In 1895, Tevfik was appointed to the Foreign Ministry during the height of the Armenian crisis. He represented the Ottoman Empire in the Treaty of Constantinople, which ended the 1897 Greco-Turkish War. Sultan Abdul Hamid II, as a reward for his work, gifted him a mansion, known first as the Italian Ministry Mansion, then the Foreign Ministry Mansion, finally the Tevfik Pasha Mansion. It was a neoclassical eclectic structure made largely of wood, and it became the headquarters of the Foreign Ministry.

He retained his ministry following the Young Turk Revolution, and in December 1908 he was appointed to the Senate of the Ottoman Empire (Turkish: Ayan Meclisi), the upper house of the also-revived parliament, the General Assembly (Turkish: Meclis-i Umûmî). He resigned from the Foreign Ministry with the fall of the Kâmil Pasha cabinet in early 1909, and was appointed ambassador to the Court of St. James's on 6 April 1909, though he didn't arrive to his post due to the 31 March incident of 13 April.

== First term as Grand Vizier (1909) ==
Ahmet Tevfik Pasha's first period of office as grand vizier was one of the direct outcomes of the failed counterrevolutionary 31 March Incident (which actually occurred on 13 April) in 1909. When the absolutists declared the countercoup, they demanded and received the resignation of the previous Grand Vizier Hüseyin Hilmi Pasha. Although their preferred replacement was not Ahmet Tevfik Pasha, his appointment at least fulfilled their demands for the removal of Hüseyin Hilmi Pasha. Ahmet Tevfik Pasha, who had only reluctantly taken up the post at the urging of Sultan Abdul Hamid II, formed a government made up of mostly non-partisan and neutral members and took precautions to limit the chaos that had begun in Istanbul and Adana. After the Army of Action entered Istanbul and restored the constitutional government, and Abdul Hamid was deposed, Ahmet Tevfik Pasha resigned and Hüseyin Hilmi Pasha returned as grand vizier.

== Ambassador to London ==
Afterwards he formally began his London ambassadorship, and was ambassador during the July Crisis. He returned to Istanbul after war was declared on Britain. He visited Germany again in September 1918 as a member of a delegation announcing the accession of Mehmed VI (Sultan since July 4, 1918).

== Second term as Grand Vizier (1918–1919) ==
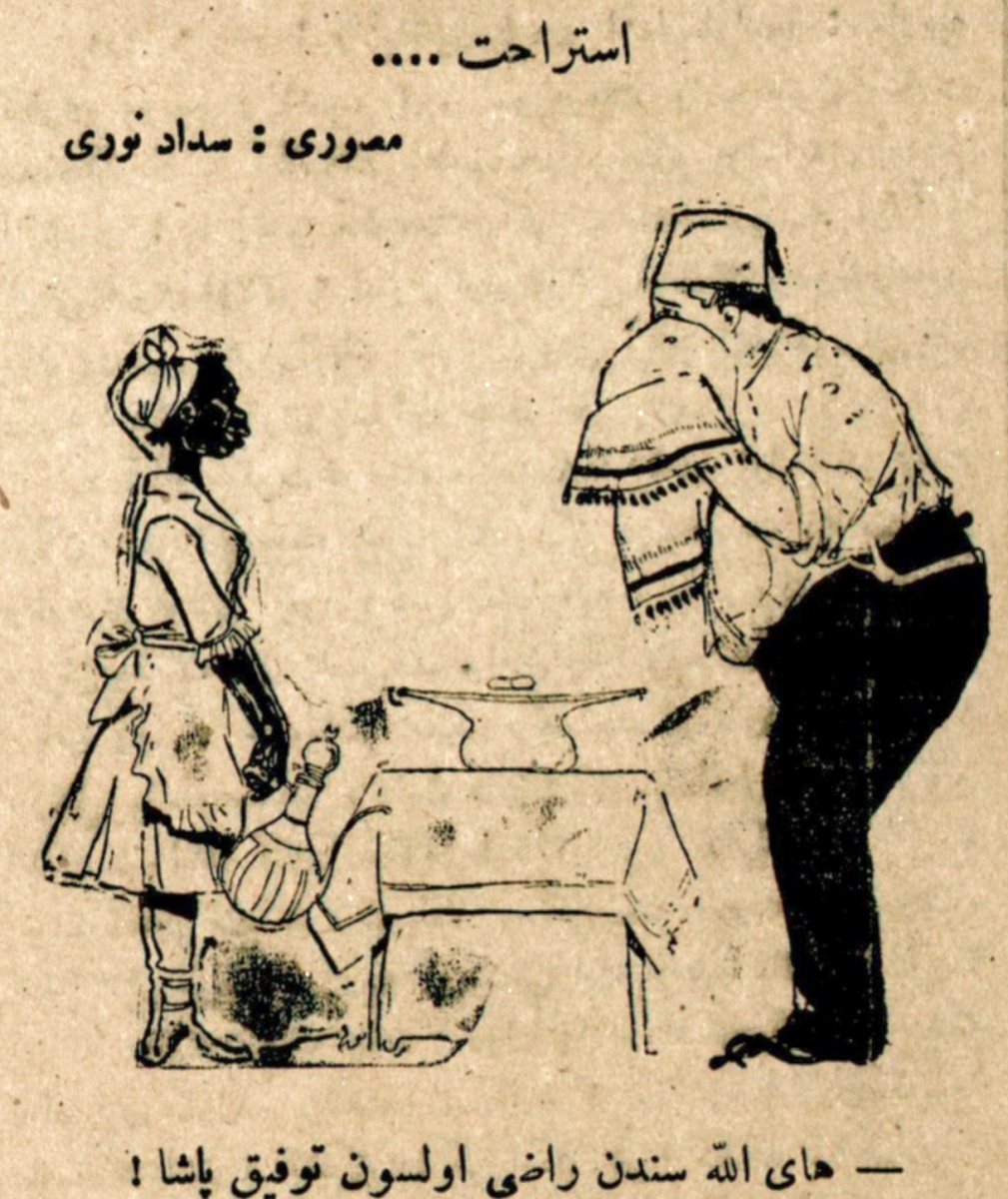
Cartoon titled "Rest" [İstirhat] by Sedat Nuri. Talât Pasha says "God bless you, Tevfik Pasha!", depicted as a black servant girl

After World War I and the resignation of Ahmed Izzet Pasha, Ahmet Tevfik Pasha was again appointed grand vizier on 11 November 1918. Two days after his term began, the Allies began their occupation of Constantinople. The Allies pressured Sultan Mehmed VI to dissolve the parliament on 21 December 1918, and for a few weeks, Ahmet Tevfik Pasha's government was dissolved as well. He formed a new government on 12 January 1919, but after the Allies forced him to dissolve it once more, he resigned as grand vizier on 3 March 1919. A political scandal that contributed to the fall of the government was the escape of Mehmed Reshid from prison and his subsequent suicide, who was high ranking CUP member who was known as the "butcher of Diyarbakır" during World War I. Damat Ferid Pasha accused Tevfik of being soft on the Unionists, which prompted Tevfik Pasha to arrest key Unionists after the event. Ferid Pasha succeeded Tevfik on the 4 March 1919.

=== Paris Peace Conference ===
After his second term as grand vizier, Ahmet Tevfik Pasha became the President of the Ottoman Senate (which had not yet been dissolved, unlike the lower house). He then attended the two Ottoman delegations to the Paris Peace Conference to negotiate peace terms in 1919, which he was head of, and in 1920 though he understood the presented terms as unacceptable. The 1920 delegation which was headed by the Grand Vizier Damat Ferid Pasha accepted the terms and signed the Treaty of Sèvres.

== Third term as Grand Vizier (1920–1922) ==
On 21 October 1920, he was once more appointed grand vizier, replacing Damat Ferit Pasha. Meanwhile, the Turkish National Movement had established another government in Ankara, proclaiming itself to be the sole government of Turkey and rejecting the so-called "Istanbul government". Ahmet Tevfik Pasha offered the nationalist Ankara government to join the Istanbul government to form a united front at the Conference of London in 1921. However, the leader in Ankara, Mustafa Kemal Pasha, refused the offer because of his belief that Ankara was the sole legitimate government of Turkey, and the two governments sent separate delegations to the conference, with Ahmet Tevfik Pasha himself leading the Istanbul delegation and Bekir Sami Kunduh leading the Ankara delegation. However, once he arrived in London, Ahmet Tevfik Pasha, in a surprising move, proclaimed that the Ankara government indeed was the sole rightful government of Turkey and allowed Bekir Sami to be the only representative at the conference.

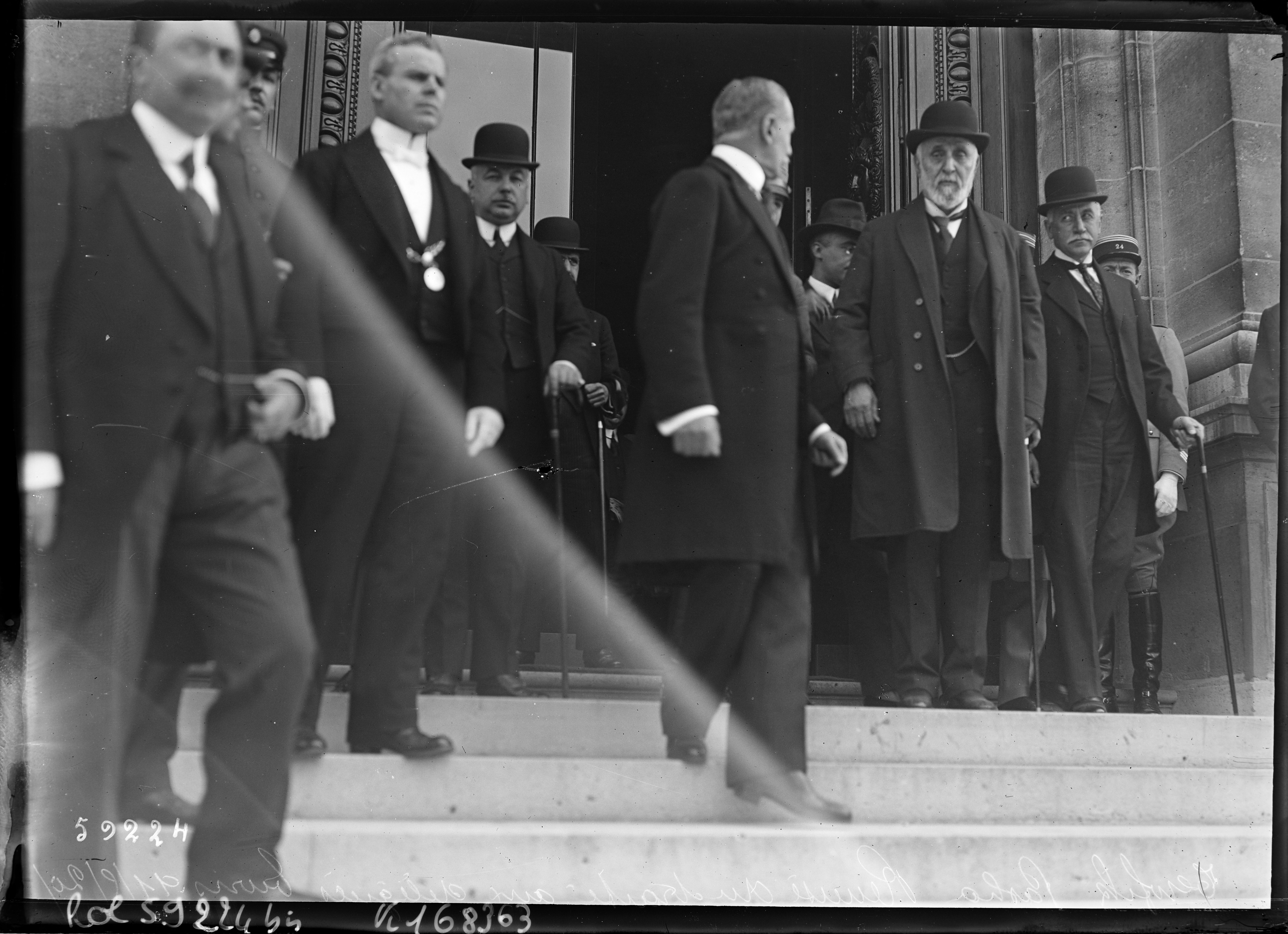
11 May 1920, presentation of peace terms to the Turkish delegation

After the abolition of the Ottoman Sultanate on 1 November 1922, Ahmet Tevfik Pasha met with his government. With the Sultan Mehmed VI deposed and unable to find a reason to hold their offices any longer, the government began to resign one by one, and Ahmet Tevfik Pasha resigned on 4 November 1922. In an abnormal move he announced his resignation to the press instead of meeting with the Sultan and he kept the imperial seal instead of returning it. He never met Mehmed VI again, possibly out of shame after serving the state for almost three quarters of a century.

== Later life and death ==
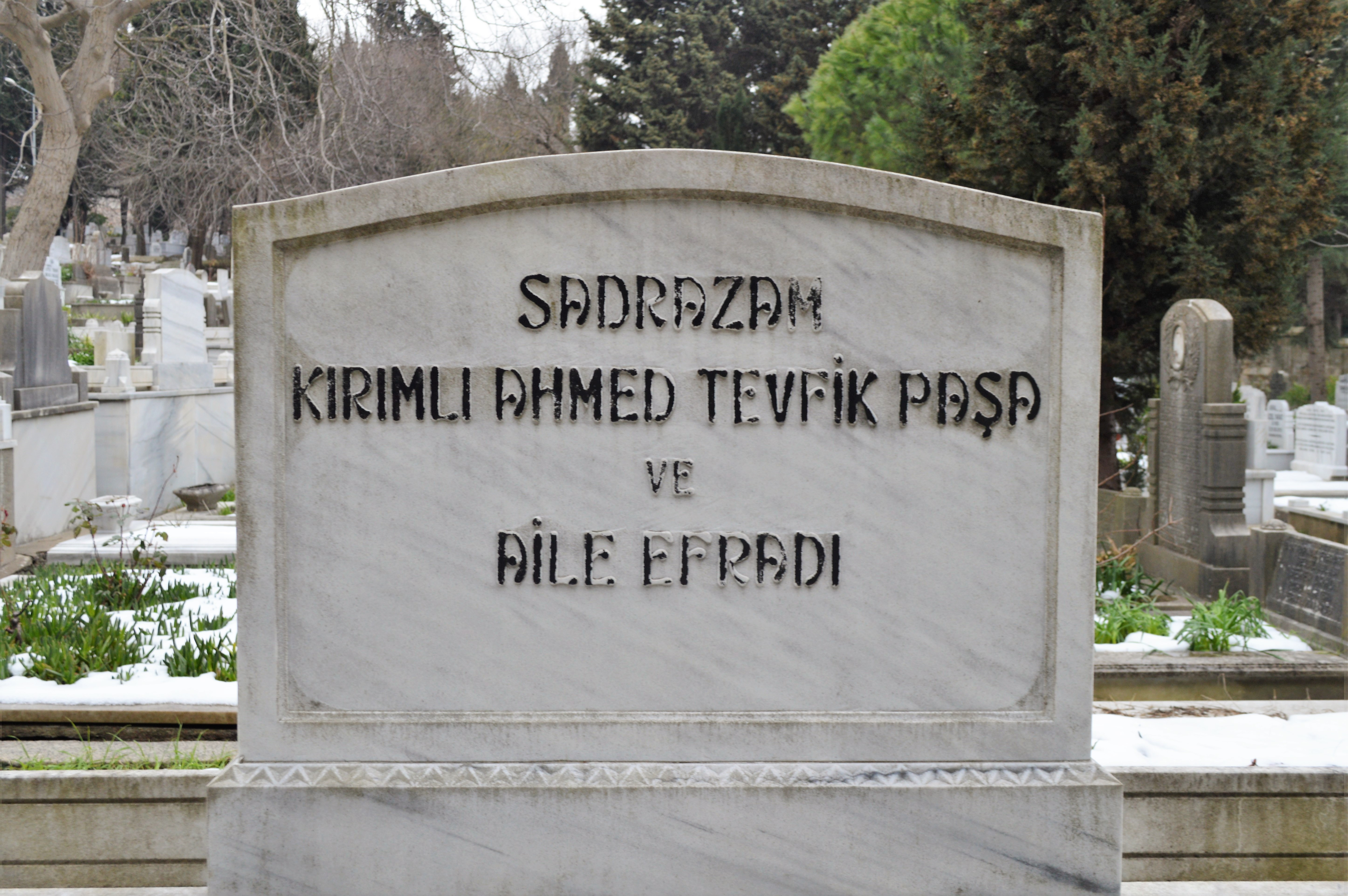
Gravestone of Ahmet Tevfik Pasha, Edirnekapı Martyr's Cemetery, Istanbul

Tevfik Pasha withdrew from politics after the proclamation of the Republic of Turkey. He turned his mansion in Ayaspaşa into a hotel in the 1930s, in accordance with his wife's wishes. The mansion became famous under the name "Park Otel" under the management of restaurateur Aram Hıdır. When his eyesight began to fail, Tevfik settled in the hotel. After the 1934 Surname Law, he adopted the last name "Okday". He died on 8 October 1936 in Istanbul at the age of 93, and is interred at the Edirnekapı Martyr's Cemetery.

His biography, written by his grandson Şefik Okday, was published in 1986 and is titled My Grandfather, the Last Grand Vizier, Ahmet Tevfik Pasha (Turkish: Büyükbabam Son Sadrazam Ahmet Tevfik Paşa).

== Family ==
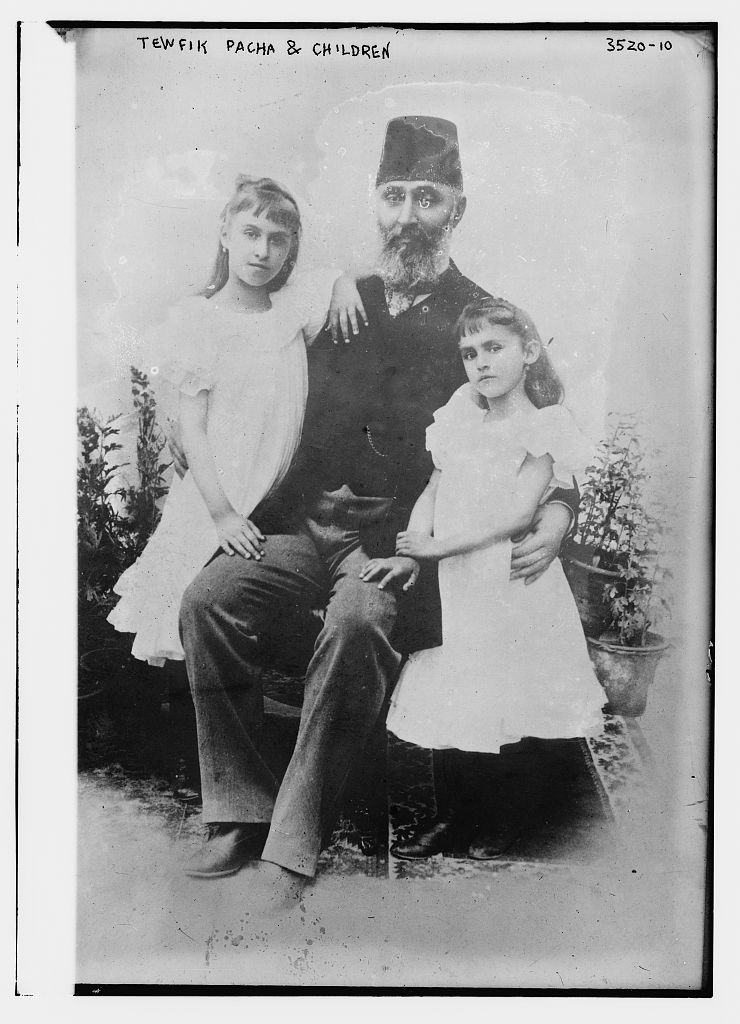
Tevfik Pasha and his daughters

While serving as chargé d'affaires in Athens, he met and married Elisabeth Tschumi, a Swiss woman working as a governess to the children of another diplomat, daughter of Jacob Tschumi. She changed her name to Afife following their wedding, but she chose to stay Protestant. However, a few days before Elisabeth's death in 1949, she decided to be buried next to her husband as a Muslim. They had five children together.

According to his grandson Şefik Okday, Tevfik Oktay's first two children, İsmail Hakkı Pasha and Ali Nuri Bey (father of Şefik), were secretly baptized. A daughter, Zehra Hanım, married Mazlum Bey, the son of Minister of Internal Affairs Memduh Pasha. Naile and Gülşinas died young. Ali Nuri Bey married Edibe (Ayaşlı) Hanım, the granddaughter of Sadullah Pasha, whom he met during Tevfik Pasha's tenure as Ambassador to Berlin. Their wedding was the first to be gender integrated in the Ottoman Empire.

İsmail Hakkı Pasha first married Ulviye Sultan, daughter of the Sultan Mehmed VI, making him a Damat, or imperial in-law. This made İsmail Hakkı Pasha a son of a grand vizier and son-in-law of the Sultan. He was one of the first officers to answer calls of resistance during the Turkish War of Independence. An apocryphal story has the officer of the imperial family meeting Mustafa Kemal Atatürk, whereupon the renegade asked him, "What news did you bring from your father and the sultan?", İsmail Hakkı Pasha answered "[that] I came to fight." Tevfik Pasha, informed of his son's escapade by the angered sultan replied, "he went to fulfill his duty". Mehmed VI enacted a divorce on the couple. Following the Sultan's exile, İsmail Hakkı Pasha remarried with Ferhunde Hanım, the great-aunt of Prime Minister Bülent Ecevit.

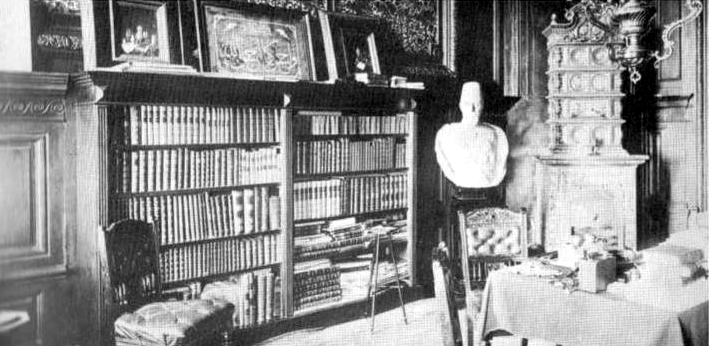
Tevfik Pasha's office in his mansion

== See also ==
- List of Ottoman grand viziers
- Ministry of Foreign Affairs (Ottoman Empire)

Political offices
Preceded by Said Halim Pasha	Minister of Foreign Affairs; 1899–1909	Succeeded by Mehmed Rifat Pasha
Preceded by Hüseyin Hilmi Pasha	Grand Vizier of the Ottoman Empire; 1909	Succeeded by Hüseyin Hilmi Pasha
Preceded by Ahmed Izzet Pasha	Grand Vizier of the Ottoman Empire; 1918–1919	Succeeded by Damat Ferid Pasha
Preceded by Damat Ferid Pasha	Grand Vizier of the Ottoman Empire; 1920–1922	Office abolished
