= Hüseyin Zekai Pasha =

Ottoman painter (1860–1919)

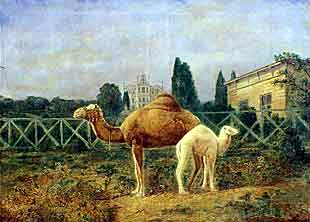
Camels

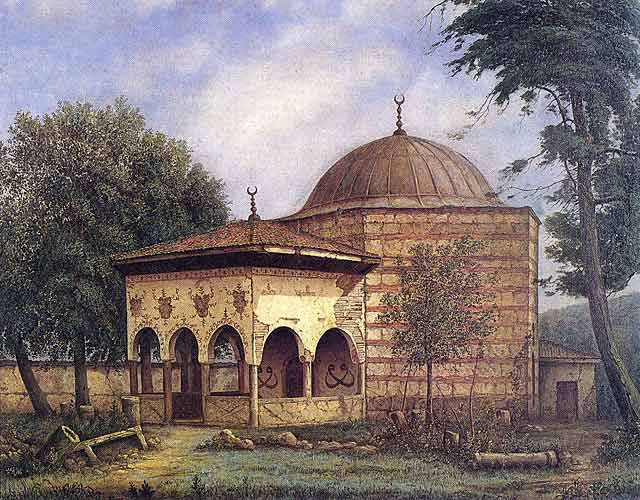
Mosque

Hüseyin Zekai Pasha (1860, Üsküdar - 1919, Üsküdar) was an Ottoman Turkish painter of landscapes, architectural scenes and still-lifes.

== Biography ==
After completing his primary education he entered the Kuleli Military High School, where he studied with Osman Nuri Pasha and Süleyman Seyyid. After graduation, he was enrolled at the Turkish Military Academy. His painting of the Turkish Navy performing night maneuvers in the Bosporus caught the attention of Sultan Abdul Hamid and, in 1883, he was appointed an aide to Şeker Ahmed Pasha with the rank of Lieutenant.

He soon became chairman of the "Military Construction Commission" and was chosen to accompany Kaiser Wilhelm II on a trip to Syria, as an expert on ancient structures. After Ahmed Pasha's death, he succeeded to his position as a court painter and chamberlain. In 1908, he helped organize the nation's first official military museum in the Hagia Irene.

He retired from service that same year with the rank of Brigadier-General but, in 1910, began working for the "Higher Education Office" (precursor of the Ministry of National Education). That same year, he started to participate in the "Galatasaray Exhibition" and modified his style, with impressionistic strokes and colors, rather than photographic realism.
