= Mehisti Hanım =

Consort of Ottoman Caliph Abdulmejid II

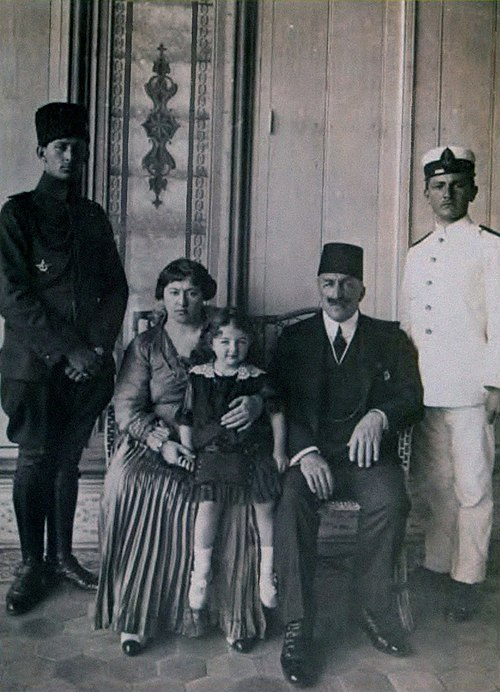
- Mehisti Hanim with her husband and daughter
- Born: Atiye Akalsba; 27 January 1892; Adapazarı, Istanbul, Ottoman Empire
- Died: c. 1964 (aged 71–72); London, England, United Kingdom
- Burial: Brookwood Cemetery, London, United Kingdom
- Spouse: Abdulmejid II (m. 1912; died 1944)
- Issue: Dürrüşehvar Sultan
Names
- Turkish: Atiye Mehisti Hanım; Ottoman Turkish: مہستی خانم
- House: Akalsba (by birth); Ottoman (by marriage)
- Father: Hacımaf Akalsba
- Mother: Safiye Hanım
- Religion: Sunni Islam

Mehisti Hanım (Ottoman Turkish: مہستی خانم, "moon's presence" or "moon's desire"; born Atiye Akalsba and called also Mehisti Kadın; 27 January 1892 – c. 1964) was the fourth consort of Abdulmejid II, the last Caliph of the Ottoman Caliphate.

== Early life ==
Mehisti Hanım was born in 1892 in Adapazarı, Istanbul. Born as Atiye Akalsba, she was a member of the Abkhazian noble family Akalsba. Her father was Hacımaf Bey Efendi Akalsba and her mother was Safiye Hanım. She had one brother, Fazıl Bey Akalsba, and two sisters, Mihridil Hanım Akalsba, and Mihrivefa Hanım Akalsba.

In 1895, at aged three, her father entrusted her to the Yıldız Palace's imperial harem with her sisters. Here her name was changed to Mehisti, according to the custom of the Ottoman court. She was then sent to the court of Şehzade Abdulmejid. She had blue eyes and long brown hair.

== Marriage ==
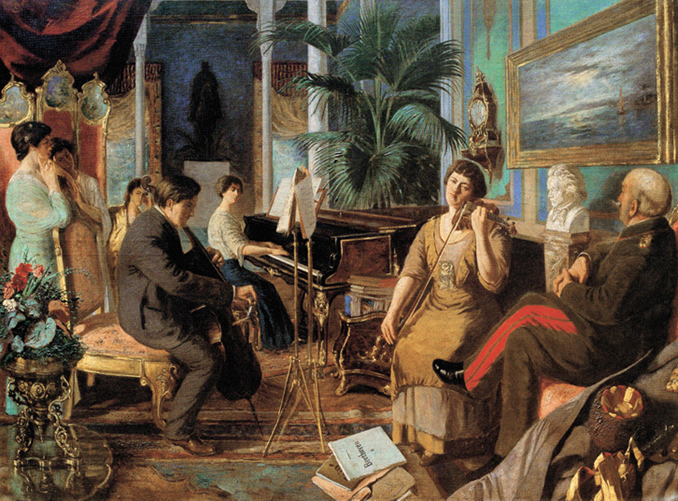
"Beethoven in the Harem" by Abdulmejid II, 1915. Mehisti is thought to have been one of the two women listening with rapt attention.

Mehisti married Abdulmejid on 16 April 1912 in the Bağlarbaşı Palace, as his third consort. Hatice Hayriye Ayşe Dürrüşehvar Sultan, the couple's only daughter, was born in the Çamlıca Palace, Çamlıca Hill, Çamlıca, on 26 January 1914.

Upon the exile of the imperial family in March 1924, she accompanied her husband and the other members of his entourage. They moved firstly to Switzerland and then to France where they settled in Paris. During exile, her daughter, Dürrüşehvar married Prince Azam Jah, the eldest son and heir of the last Nizam of Hyderabad, Osman Ali Khan, Asif Jah VII, at Nice, on 12 November 1931, in a double ceremony where Nilüfer Hanımsultan, cousin of Dürrüşehvar, and Moazzam Jah, brother of Azam were also wed. Dürrüşehvar went to live in India.

After her marriage, Dürrüşehvar took Mehisti with her. But, when the family traveled from India to Europe, and came to France, she and her daughter would stay with Abdulmejid. Neslişah notes that before Dürrüşehvar's marriage, Mehisti was allowed to eat in the second sitting, along with Abdulmejid's second consort Hayrünnisa Hanım, the fourth consort Bihruz Hanım, the secretaries Behruze and Ofelya and other Kalfas. However, after her marriage, Mehisti's position changed, and she was allowed to eat at the first sitting.

Abdulmejid was interested in classical music. At times, he would perform with his wives, and the Kalfas. He would be at the piano, Şehsuvar Hanım and Mehisti would play the violin, and Hayrünnisa Hanım the cello.

== Death ==
After Abdulmejid's death in 1944, Mehisti settled in London. She died in 1964, and was buried in Brookwood Cemetery. After Dürrüşehvar's death in 2006, she was buried beside her.

== Issue ==
Name	Birth	Death	Notes
Hatice Hayriye Ayşe Dürrüşehvar Sultan	26 January 1914	7 February 2006	Married once, and had issue, two sons

== See also ==
- Ottoman Imperial Harem

== Sources ==
- Bardakçı, Murat (2017). Neslishah: The Last Ottoman Princess. Oxford University Press. ISBN 978-9-774-16837-6.
- Sakaoğlu, Necdet (2008). Bu Mülkün Kadın Sultanları: Vâlide Sultanlar, Hâtunlar, Hasekiler, Kandınefendiler, Sultanefendiler. Oğlak Yayıncılık. ISBN 978-6-051-71079-2.
- Uçan, Lâle (2019). Son Halife Abdülmecid Efendi'nin Hayatı - Şehzâlik, Veliahtlık ve Halifelik Yılları (PDF) (PhD Thesis). Istanbul University Institute of Social Sciences.
