= Ahmet Ziya Akbulut =

Turkish painter

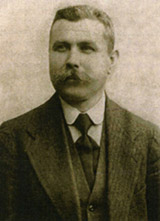
Ahmet Ziya Akbulut (c.1910s)

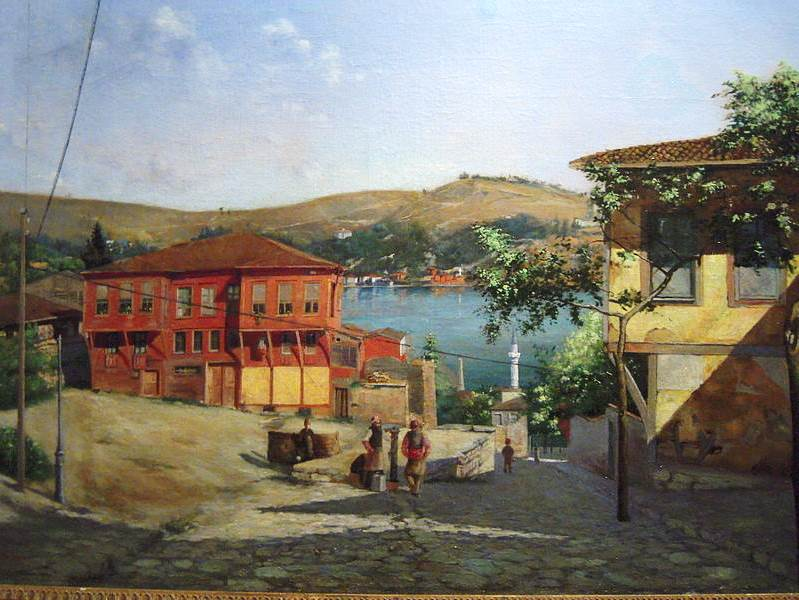
Istanbul Scene

Ahmet Ziya Akbulut (27 June 1869, Constantinople - 17 April 1938, Istanbul) was a Turkish landscape and architectural painter.

== Biography ==
He attended Kuleli Military High School, then went to the Turkish Military Academy and studied art with Osman Nuri Pasha. After graduating, he was assigned to the Ottoman Military College, where he worked until 1894, when he was promoted to captain and transferred to Kuleli.

In addition to the arts, he was well-versed in astronomy and mathematics. He used these skills to introduce more perspective into his work; something which was not a major part of traditional Turkish art. He also wrote a manual on the construction of sundials (Güneş Saatleri Yapım Kılavuzu), which was republished in 2010 by Biryıl Kültür Sanat.

In 1898, he became head of the "Military Printing Office" and, in 1913, was appointed Chairman of the "Ottoman Painter's Association". In 1914, he retired from the military and began teaching at the "Sanayi-i Nefise Mektebi" (School of Industry and Fine Arts), where he eventually became the Deputy Director.

In 1937, the "İstanbul Resim ve Heykel Müzesi" (Art and Sculpture Museum) was opened. Atatürk required every painter to contribute two paintings, to maintain their professional status, which prompted Akbulut to produce one of his best-known works, depicting the Sultan Ahmet Mosque.
