= Osman Nuri Pasha (painter) =

Turkish painter and military officer

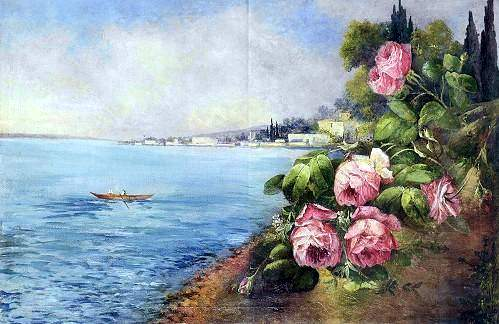
Roses with a View of Istanbul

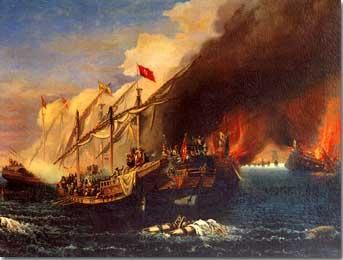
The Battle of Preveza

Osman Nuri Pasha (Turkish: Osman Nuri Paşa; c. 1839, Istanbul - 1906, Istanbul) was a Turkish painter and military officer.

== Biography ==
While his birth date has not been established, it is on record that he received his education in Istanbul, attending the Turkish Military Academy. In 1857, he received an appointment as a court painter; serving under Sultans Abdülmecid I and Abdülaziz, who gave him paintings by European artists, to serve as examples for his work.

As a court painter, he was eventually promoted to Brigadier General (Tuğgeneral) and became an art teacher at Kuleli Military High School. Most of Turkey's best-known painters were among his students, including Ahmet Ziya Akbulut, Hoca Ali Rıza, and Hüseyin Zekai Pasha. In 1877, during the Russo-Turkish War, he served as a military commander.

Although he painted landscapes, most of his paintings deal with military subjects; notably battles and warships. These include his depiction of the Battle of Preveza (which was one of the first Turkish paintings to use Western-style oil techniques), and the sinking of the frigate Ertuğrul, following a goodwill mission to Japan.
