= Abdülmecid II =

Ottoman caliph from 1922 to 1924

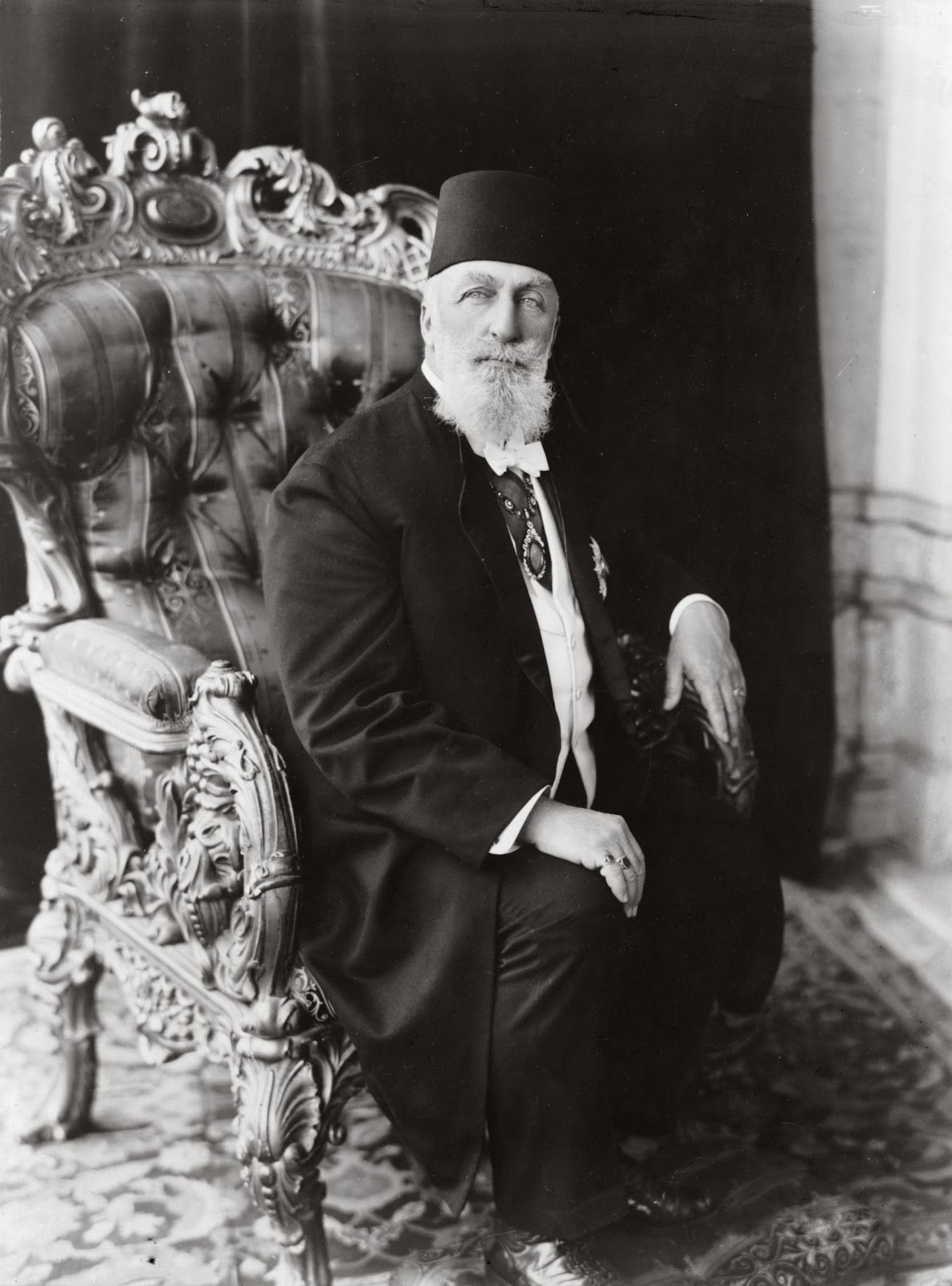
- Portrait by Jean Pascal Sébah, 1923

Ottoman caliph (Halîfe-i Müslimîn)
- Tenure: 19 November 1922 – 3 March 1924
- Predecessor: Mehmed VI
- Successor: Caliphate abolished

Head of the Osmanoğlu family
- Reign: 16 May 1926 – 23 August 1944
- Predecessor: Mehmed VI
- Successor: Ahmed Nihad
- Born: 29/30 May 1868; Beşiktaş, Istanbul, Ottoman Empire
- Died: 23 August 1944 (aged 76); Paris, France
- Burial: Al-Baqi Cemetery, Medina, Saudi Arabia
- Consorts: Şehsuvar Hanım (m. 1896) Hayrünnisa Hanım (m. 1902; died 1936) Atiye Mehisti Hanım (m. 1912) Mihrimah Bihruz Hanım (m. 1921)
- Issue: Şehzade Ömer Faruk; Dürrüşehvar Sultan
Names
- Abdülmecid bin Abdülaziz Han
- Dynasty: Ottoman
- Father: Abdulaziz
- Mother: Hayranidil Kadın
- Religion: Sunni Islam

Abdülmecid II or Abdul Mejid II (Ottoman Turkish: عبد المجید ثانی, romanized: ʿAbdü'l-Mecîd-i sânî; Turkish: II. Abdülmecid; 29 May 1868 – 23 August 1944), commonly known as Abdülmecid Efendi, was the last Ottoman caliph, the only caliph elected by the Grand National Assembly of Turkey, and head of the Osmanoğlu family from 1926 to 1944. Unlike previous caliphs, he used the title Halîfe-i Müslimîn ("Caliph of the Muslims") instead of Emîrü'l-Mü'minîn ("Commander of the Faithful").

He was also a relatively famous artist and a Turkish aesthete, interested in art, mainly literature, painting, and music, and ways to promote it in Turkey. After the abolition of the Ottoman caliphate, he was succeeded for several months by Hussein bin Ali, the Sharif and Emir of Mecca and King of the Hejaz, who was mostly recognized in the Arab world.

He died in Paris in 1944 and was buried as a caliph in Medina.

== Early life ==
Abdulmejid was born on 30 May 1868 at Dolmabahçe Palace to Sultan Abdulaziz and his consort Hayranidil Kadın. He was the younger brother of Nazime Sultan. He spent his early years at the Feriye Palace complex before moving to a palace in Çamlıca. He received private education but was proud of having joined artillery classes at the age of four. He was about eight years old when his father died after the 1876 coup d'état from either suicide or murder. He believed his father died from the latter cause and took offense from those that believed he killed himself.

Abdulmejid enjoyed athletics and supposedly had a robust physique. He considered Şerif Ali Haydar Bey, his brother-in-law Halid Pasha, and himself the best horseback riders of Istanbul. He was one of the strongest of his siblings, and claimed to be able to hold people weighing 100 kg on each arm. He often went hunting with his first cousin Şehzade Mehmed Vahdeddin in the hills of Çengelköy, and when returning, they would listen to a fasıl orchestra into the night. Other hobbies of his included wrestling, mounted shooting, swimming, and fencing—his sparring partner was an Austrian officer he happened to know.

From a young age, he showed interest in the arts. His mansion was a kind of salon or academy for Istanbul's artists and musicians. He would compose three or four movement chamber pieces to be played by his wives, kalfas, and apprentices. While officially confined to the palaces, he often skirted this restriction as he enjoyed talking with the people. He also had an interest in painting and was himself a painter, developing realist art in the Ottoman Empire. After the Young Turk Revolution, he was free from confinement and was a benefactor to the Ottoman Artist's Society. He was also a talented pianist. He was interested in literature and founded the Pierre Loti Society in 1920 to promote the works of the author and translate them into Turkish.

According to testimonies, he agreed with marriages between cousins within the Ottoman dynasty to reduce tensions within the dynasty.

=== Life as the crown prince ===
On 4 July 1918, Mehmed VI Vahdeddin became Sultan and Abdulmejid was named Veliahd.

British intelligence reported him to be a moderate man popular with the people with eloquent French. While his sympathies for the Kemalists were well known, he was also an Anglophile who had hired an English tutor for his son and had a portrait of Lord Palmerston hanging in one of his rooms. Though he sympathized with the Turkish Nationalist Movement, in an interview with The Morning Post he requested assistance from the international community lest Unionist dictatorship return to the Ottoman Empire, even though most of the Turkish nationalists were ex-Unionists. He held a deep personal enmity with Damat Ferid Pasha, whose appointments to the Grand Vizierate was greatly affecting his once close relationship with his cousin the Sultan.

British intelligence were suspicious he was going to defect to the nationalists. Mustafa Kemal Pasha (Atatürk) eventually attempted to recruit Abdulmejid to his cause, inviting him to lead the nationalist movement. Abdulmejid's prestige would increase the legitimacy of the nationalists' cause and decrease the pressure the nationalists faced by royalists. Initially, the crown prince was excited of the possibility to be the face of the nationalist movement. But after consulting trusted friends for a few days, including Ahmed İzzet Pasha, he believed his defection would cause much bloodshed and instability in the Ottoman family.

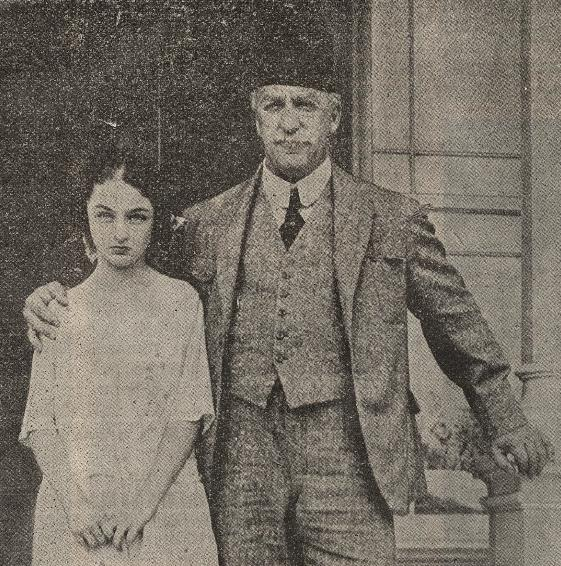
Prince Abdülmecid and Dürrüşehvar

On 7 September 1920, Ottoman police blockaded his residence of Dolmabahçe Palace, cutting supplies and communication to the outside world. His six-year-old daughter Princess Dürrüşehvar had whooping cough, but was not allowed medicine or a doctor. Grand Vizier Damat Ferid Pasha claimed the crown prince was going to escape to Anatolia on that day on his yacht, so under British pressure he was forced to cordon off his palace, but no order came from Occupation authorities and the move surprised even the Allied powers. On 23 September, High Commissioner De Robeck permitted Ferid to lift the siege, as they believed Abdulmejid was no longer interested in defecting. The siege continued for another month, only being lifted as a result of British shuttle diplomacy. Abdulmejid sent a scathing letter to his cousin Sultan Vahdeddin for putting such trust in Ferid Pasha and the British that was destroying the state. The Sultan's and the Crown Princes' once close relationship was effectively over, and mutual resentment would define their relationship from then on.

== Biography ==
=== Tenure as caliph ===
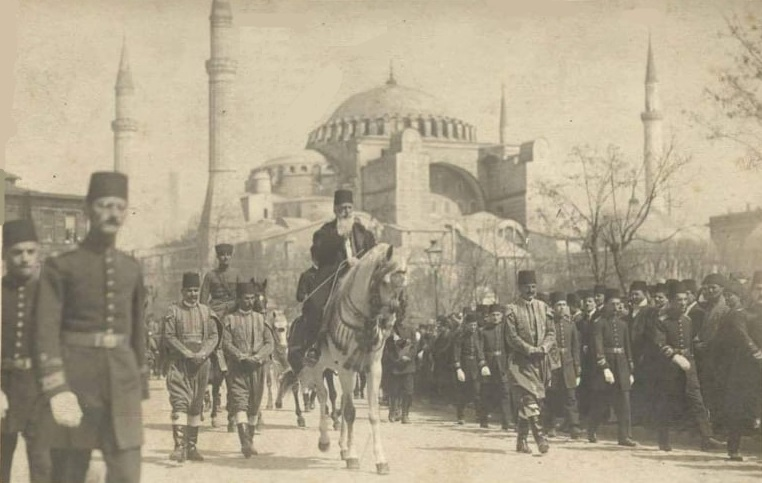
Abdülmecid Efendi on his route to be enthroned as Caliph

Once his cousin was deposed on 1 November 1922, the Ottoman Sultanate was abolished. But on 19 November 1922, Abdülmecid was elected caliph by the Grand National Assembly at Ankara. The caliph was nominally the supreme religious and political leader of all Muslims across the world, with the main goal to prevent extremism or protect the religion from corruption. He held his biat ceremony in Topkapı Palace, but the city's sharifs didn't attend. A march was composed for him called the "Medhiye-i Hazret-i Hilâfetpenâhi" by Kemani Eyüplü Mustafa Bey. He established himself in Istanbul on 24 November 1922. Though relations between them were strained, the Caliph and the Pasha maintained communication through a series of telegrams, with Abdulmejid offering his congratulations on Mustafa Kemal's marriage and expressing his condolences upon the death of his mother.

The choice of Abdulmejid as caliph was not evident for all Muslims, and there was significant criticism from within and outside the Ottoman Empire. There was indeed a conflict among Muslims, especially in Palestine, over whether to pledge allegiance to King Hussein's Sharifian Caliphate or the much shaken Ottoman Caliphate. Western colonial powers, such as France or the United Kingdom, were very attentive to these developments. Noteworthy critics of Abdul Mejid included Muhammad Rashid Rida, who claimed that he lacked some of the qualities needed to be the caliph, and the exiled Sheikh-ul-Islam Mustafa Sabri Efendi. The vast majority of Muslims seem to have chosen to recognize him, especially in British India.

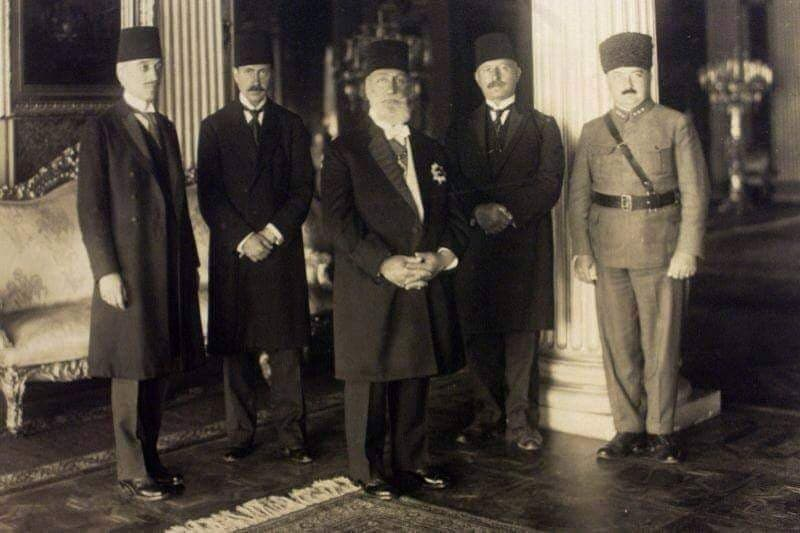
Abdülmecid Efendi being informed of his deposition as Caliph

As Caliph Abdulmejid was unhappy about the transfer of certain responsibilities from Istanbul to Ankara; for instance, he was angry about the relocation of a military band unit. He wanted his title to make him a head of state instead of president Mustafa Kemal Pasha. He soon requested a raise in his allowance, making his position a political issue. He received support from the conservatives in the parliament, and in December 1923, an open letter authored by the Aga Khan and Ameer Ali was published in the press requesting support for the Caliphate, else an Islamic world without a Caliphate would create discord. Prime Minister İsmet İnönü did not have a chance to review the petition before its publication in the newspapers and the government attacked Abdulmejid's supporters as promoting foreign interests. Kemalist propaganda used the fact that he occupied the infamous Yıldız Palace in Istanbul, and he was subsequently portrayed as having unjustly claimed it for himself.

In the last session of the budget negotiations on 3 March 1924, Urfa Deputy Sheikh Saffet Efendi and his 53 peers demanded the abolition of the caliphate, arguing it was not necessary any more. This was approved by majority of the votes and Law 431 was established. With the same law, it was decided to expel all members of the Ottoman family, and confiscate their property. Princesses were allowed 10 days to leave the country, princes 24 hours, and Abdulmejid was informed he was to leave immediately. For the second time, he had to deal with his residence being cordoned and communications cut by the government. When he was informed of the decision he said the following: "I am not a traitor. I will not leave here even if I die. How can they forcibly remove me from these lands that my ancestor Fatih conquered?"

Mustafa Kemal Atatürk, however, offered the caliphate to Ahmed Sharif as-Senussi, on the condition that he reside outside Turkey; Senussi declined the offer and confirmed his support for Abdulmejid. He was succeeded by Hussein bin Ali in the Arab world, with the support of his cousin, Mehmed VI but that attempt ended soon after with the Saudi conquest of Hejaz.

=== Life in exile (1924–1944) ===
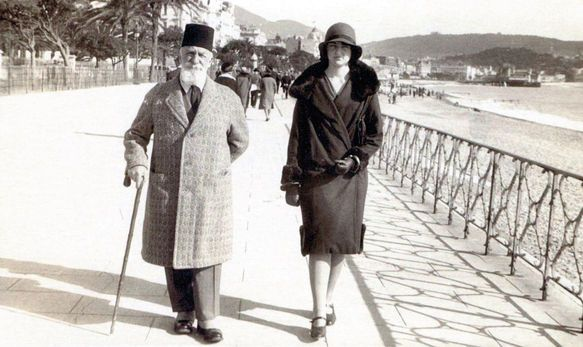
Abdülmecid II and Dürrüşehvar in Promenade des Anglais, Nice, France

Although Abdulmejid and his family were upset about this decision, they did not want the people to revolt, so with his wives Şehsuvar, Hayrünisa, and Mehistî, and his son Ömer Faruk, and daughter Dürrüşehvar, they secretly went to Çatalca by car from the Dolmabahçe Palace at 5:00 the next morning. Here, after being hosted by the head of the Rumeli Railways Company for a while, they were put on the Simplon Express. When he left Turkey, he traveled to Switzerland. However, contrary to expectations, he was not greeted by a delegation or ceremony but simply as an ordinary traveler. When Abdulmejid II arrived in Switzerland, he was detained at the border for a while, but was admitted to the country after a delay. In Switzerland, he said multiple times that the abolition of the caliphate was contrary to Sharia and illegitimate since it was abolished without the consent of all Muslims, and that this would bring chaos to the Islamic world and a rise of extremism. But after the Turkish government put pressure on the Swiss government, Abdulmejid was never allowed to give such speeches in Switzerland again. After staying in Switzerland for a while, he moved to Nice, France in October 1924.

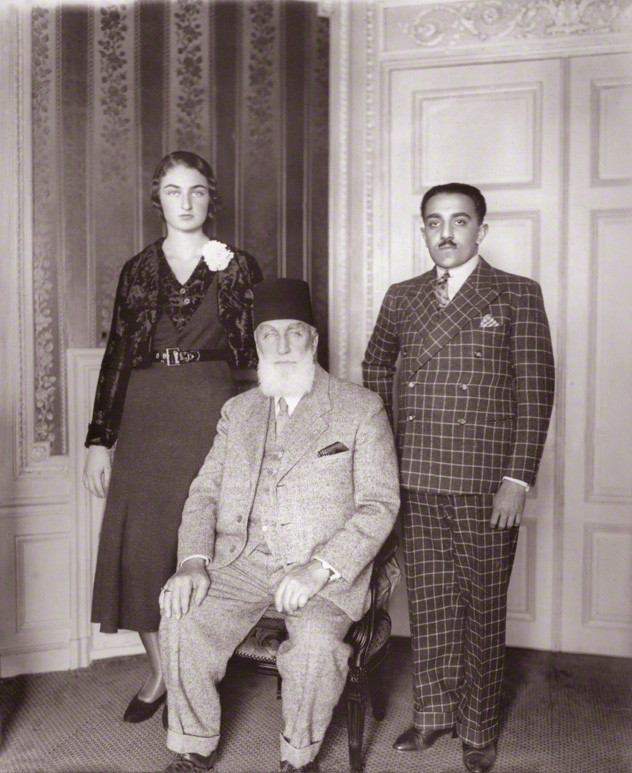
Princess Dürrüşehvar Sultan, Princess of Berar; Caliph Abdülmecid II of the Ottoman dynasty, and Nawab Azam Jah, Prince of Berar, 1931

Abdulmejid and his family lived a quiet life in Nice. They chose not to reside with Mehmed VI who had already established himself in Sanremo. Abdulmejid believed he alone should hold power of attorney to recover lost family properties in post Ottoman countries, especially in Iraq. Mehmed VI objected to Abdulmejid's use of the title Caliph because he never renounced the title for himself, and believed he should have power of attorney. This feud ended upon Mehmed's death in 1926, and in a conference of the royal family, Abdulmejid was effectively declared the familial patriarch. He believed in this conference that Mustafa Kemal's regime was soon to collapse, and a restoration of the monarchy was imminent, though this never happened.

He was also in a difficult financial situation, one third of his income came from the emir of Afghanistan and an Indian maharaja. In 1930 and 31 his daughter Dürrüşehvar Sultan and his niece Nilüfer Hanım Sultan married the sons of the Nizam of Hyderabad, one of the richest people in the world; thanks to this, his financial situation improved. As he did not get the anticipated support from the Islamic world for the restoration of the caliphate, he started to focus more on worship, painting, and music.

Abdulmejid, who later settled in Paris, used to perform Friday prayers at the Grand Mosque of Paris with other Muslims in the region. After the departure of his very fond grandchildren and son, who left France to marry the Kavala Egyptian royals, he spent painful days alone. He wrote a 12-volume book of memoirs, preserved by his daughter Dürrüşehvar Sultan.

== Death ==
On 23 August 1944, Abdulmejid II died at his house in the 15th Avenue du Maréchal Mounoury, Paris, due to a heart attack. His death coincided with the Liberation of Paris from the German occupation. Despite the efforts of Dürrüşehvar Sultan, the Turkish government did not permit his funeral to be held in Turkey. Subsequently, his remains were preserved at the Grand Mosque of Paris for ten years. Finally, when the mosque could no longer maintain his body, his body was subsequently moved to Medina, where he was then buried. His predecessor, Mehmed VI, was buried in Damascus, by Faisal I. This is explained by the prohibition imposed by the Kemalists, Atatürk and then İnönü, who prohibited the former caliph from being buried in Turkey.

His daughter had hoped to bury him in her in-laws' princely state of Aurangabad, India. However, due to circumstances arising from World War II, transporting his remains proved difficult. He was eventually laid to rest in Jannat al-Baqi. Dürrüşehvar Sultan remained deeply resentful that the Turkish Republic did not allow her father to be laid to rest on Turkish soil, and towards the end of her life, she expressed her wishes not to be buried in Turkey.

== Artistry and personality ==
=== Painting artist career ===
Abdulmejid was given the title of General in the Ottoman Army, but did not have strong military inclinations. He had a more significant role as Chairman of the Ottoman Artists' Society and was a personal friend of some Western painters, such as Fausto Zonaro, who was influential in art in the Ottoman Empire. He was also connected to the French artist Adolphe Thalasso, who dedicated some works to him.

He is considered one of the most important painters of late period Ottoman art. His paintings of the harem, showing a modern musical gathering, and of his wife, Şehsuvar Hanım, reading Goethe's novel Faust, express the influence of western Europe in his elite circle. These were displayed at a 1917 exhibition of Turkish art in Vienna. His personal self-portrait can be seen at the Istanbul Museum of Modern Art.

Abdulmejid was also an avid collector of butterflies, an activity that he pursued during the last 20 years of his life. His favourite magazine was Revue des deux Mondes.

=== Paintings ===
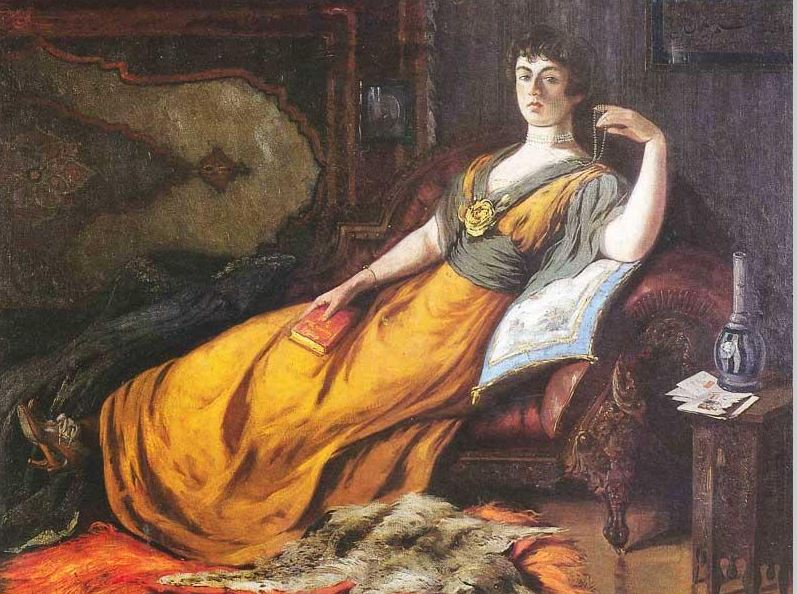
Haremde Goethe, 1898/1917, State Art and Sculpture Museum

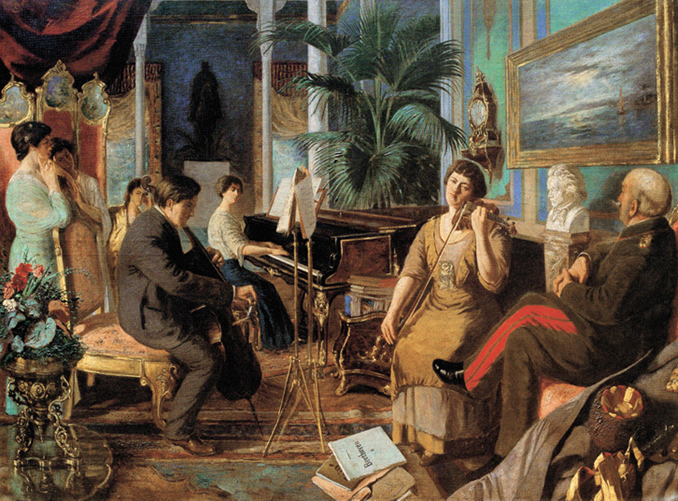
Haremde Beethoven, 1915, İstanbul State Art and Sculpture Museum

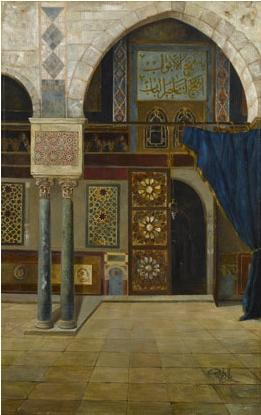
Cami Kapısı, 1920, Sakıp Sabancı Museum

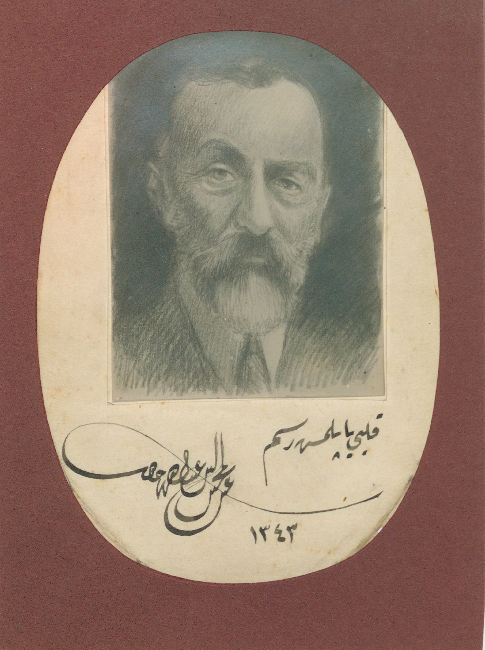
Painting of Abdülhak Hamit Tarhan, with the text in Ottoman Turkish saying, "made with the heart".

=== Personality ===
Murat Bardakçı described Abdulmejid as someone with a large ego and was easily agitated. His son Şehzade Ömer Faruk married the daughter of his cousin Rukiye Sabiha Sultana.

Abdulmejid and Vahdeddin would argue over the names of their grandchildren with Vahdeddin proposing simple and austere against Abdulmejid's august and elaborate suggestions. Abdulmejid wished for his first granddaughter to be named Neslişah where as with Vahdeddin wished Fatma, so she received both names. This argument and compromise would repeat with the namings of Zehra Hanzade Sultana and Necla Hibetullah Sultana.

== Honours and arms ==
=== Ottoman honours ===
- Order of House of Osman, Jeweled
- Order of Glory, Jeweled
- Imtiyaz Medal, Jeweled
- Order of Osmanieh, Jeweled
- Order of the Medjidie, Jeweled
- Iftikhar Sanayi Medal
- Imtiyaz War Medal in Gold
- Outstanding Navy Medal in Gold

=== Foreign honours ===
- Austria-Hungary: Grand-Cross Order of Leopold, 6 June 1918
- Persia: Order of the Crown, 2nd Class, 23 August 1919

=== Arms ===
Coat of Arms of the Caliph

== Family ==
=== Consorts ===
Abdülmecid II had four consorts:

- Şehsuvar Hanım (2 May 1881 – 1945). They married on 22 December 1896 and had a son.
- Hayrünnisa Hanım (2 March 1876 – 3 September 1936). She was born in Bandirma, Turkey. They married on 18 June 1902 in Ortakoy Palace. She died in Nice. Hayrünisa was extremely well educated and a cello virtuoso. She was portrayed by her husband while playing.
- Atiye Mehisti Hanım (27 January 1892 – 1964). She was born in Adapadari. They married on 16 April 1912 in Bağlarbaşı Palace and had a daughter. She died in London.
- Mihrimah Bihruz Hanım (24 May 1903 – 1955). She was born in İzmit. They married on 21 March 1921 in Çamlıca Palace. She died in Istanbul.

=== Issue ===
Abdülmecid II had a son and a daughter:

- Şehzade Ömer Faruk (27 February 1898 - 28 March 1969) - with Şehsuvar Hanım. Married twice with two his cousins and had three daughters by his first marriage.
- Hatice Hayriye Ayşe Dürrüşehvar Sultan (26 January 1914 - 7 February 2006) - with Mehisti Hanım. She married an Indian prince and had two sons.
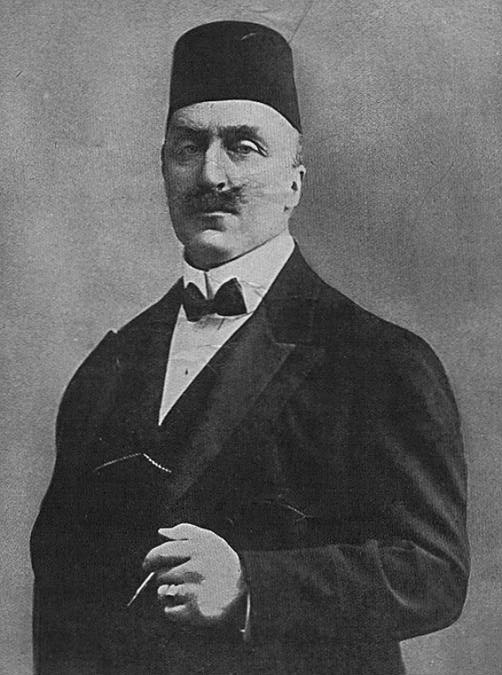
Prince Abdülmecid

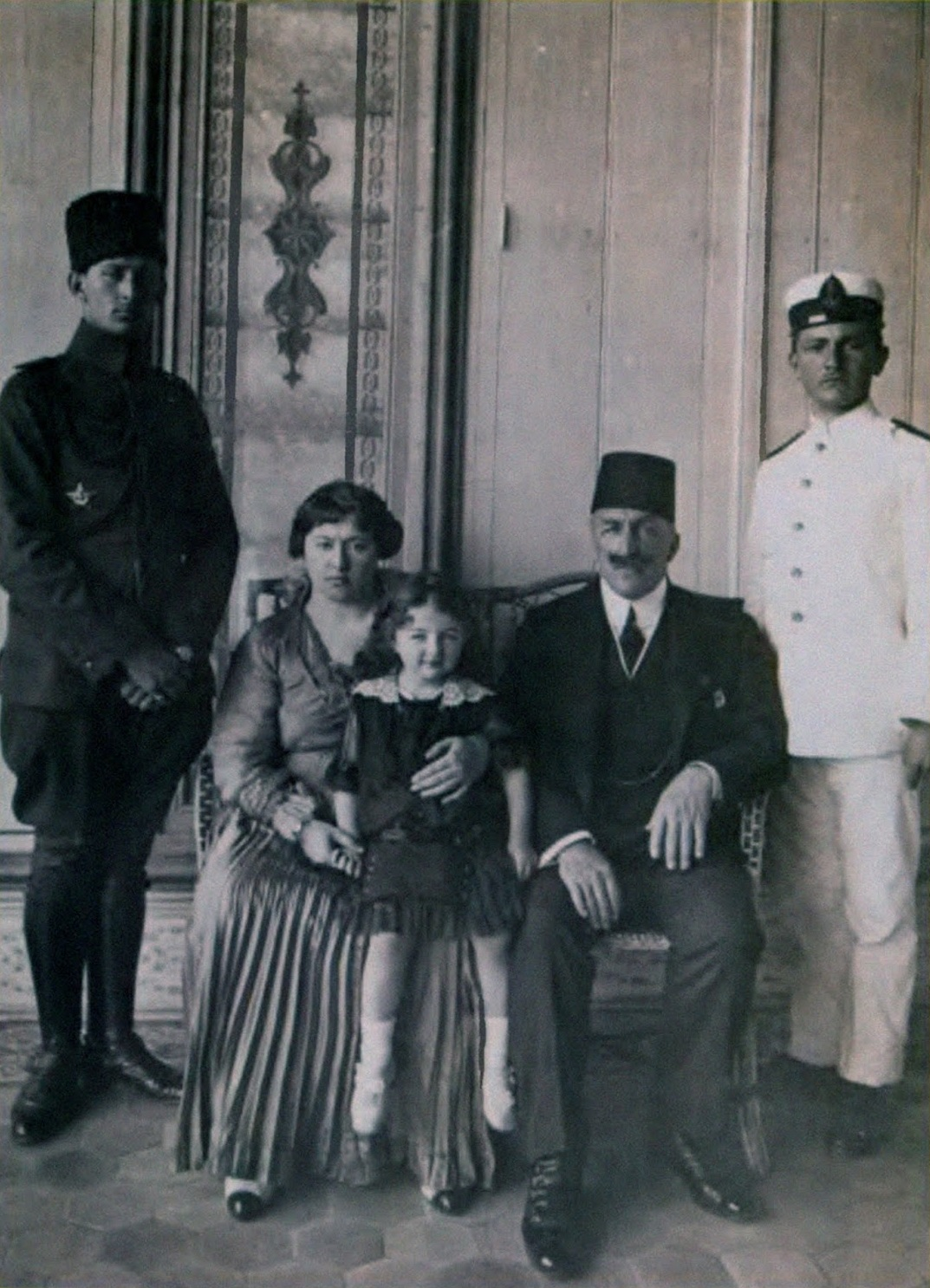
Abdülmecid with his daughter Dürrüşehvar and fourth wife Mehisti Hanım

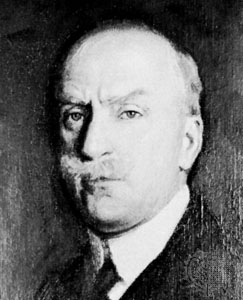
Portrait of Prince Abdülmecid in Topkapı Palace Museum

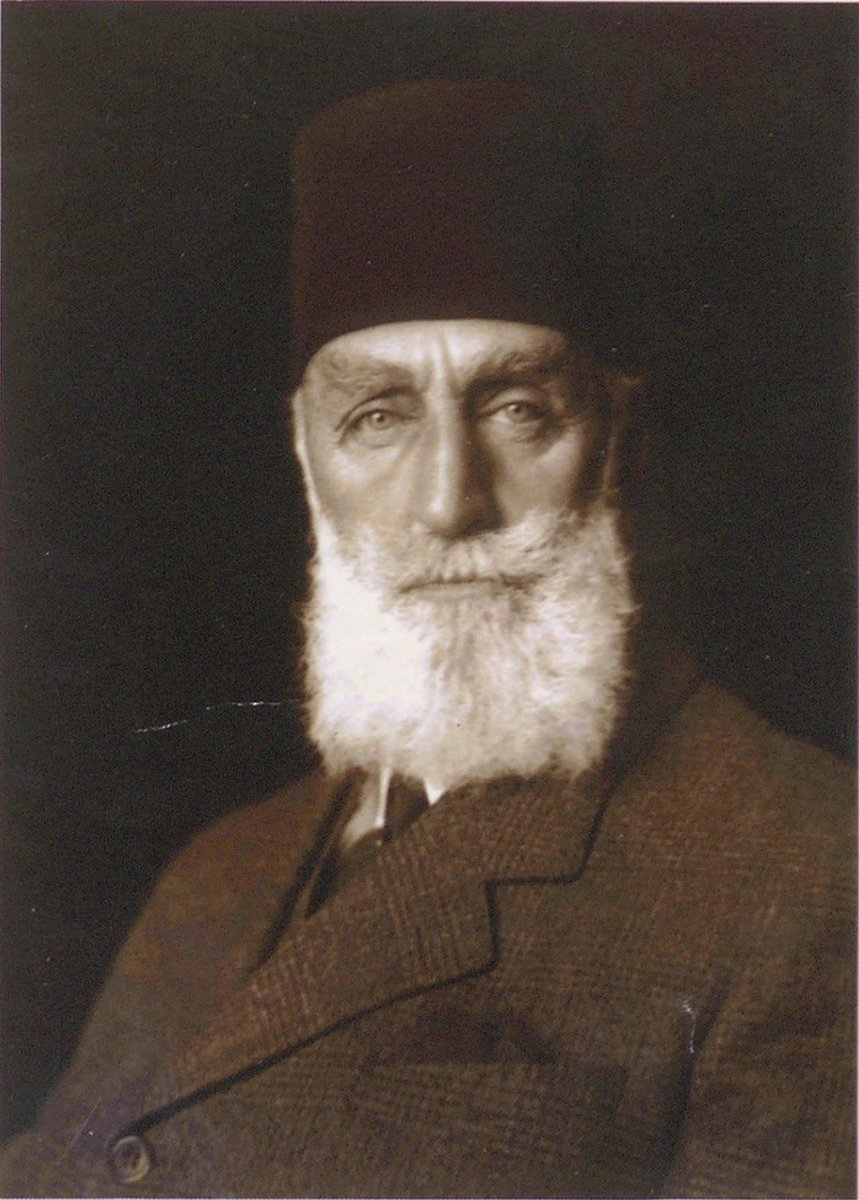
Caliph Abdülmecid II

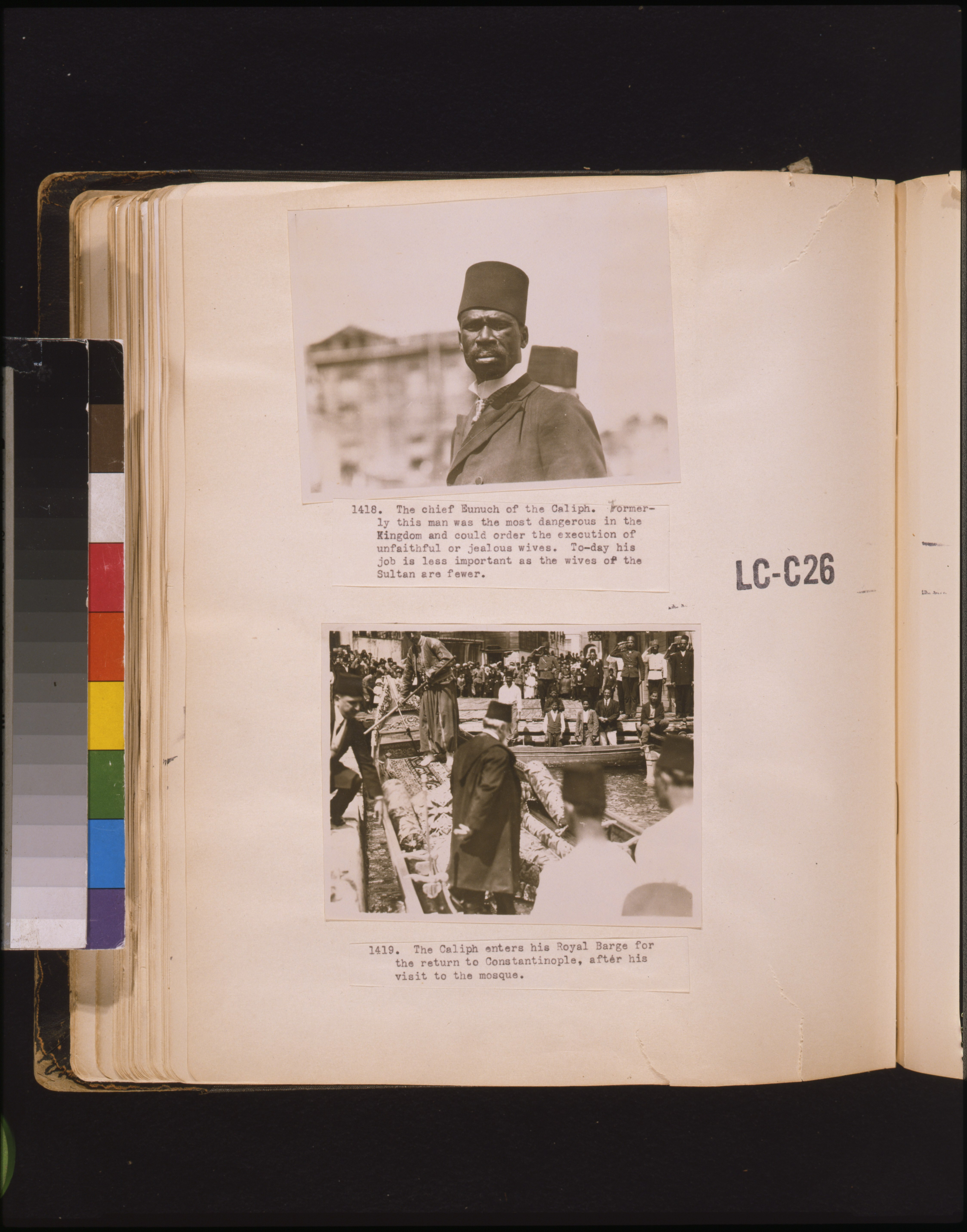
Top: The Chief Eunuch of the Caliph
Bottom: The Caliph enters his Royal Barge

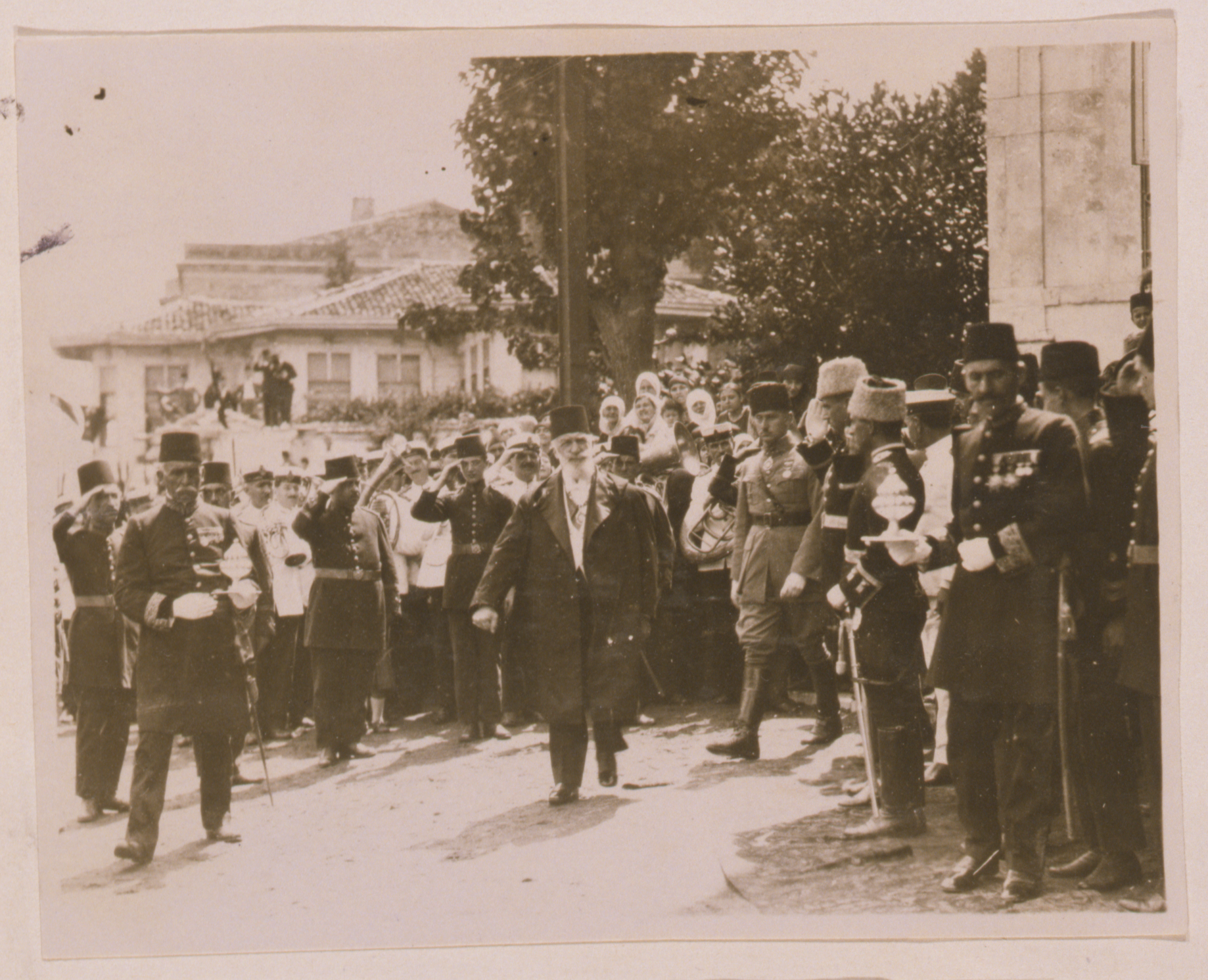
The Caliph walking with entourage of soldiers, officials and a brass band as women watch

== See also ==
- Osmanoğlu family
- Line of succession to the former Ottoman throne
- List of burials at Jannat al-Baqī

== Bibliography ==
- Bardakçı, Murat (1998). Şahbaba: Osmanoğulları'nın Son Hükümdarı Vahdettin'in Hayatı, Hatıraları ve Özel Mektupları. Pan Yayıncılık-İnkılâp Kitabevi. ISBN 9751024536.
- Özcan, Azmi (1997). Pan-Islamism: Indian Muslims, the Ottomans and Britain, 1877–1924. Brill. ISBN 90-04-10632-4.
- Özoğlu, Hakan (2011). From Caliphate to Secular State: Power Struggle in the Early Turkish Republic. ABC-CLIO. ISBN 9780313379567.
- Uçan, Lâle (2019). Son Halife Abdülmecid Efendi'nin Hayatı – Şehzâlik, Veliahtlık ve Halifelik Yılları (PDF) (PhD Thesis). Istanbul University Institute of Social Sciences.

Abdülmecid II House of Osman Born: 29 May 1868 Died: 23 August 1944
Sunni Islam titles
Preceded by Mehmed VI	Last Caliph of the Ottoman Caliphate; 19 November 1922 – 3 March 1924	Vacant Abolition of the Caliphate (Briefly claimed by Hussein bin Ali)
Preceded by Mehmed VI	Custodian of the Two Holy Mosques; 19 November 1922 – 3 March 1924	Vacant Abolition of the Caliphate Title next held by Fahd bin Abdulaziz Al Saud
Preceded by Mehmed VI	Head of the Osmanoğlu family 16 May 1926 – 23 August 1944	Succeeded by Ahmed Nihad
