= Süleyman Seyyid =

Turkish painter and art teacher (1842–1913)

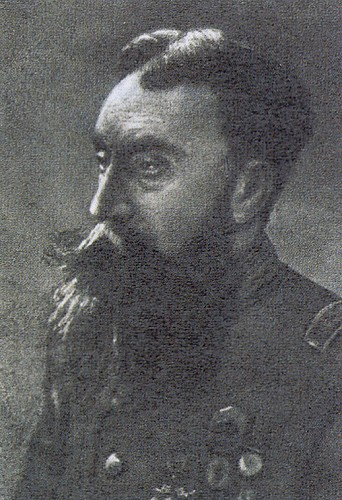
Süleyman Seyyid (Self-portrait?; date unknown)

Süleyman Seyyid Bey (1842, Istanbul - 1913, Istanbul) was a painter and art teacher from the Ottoman Empire. He is primarily known for his still-lifes. He taught art in military schools for 36 years and is considered to be a member of the first generation of modern Turkish painters in the Ottoman Empire.

== Early life ==
Süleyman Seyyid was born in Istanbul, Turkey in 1842 to a noble Anatolian family. His father was Haci Ismail Efendi, one of the notables of Anatolian Maltepesi. His grandfather, after whom he was named, was a well-known master craftsman who specialized in mother-of-pearl inlays. Süleyman Seyyid lived a pious lifestyle, valuing modesty and refuting material rewards and possessions.

As a child, Süleyman Seyyid used the name Esseyid Suleiman. However, after completing his primary education and later studies at the Turkish Military Academy, he went by Seyyid. At school, his charcoal sketches and watercolor paintings caught the attention of one of his teachers, Giovanni Schranz (1794-1882), a Maltese painter who was visiting Istanbul at the time. Schranz encouraged Seyyid to pursue art as a career path.

== Career ==
After graduating from the Turkish Military Academy as a lieutenant in 1862, Süleyman Seyyid traveled to Paris to attend a special school established for Turkish students called the Ottoman School in Paris. After his time at that school, he later studied at the École des Beaux Arts in Paris, France in the studios of Alexandre Cabanel for about 8 years. There he learned integral skills in representing spatial and figural volume. Süleyman Seyyid had great success with his paintings and received an award for his paintings of lilacs. He later became well known in Turkey for his artistic abilities and technical proficiency.

After working in Rome for about a year, he returned to Istanbul in 1871 to paint and to bring the influence of his Parisian teachers to Turkey.

Süleyman Seyyid became an art teacher at both the military and medical academies with hopes to instill some more knowledge of the arts among the working professionals. As he was one of the first Ottoman Turkish artists to be educated in Paris, Süleyman Seyyid is credited with bringing Western-style painting and its techniques to the Ottoman Empire. Turkish art historians have credited such artists as bringing the “true” Western practices learned directly at the Parisian academies, as opposed to past imitations.

He first started out teaching French at the Military Academy. After the death of the school's painting teacher, Abraham Bey, Süleyman Seyyid was appointed as the new painting teacher at the school. Together with Şeker Ahmet Paşa, another returning artist from Paris, they taught painting to the students at the military academy. Due to growing disagreements between Süleyman Seyyid and Şeker Ahmet Paşa, Seyyid resigned from the teaching position in 1880.

Seyyid next went to teach at the Kuleli Military High School in 1880. Four years later, in 1884, he was repositioned to the military medical school as a painting teacher and ended up teaching there for the next 26 years until 1910. His teaching style emphasized geometry and perspective construction, as expressed in his 880-page unpublished illustrated work called “The Science of Perspective” (Fenn-i Menazir). Additionally, he was known for entertaining and amusing his students with his oppositional ideas during their drawing and painting classes.

As Süleyman Seyyid had taught at military schools for a total of 36 years, he rose to the rank of Colonel (Miralay) in 1910 and became a very well known artist among officers, doctors, and other professionals. During those 36 years, he organized exhibitions with the intention to familiarize the Ottoman public with Western styles of painting. He gave French language and painting lessons to children of more wealthy families, and wrote articles on art for Istikbal and Ottoman newspapers.

== Later life ==
After he retired with the rank of Colonel (Miralay) in 1910, he moved to Sarıyer, the northernmost district of Istanbul, Turkey. An intensely spiritual man, he apparently gave away most of his works and never received any financial benefits from them while he was alive.

Süleyman Seyyid died on September 23, 1913, in Istanbul, Turkey at the age of 71. He was buried in the Ortaçeşme cemetery in Sarıyer, Turkey. As he was never fond of material things and didn't earn money for his paintings, it is uncertain as to how many paintings he did in his lifetime, however it is said that he had about 200 works. It is possible to find his pieces in the halls of old families that have been in Istanbul for generations, and there are very few in museums.

== Work ==
Süleyman Seyyid was most commonly known for his still-life paintings which appeared in the genre of Western traditional paintings, but also offered political statements regarding the rapid modernization of the world. In contrast to the Orientalist painters at this time, Süleyman Seyyid's pieces included all natural objects such as oranges, lilacs, figs, watermelon, and tulips. All elements were common parts of the Ottoman experience with nature. Specifically, he chose elements from Üsküdar, a densely populated district of Istanbul, Turkey where he found many subjects as a source of beauty. Additional places he found such beauty in were Çamlıca, Kısıklı, Bulgurlu, Hekimbaşı, Dudullu, Kayışdağı, Alemdağ, and Fenerbahçe.

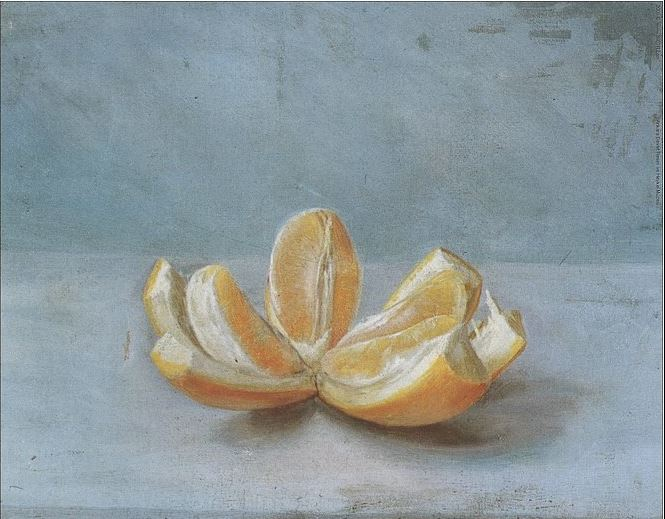
Still-life with Orange.

His best known piece of artwork is his still-life painting of a peeled and segmented orange. It is classified under the theme of vanitas adopted from the West. He “applied European painting techniques to subjects that were often already part of the Ottoman culture of images.” Essentially he translated existing Ottoman visual techniques and strategies into a new form.

His painting, “Still Life with Orange”, is now on display in the Ankara Painting and Sculpture Museum Collection. It is a masterpiece among the many works of Süleyman Seyyid. His artistic choices to emphasize objects such as fruit and flowers, which were already common among Ottoman tile and fabric traditions, in conjunction with his spatial and lighting techniques from Western painting traditions caused his work to stand out. It stood out in a way that suggested a political viewpoint putting emphasis on positivism, but also felt grounded in traditional Ottoman traditions.
