= Hoca Ali Rıza =

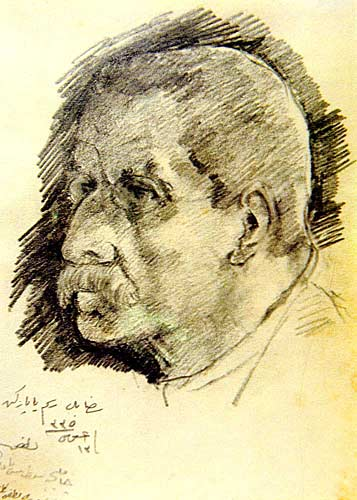
Self-portrait (1909)

Hoca Ali Rıza (1858 in Üsküdar – 20 March 1930 in Üsküdar) was a Turkish painter and art teacher, known primarily for his Impressionist landscapes and architectural paintings.

== Biography ==
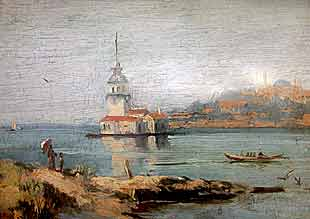
The Maiden's Tower (1894)

Hoca Ali Rıza's father was a cavalry major and an amateur calligrapher. After completing his basic education, he attended Kuleli Military High School, continuing to the Turkish Military Academy, where he studied art with Osman Nuri Pasha and Süleyman Seyyid.

In 1881, he received an award from Sultan Abdülhamid II. Three years later, he graduated with the rank of Lieutenant and was appointed an assistant to Nuri Pasha. He had been planning to continue his studies in Naples, but had to cancel his plans, due to a cholera epidemic.

In 1891, he became part of a government commission examining Turkish-Islamic artefacts. Four years later, he was promoted to Kolağası (Senior Captain) and began working as a designer at the new Imperial Porcelain Factory. He also worked with Fausto Zonaro, who was teaching painting to a local dignitary's wife at Yıldız Palace.

During the Greco-Turkish War, he was a war artist in Ionia. In 1903, he served on a commission to create the Türk Esliha-i Antika Müzesi (Museum of Antiquities). Six years later, he became head of the Military Publications Office where he served for two years. During those years, he was also chairman of the Ottoman Painters Association. In 1911, he retired holding the rank of Yarbay (Lieutenant Colonel).

In 1914, he began teaching landscape painting at the School of Fine Arts (now the Mimar Sinan Fine Arts University). After cutbacks by the Ministry of Education, he moved to the Çamlıca Girls' High School, where he taught for three years before moving to another girls' school in Üsküdar and then, in 1929, to a boys' school, where he was teaching at the time of his death.

His last exhibition, organised by Celal Esat Arseven, a painter and member of Parliament, was in Paris in 1928. His work remained important during the early years of the Republic and, even after his death, his paintings were shown at state-sponsored exhibitions. In 1933, the Ankara Halkevi featured his work in its first exhibition, one of what would become sixteen solo exhibitions, which confirmed his reputation as a master of landscape painting.

In 2022 a selection of his works were showcased at an exhibition in the old Galatasaray post office building on İstanbul's İstiklal Caddesi during the Beyoğlu Kültür Yolu (Cultural Road) festival.

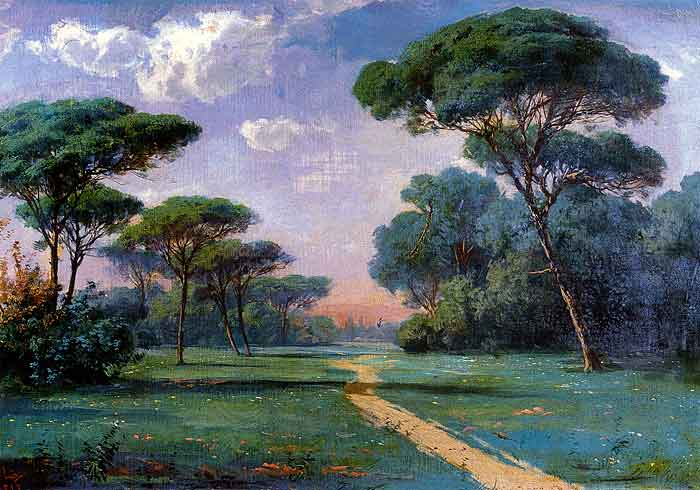
Landscape (1898)
