= Ibrahim Fehmi Pasha =

Ibrahim Fehmi Paşa (born 1838, and died 1896) was a prince of the Ottoman Empire.

He graduated from Kuleli Military High School in 1863, then from the Military Academy (Mc. ektebi Harbiyeyi Şahane) in 1867 in Constantinople. Prince Ibrahim was appointed with full powers in military and civilian affairs in Baghdad in 1891. A provisional law granted him emergency powers in May of that year. All cabinet decrees from Constantinople related to Baghdad became subject to his approval.

== Education ==
Upon receiving a Western education in France, where he attended the école d'état major, he returned home, on the death of his elder brother and became heir to his uncle, Ismail Pasha, Wali of Egypt and Sudan. Ismail employed him in the next few years on missions abroad, to the Pope, the Emperor Napoleon III and the Sultan of Ottoman Empire. In 1869 he was dispatched at the head of an army of 18,000 to quell an insurrection in Sudan, and this he successfully accomplished.

== Personal life ==
He was married to Lady Nevcivan (1857-1940); they had one son, Prince Ahmad Seyfeddin Ibrahim (1881-1937).
