= Hayrünnisa Hanım =

Consort of Abdülmecid II

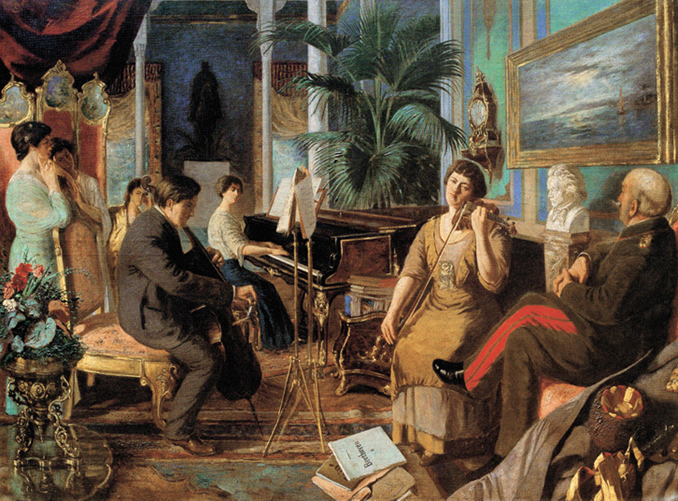
- Beethoven in the harem, painting by her husband Abdülmecid II. Hayrünnisa is shown in white on the left
- Born: 2 March 1876; Bandırma, Balıkesir Province, Ottoman Empire
- Died: 3 September 1936 (aged 60); Nice, France
- Consort of: Abdulmejid II (m. 1902)
- House: Ottoman (marriage)
- Religion: Sunni Islam

Hayrünnisa Hanım (also Hayrünnisa Kadın, Ottoman Turkish: خير النساء خانم, lit. 'better among women'; 2 March 1876 – 3 September 1936) was the second consort of Abdulmejid II, the last Ottoman caliph.

== Biography ==
Hayrünnisa, whose birth name is unknown, was born on 2 March 1876 in Bandırma, into an upper middle class or lower nobility family of Circassian Ubykh origins. Several of her relatives served as ladies-in-waiting at the Ottoman court in Istanbul, so Hayrünnisa was sent there under the tutelage of an aunt. She received a good education and became known as a cultured and educated woman, as well as a virtuoso on the cello.

Eventually, she was noticed by one of the princes, Şehzade Abdülmecid, a painter and music lover. On 18 June 1902, at Ortaköy Palace, Hayrünnisa became his second consort, after Şehsuvar Hanım. The marriage was childless. Abdülmecid portrayed Hayrünnisa in at least two paintings: a solo portrait of her performing on the cello and a group portrait of his family, entitled Beethoven in the Harem.

On 1 November 1922, the Sultanate was abolished and Mehmed VI, Abdulmecid's cousin, was deposed. However, Abdülmecid was chosen to inherit the symbolic-religious title of Caliph and, consequently, moved with his family to Dolmabahçe Palace. Less than a year later, on 29 October 1923, the abolition of the caliphate was also decreed, and on 3 March 1924, the expulsion decree was issued for all members of the Ottoman dynasty, who were to leave the country within a few days. That same evening, government officials escorted Abdülmecid and his family to Çatalca station, where they were given 2,000 pounds and visas for Switzerland.

From Switzerland, in October they moved to Nice, France, where many of the dynasty's members had gathered. Hayrünnisa died there on 3 September 1936.
