= Çamlıca, Üsküdar =

Neighborhood of Istanbul

Coordinates: 41°00′54″N 29°03′54″E

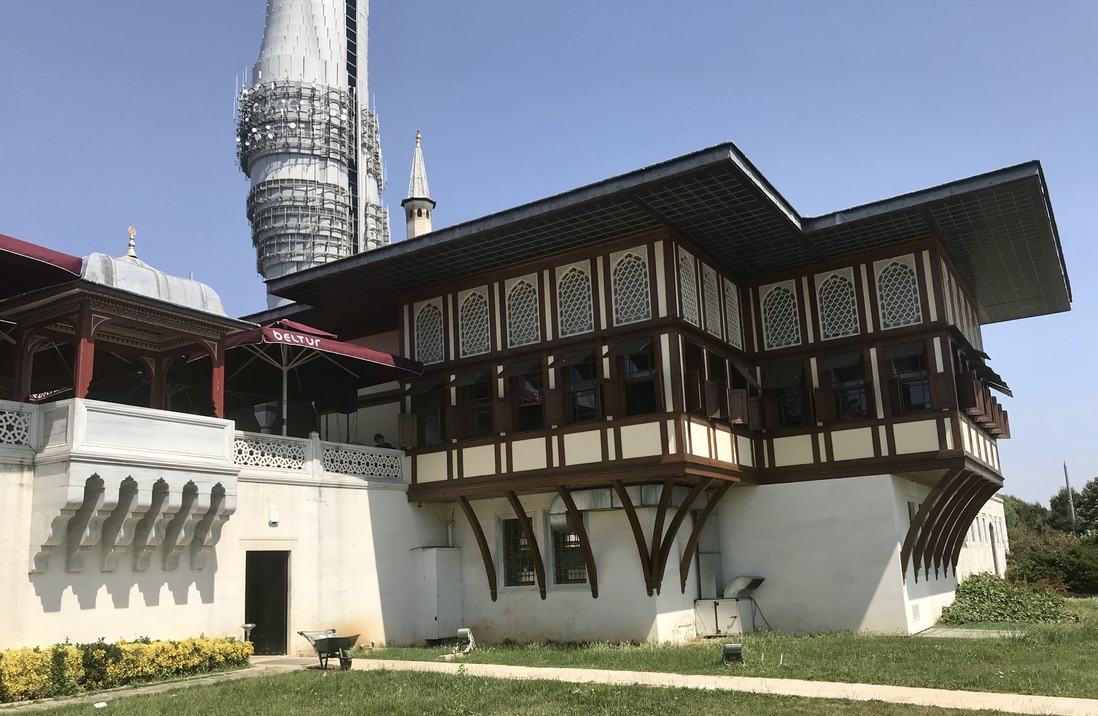
Cihanumma Kiosk on Little Çamlıca Hill with Çamlıca Tower behind it. The stone structure jutting out on the left is a copy of the Iftariye Kiosk in Topkapı Palace, Istanbul.

Çamlıca is a leafy district of Üsküdar on the Asian side of Istanbul. It is famous for two hills—Big Çamlıca (Büyük Çamlıca in Turkish, 268m) and Little Çamlıca (Küçük Çamlıca in Turkish, 229m)—offering panoramic views across the Sea of Marmara and the Princes' Islands to the European side of Istanbul and Sarayburnu. Historically, these were renowned beauty spots although by the end of the 20th century modern development had detracted from that beauty, not least when a series of radio and television towers were built on the hills.

Among the artists to leave drawings of the panoramic view from Büyük Çamlıca in its 19th-century heyday was the Usküdar-born artist Hoca Ali Rıza.

Çamlıca can be reached on the M5 Metro line from Üsküdar at Kısıklı and Bulgurlu stations.

== Attractions ==
=== Büyük Çamlıca Mosque ===
In 2019 Turkey's largest mosque, the Great Çamlıca Mosque (Büyük Çamlıca Cami in Turkish), opened on Big Çamlıca Hill. It is only the third mosque in Turkey to have six minarets and can be seen from much of the centre of the city.

=== Çamlıca Tower ===
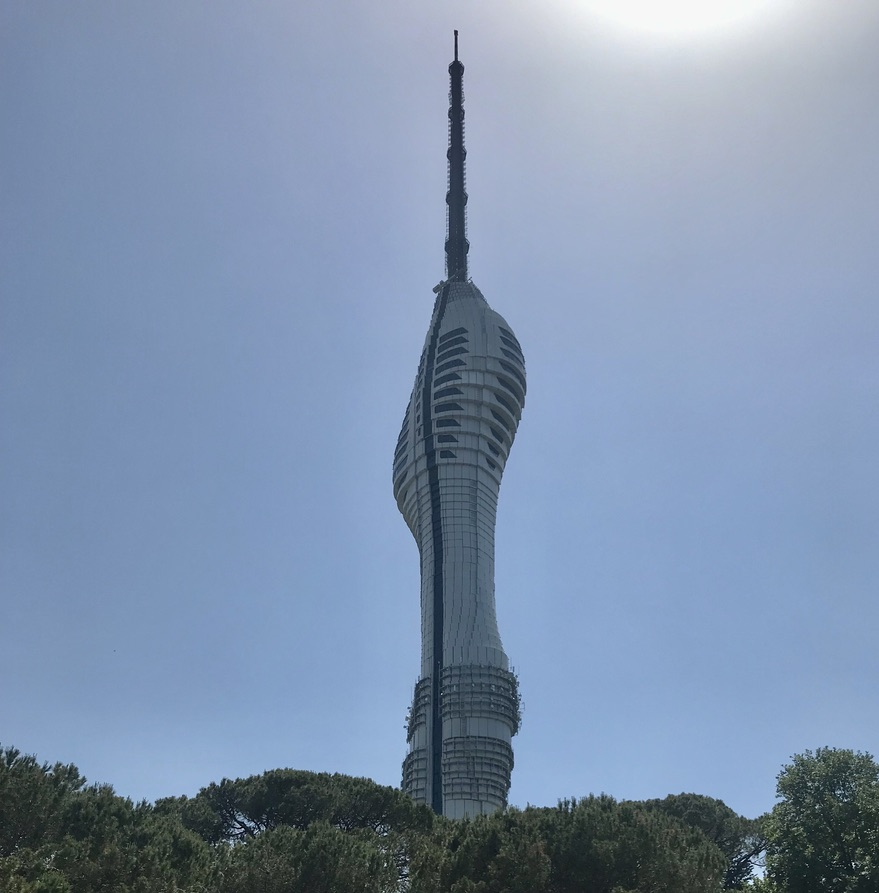
Çamlıca Tower on Little Çamlıca Hill

In 2021 the 369m-high Çamlıca Tower (Çamlıca Kulesi in Turkish) opened on Little Çamlıca Hill, in an attempt to bring all the radio and television masts together in one structure. It is open to the public and contains a restaurant with spectacular Istanbul city views.

=== Küçük Çamlıca Wood (Küçük Çamlıca Korusu) ===
From as early as 1654 in the reign of Sultan Mehmed IV this woodland area near Kısıklı Metro station was landscaped and is now full of mature deciduous and evergreen trees. In 1940 Istanbul Governor Lütfı Kırdar had it turned into a public recreation area, now very popular with picnickers. It now merges seamlessly with Küçük Çamlıca Hill with the Çamlıca Tower looming above it.

Right beside the woodland is the modern Çilehane Cami, built beside a small 17th-century stone building, much restored over the centuries, where a holy man named Aziz Mahmud Hüdayı Efendi once lived with his family in two simple rooms.

=== Çamlıca Girls High School ===
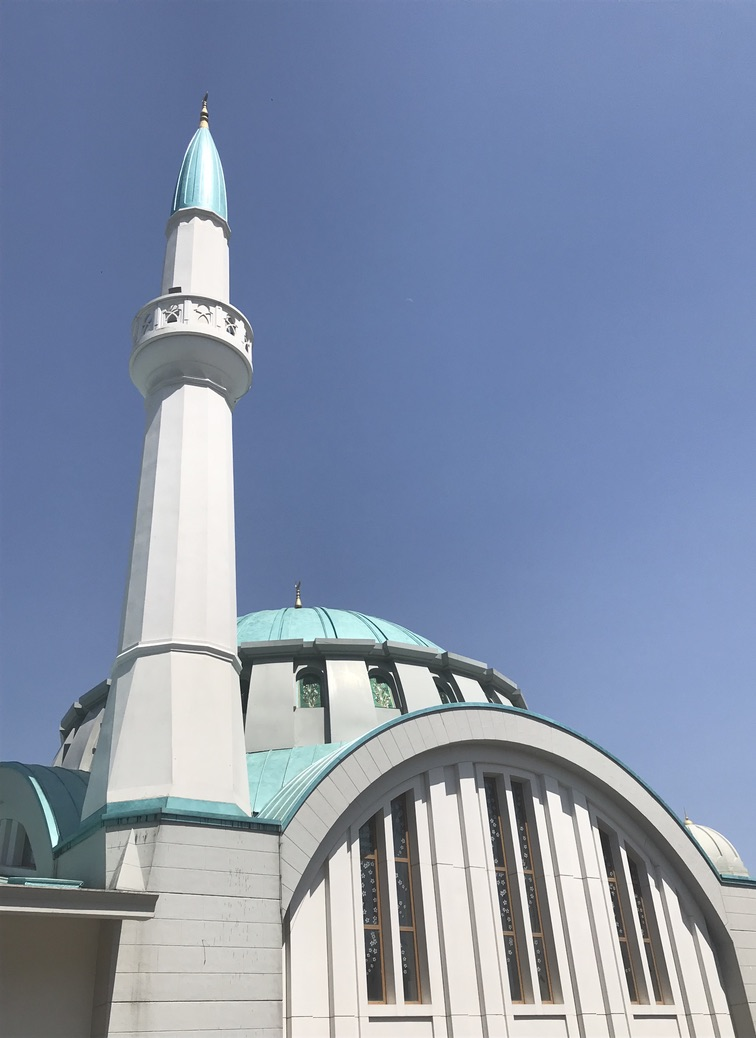
Çilehane Cami, Küçük Çamlıca

In the Acıbadem neighbourhood of Çamlıca stands a crumbling wooden mansion designed by architect Kemaleddin Bey for the Vice-Admiral Ahmed Ratıp Paşa. The pasha never got to live in his mansion because of a scandal over the funding of the Hejaz railway, and in 1938 it was converted to house the local high school for girls. This has since been moved into a modern building, leaving the mansion to its fate.
