= Şeker Ahmed Pasha =

Turkish painter (1841–1907)

"Şeker" Ahmed Pasha
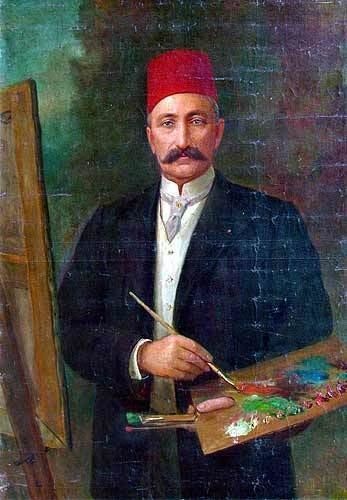
- Self-portrait
- Born: Ahmed Ali Pasha; 1841; Istanbul, Ottoman Empire (modern Turkey)
- Died: 1907 (aged 65–66); Istanbul, Ottoman Empire, (modern Turkey)
- Known for: Painter

Ahmed Ali Pasha (1841 – 5 May 1907), better known as "Şeker" Ahmed Pasha, was an Ottoman painter, soldier and government official. His nickname "Şeker" meant "sugar" in Turkish, which he earned due to his very easy-going nature.

== Biography ==
Born in Üsküdar, Istanbul he entered medical school in 1855, then transferred to the military academy. Here, he showed an interest in painting, his medical and military experience having aroused an interest in anatomy and perspective. Sultan Abdülaziz liked his work and sent him to Paris immediately after Süleyman Seyyid, to study under Gustave Boulanger and Jean-Léon Gérôme. He spent seven years of study in France, and had an exhibition of his oil paintings in Paris in 1869. He returned to Istanbul in 1871, with a military rank of captain.

In 1873, with the assistance of the French painter, Pierre-Désiré Guillemet, he organized and presented one of the first art exhibits in Istanbul. "Şeker" Ahmed Pasha advanced rapidly in military rank. In 1876, he was promoted to major, in 1877 lieutenant colonel, in 1880 colonel, in 1885 brigadier general, and, finally, in 1890 to lieutenant general. In 1896 he was placed in charge of official military protocol.

"Şeker" Ahmed Pasha is one of the most important examples of the Ottoman military painters. He painted nature-related subjects such as forests, fruits, flowers, and animals with great skill. His life and art reflects the experience of Ottoman elites in the aftermath of the Tanzimat reform movement, which sought to learn more of Western culture, with the intent of either emulating it or blending it with traditional Ottoman patterns. Pasha was an example of such emulation and blending in the field of painting.

He died on May 5, 1907, of a heart attack, and is buried in Eyüp Cemetery in Istanbul.

== Selected paintings ==
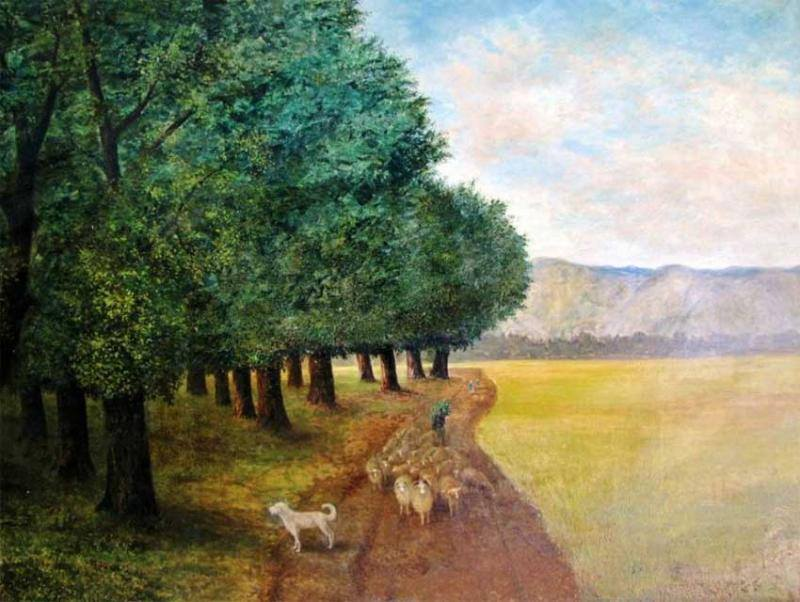
Landscape with Sheep

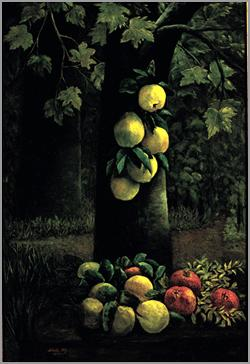
Still-life with Quinces

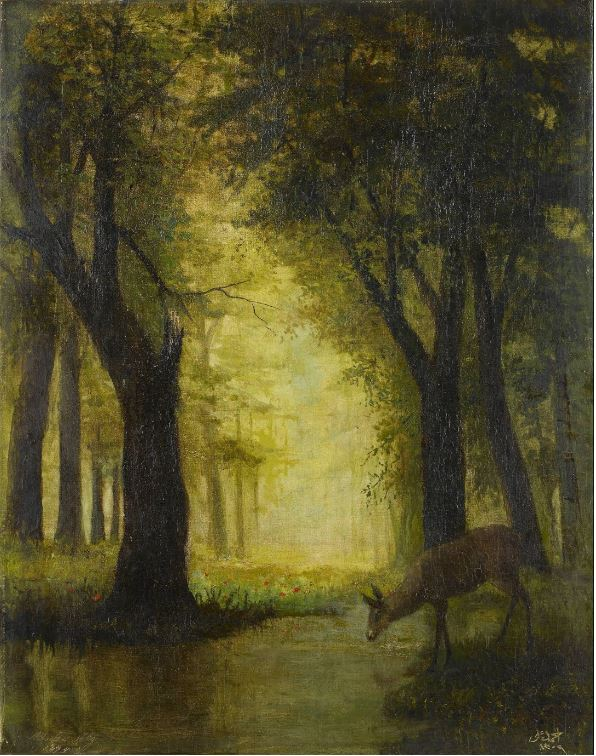
Roe in the Forest

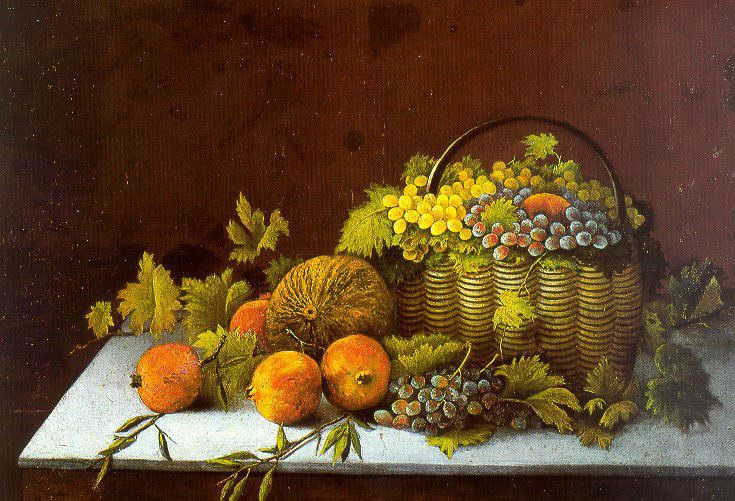
Still-life with Persimmons and Grapes
