= Bihruz Hanım =

Consort of Abdülmecid II

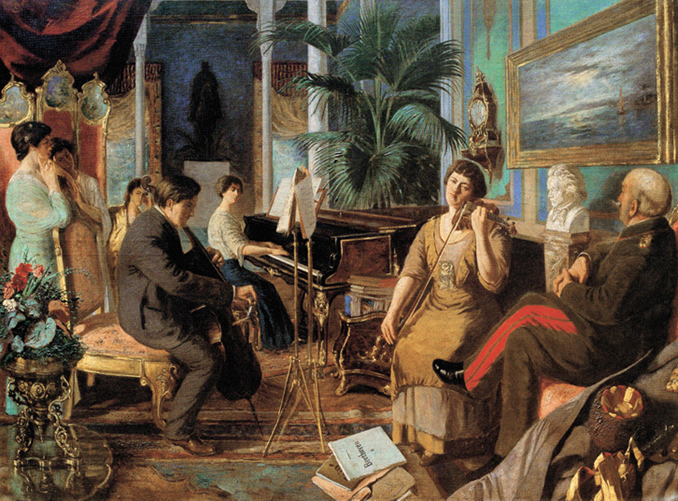
- Beethoven in the harem, painted by Abdülmecid II. Bihruz Hanım is shown playing the piano
- Born: Mihrimah Hanım; 24 May 1903; Izmit
- Died: 1955 (aged 51–52); Istanbul
- Consort: Abdülmecid II (m. 1921; died 1944)
- House: Ottoman (marriage)
- Religion: Sunni Islam

Bihruz Hanım (Ottoman Turkish: خانم بهروز, lit. 'success'; known also as Bihruz Kadın and born Mihrimah Hanım; 24 May 1903 – 1955) was the fourth and last consort of Abdülmecid II, the last Ottoman caliph.

== Biography ==
She was born as Mihrimah Hanım on 24 May 1903, in Izmit, into an unknown family.

At some point, she entered service at the Ottoman court in Istanbul, where she attracted the attention of Şehzade Abdülmecid. The two were married on 21 March 1921 at Çamlıca Palace, with Bihruz becoming his fourth and last consort. They had no children.

On 1 November 1922, the Sultanate was abolished and Mehmed VI, Abdulmecid's cousin, was deposed. However, Abdülmecid was chosen to inherit the symbolic religious title of Caliph and, consequently, moved with his family to Dolmabahçe Palace. Less than a year later, on 29 October 1923, the abolition of the caliphate was also decreed, and on 3 March 1924, the expulsion decree was issued for all members of the Ottoman dynasty, who were to leave the country within a few days. That same evening, government officials escorted Abdülmecid and his family to Çatalca station, where they were given 2,000 pounds and visas for Switzerland.

From Switzerland, in October they moved to Nice, France, where many of the dynasty's members had gathered. Abdülmecid died in 1944. Four years later, Bihruz was allowed to return to Istanbul, where she died in 1955.
