= Şehsuvar Hanım =

Consort of Ottoman Caliph Abdulmejid II

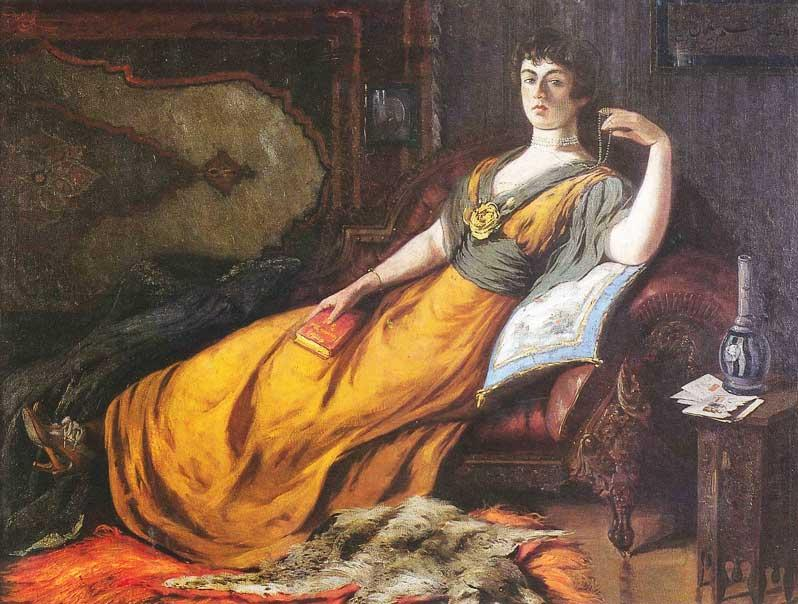
- An 1898 painting of Şehsuvar Hanım, painted by her husband Abdülmecid II
- Born: 2 May 1881
- Died: c. 1945 (aged 63–64); Paris, France
- Burial: Bobigny cemetery
- Spouse: Abdulmejid II (m. 1896; died 1944)
- Issue: Şehzade Ömer Faruk
Names
- Turkish: Şehsuvar Hanım; Ottoman Turkish: شهسوار خانم
- House: Ottoman (by marriage)
- Religion: Sunni Islam

Şehsuvar Hanım (Ottoman Turkish: شهسوار خانم; 2 May 1881 – 1945; meaning "intrepid heroine"), called also Şehsuvar Kadın, was the first consort of Abdulmejid II, the last Caliph of the Ottoman Caliphate.

== Life ==
Of Turkish and Ubykh origin, Şehsuvar Hanım was born in 1881. She married Abdulmejid, at the age of fifteen, on 22 December 1896. Şehzade Ömer Faruk, the couple's only son, was born on 29 February 1898. In 1920, Şehsuvar helped her son obtain permission from his uncle Mehmed VI to marry his daughter Sabiha Sultan, which Mehmed had initially refused. Şehsuvar spoke to Sabiha's mother, Nazikeda Kadın, and together they obtained the sultan's consent. The wedding was held on 29 April 1920.

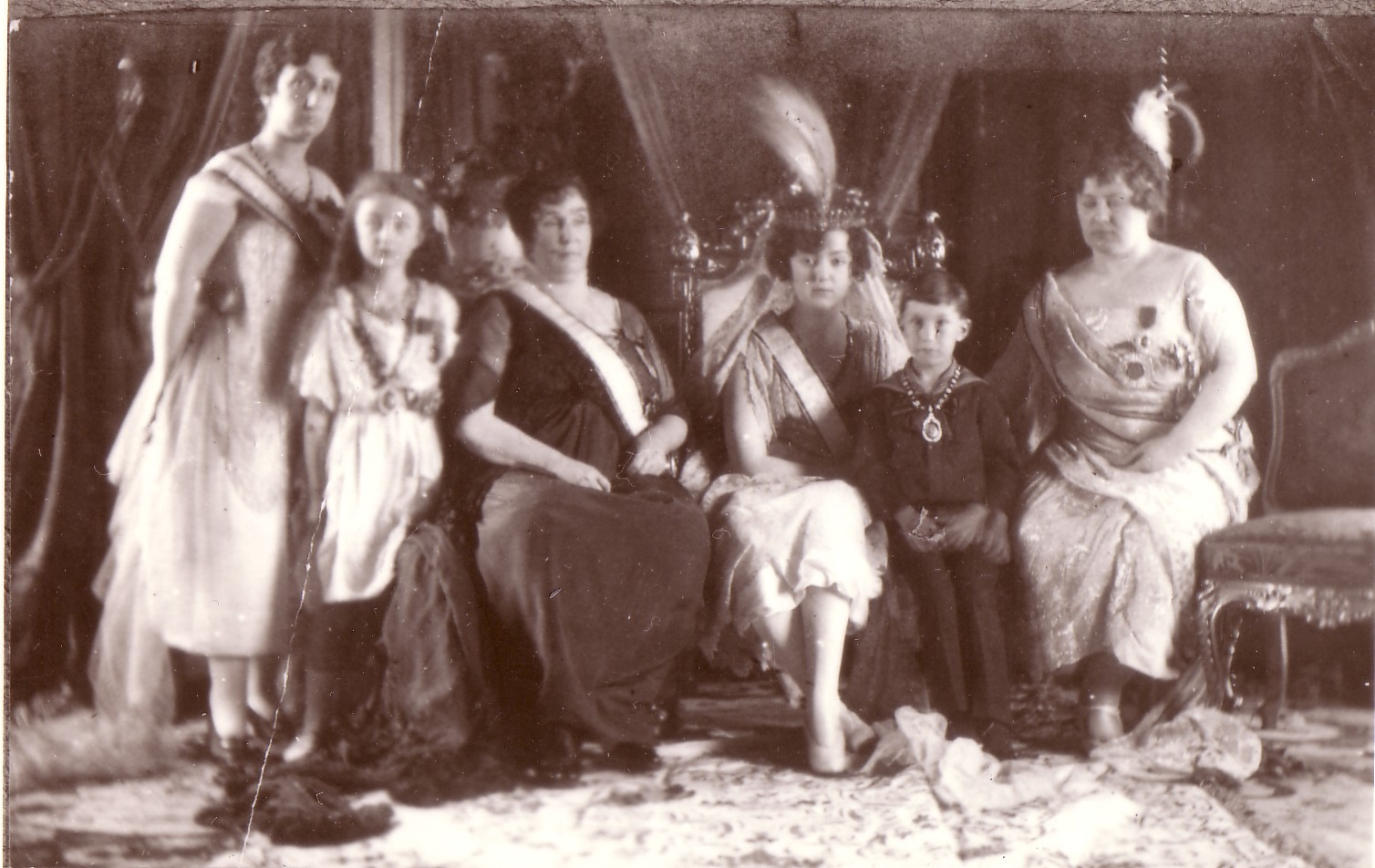
Şehsuvar (far right) at her son's wedding, 29 April 1920. The future Princess of Berar, Dürrüşehvar Sultan stands second from the left.

Abdulmejid was interested in classical music. At times, he would perform with his wives, and the kalfas. He would be at the piano, Şehsuvar and Mehisti Hanım would play the violin, and Hayrünisa Hanim the cello.

Upon the exile of the imperial family, in March 1924, she followed her husband, firstly to Switzerland and then to France where they settled in Nice. Şehsuvar had problems with the nanny of her youngest granddaughter, Necla Sultan. Indeed, Behzade Kalfa could not stand her and continually tried to instigate Necla against her. Şehsuvar could speak French, and understood English.

== In paintings ==
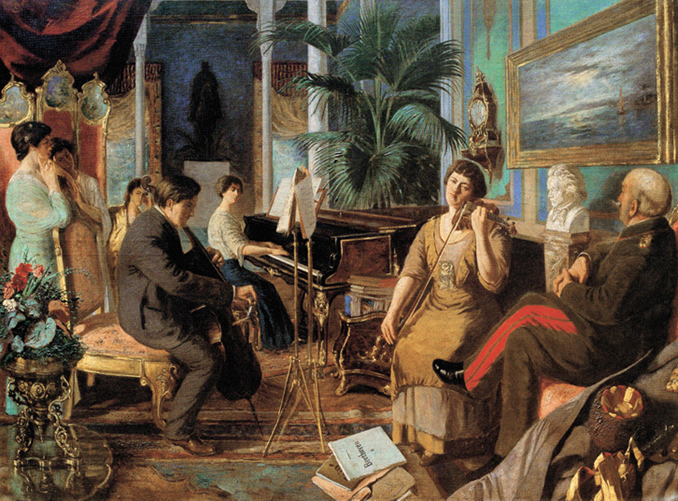
A painting by Abdulmejid depicting Şehsuvar playing violin, lady Ophelia playing piano, and his son Ömer Faruk plays cello as other two women listen with rapt attention at his summer palace in Bağlarbaşı.

In an 1898 work by Abdulmejid, Pondering/Goethe in the harem, Şehsuvar is shown reclining on a settee. However, according to an interview with Fatma Neslişah Osmanoğlu on 26 May 2002, she said that the figure does not resemble her paternal grandmother Sehsuvar Hanım. However, it must be said that Neslişah was born in 1921, almost twenty-five years after the date of the painting, and her memories of her grandmother are at least another fifteen years later. In another work of 1915, Harmony of the Harem/Beethoven in the Harem, by her husband, she is shown playing the violin.

== Death ==
She died in 1945, having outlived her husband by nearly one year, and was buried in the Muslim Bobigny cemetery in Paris.

== Issue ==
Name	Birth	Death	Notes
Şehzade Ömer Faruk	27 February 1898	28 March 1969	married twice, and had issue, three daughters

== Sources ==
- Bardakçı, Murat (2017). Neslishah: The Last Ottoman Princess. Oxford University Press. ISBN 978-9-774-16837-6.
- Sakaoğlu, Necdet (2008). Bu mülkün kadın sultanları: Vâlide sultanlar, hâtunlar, hasekiler, kadınefendiler, sultanefendiler. Oğlak Yayıncılık. ISBN 978-9-753-29623-6.
- Uçan, Lâle (2019). Son Halife Abdülmecid Efendi'nin Hayatı - Şehzâlik, Veliahtlık ve Halifelik Yılları (PDF) (PhD Thesis). Istanbul University Institute of Social Sciences.
