= Bulgurlu, Üsküdar =

Neighborhood in Istanbul, Turkey

Bulgurlu
- Neighbourhood
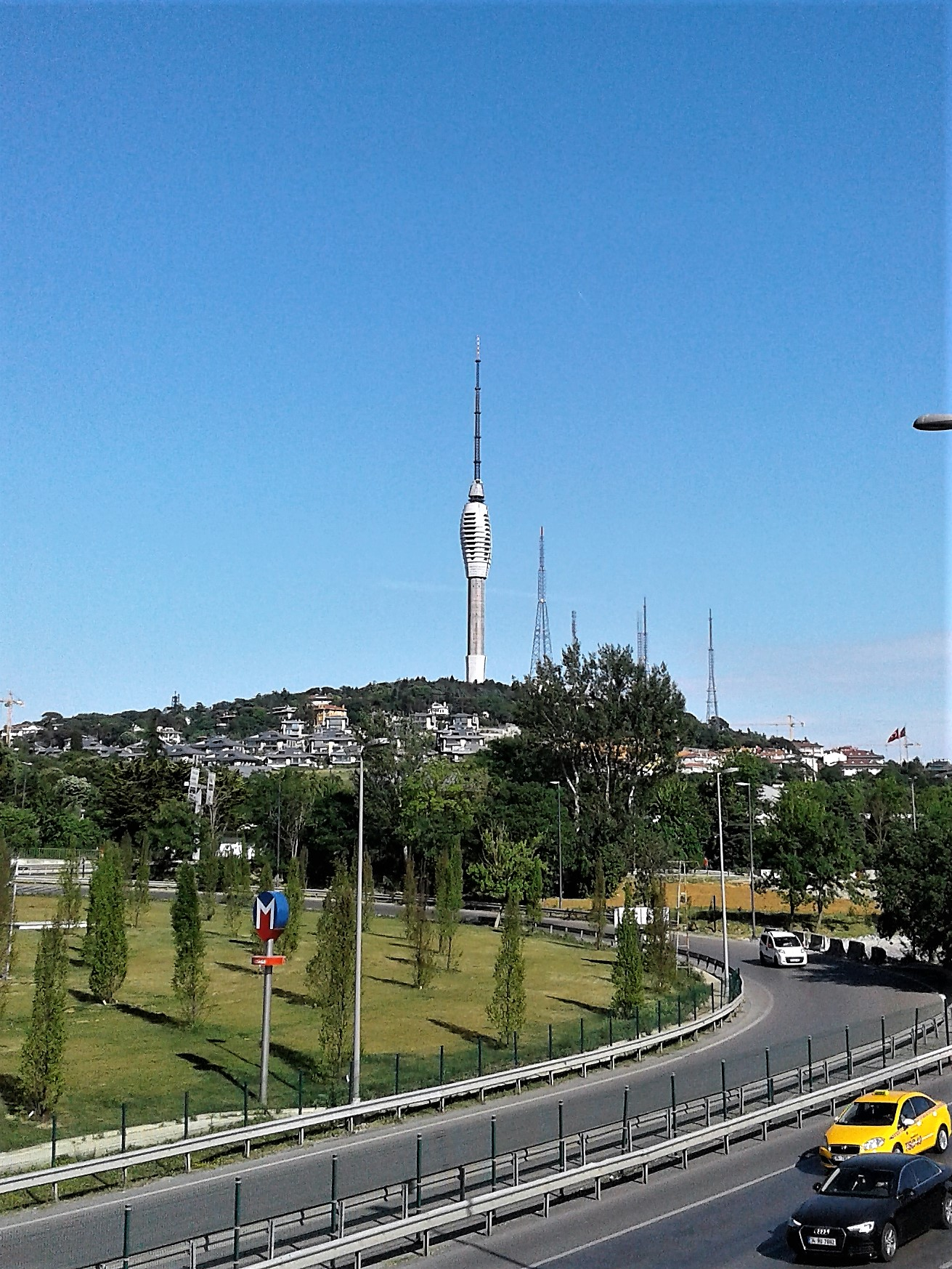
- Küçük Çamlıca Hill

- Location within Turkey Location within Istanbul
- Coordinates: 41.0167237°N 29.0768460°E
- Country: Turkey
- Province: Istanbul
- District: Üsküdar
- Population (2022): 30,569
- Time zone: UTC+3 (TRT)
- Postal code: 34696
- Area code: 0216

Bulgurlu is neighbourhood in the municipality and district of Üsküdar, Istanbul Province, Turkey. Its population is 30,569 (2022). It is on the Asian side of the Bosphorus.

Bulgurlu is one of the most populated neighborhoods of Üsküdar, and it is bordered by Küçükçamlıca Street to the west, Üçpınarlar Street to the south and the O-4 Anatolian Highway, to the east by Namık Kemal Neighborhood and to the north by Bulgurlu street. Küçük Çamlıca Hill, one of the most important recreation areas of Istanbul, is also in this neighborhood. The historical Bulgurlu Bath was established in the 17th century and still serves.

== History ==
The name of Bulgurlu, which is also mentioned as Burkullu, Burgulu, Burkurlu and Burgurlu in the sources, the claim that its name came from Bulgarian immigrants who settled in the region after April uprising of 1876 was not widely accepted.

The name of the district, which was engaged in farming in the 16th century, must have derived from bulgur. On the other hand, historians such as Reşat Ekrem Koçu claim that the real name of Küçük Çamlıca Hill is Bulgurlu Mountain and the name Küçük Çamlıca was given to the hill later.

It is believed that the name of Bulgurlu was given by the Ottomon sultan after a war that was fought here.

In Julia Pardoe's book, The Beauties of the Bosphorus, published in London in 1838, Bulgurlu's name is mentioned as Mountain of Bulgurlhu and Mount Bulgurlhu (Bulgurlu mountain, hill) and besides the two-page information about Bulgurlu. There is also a picture of Bulgurlu at that time in the book.

== Transportation ==
Bulgurlu can be reached by using public transportation from within Istanbul. There is Bulgurlu-Libadiye station on M5 line in Istanbul Metro.

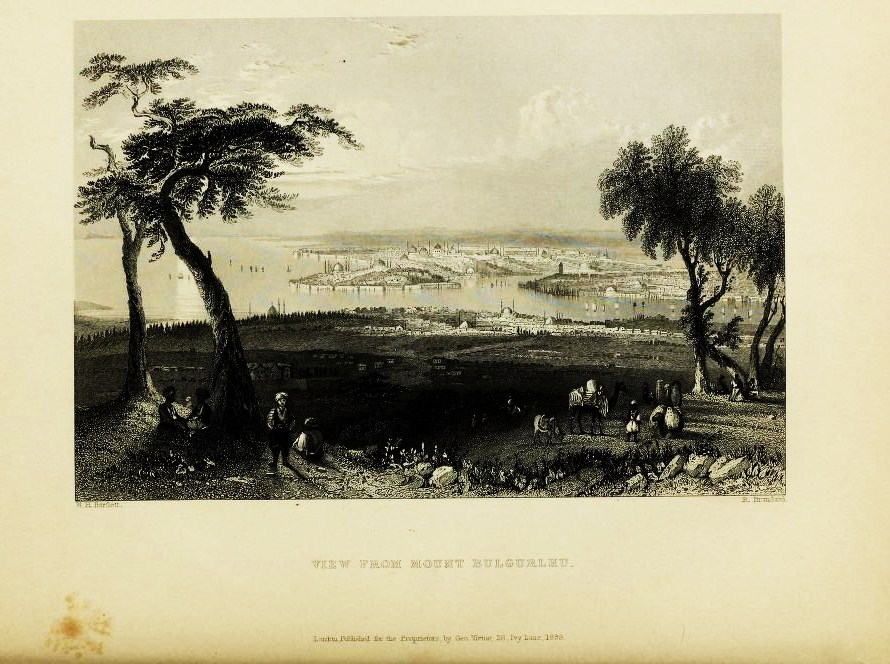
Bulgurlu, Üsküdar (From The Beauties of the Bosphorus, published in London in 1838)

== Tourist attractions ==
- Küçük Çamlıca TV Radio Tower
- Bulgurlu Bath – completed in 1618
