= Kuleli Military High School =

Coordinates: 41°03′31″N 29°03′12″E

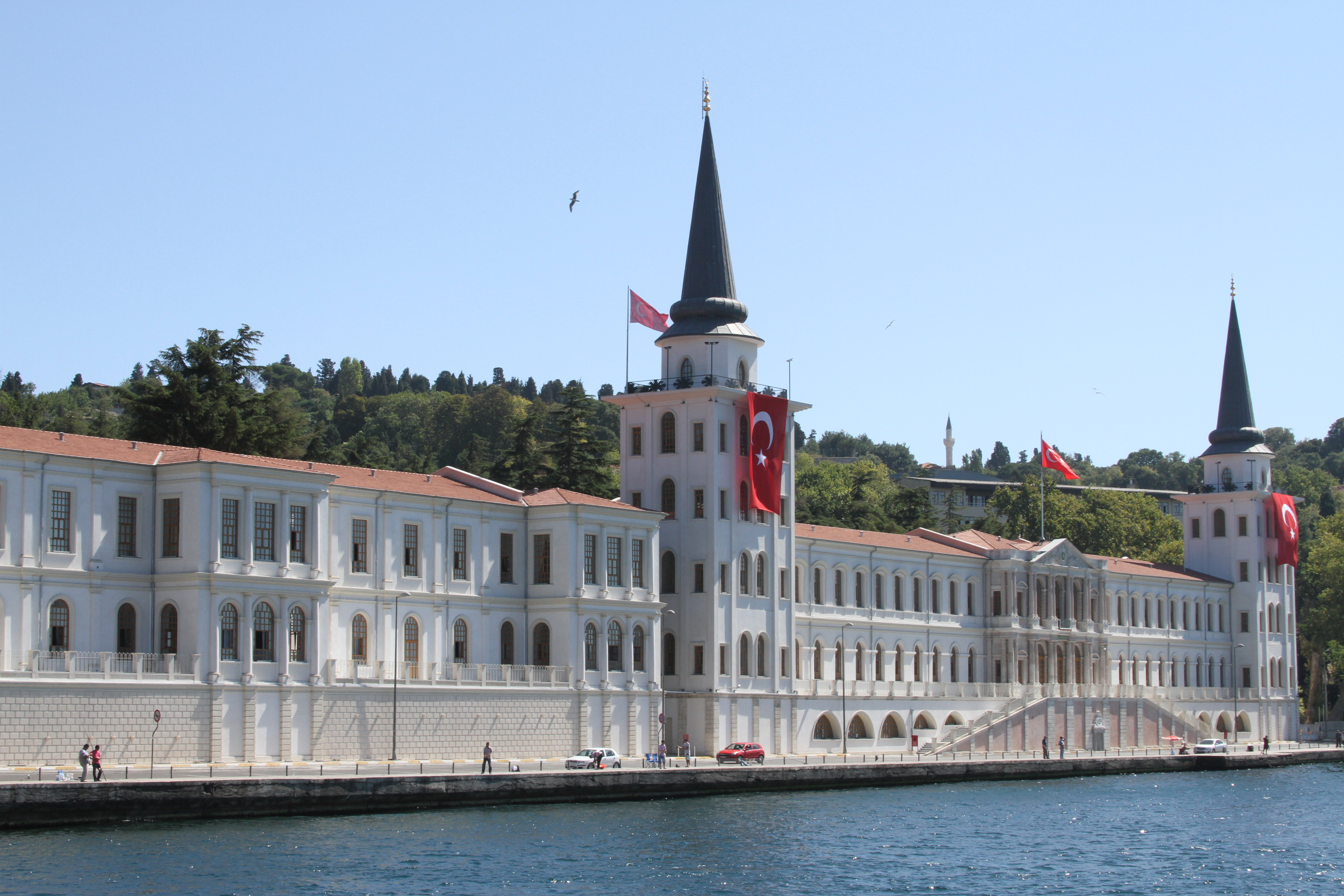
- Kuleli Military High School on the Bosphorus
- Çengelköy, Istanbul, Turkey

Information
- School type: Public, boarding
- Founded: 21 September 1845
- Closed: 31 July 2016

Kuleli Military High School was the oldest military high school in Turkey, located in Çengelköy, Istanbul, on the Asian shore of the Bosphorus strait. It was founded on 21 September 1845, by Ottoman Sultan Abdülmecid I.

After the 2016 Turkish coup d'état attempt Kuleli Military High School along with other Military High Schools was closed and turned into a museum. The building was later converted into a Language School where foreign languages were taught to military personnel.

== History ==
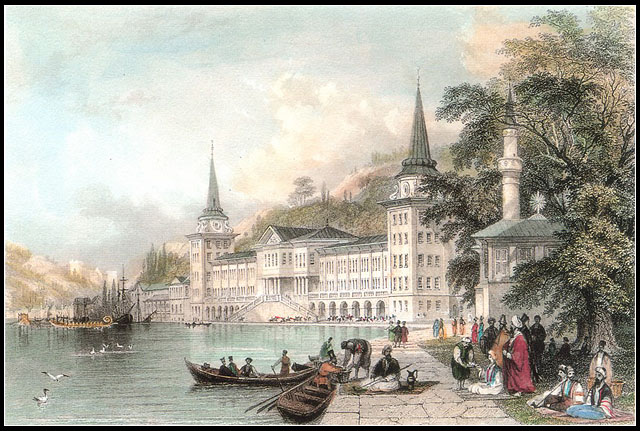
Kuleli Cavalry Barracks in 1841. Engraving by Thomas Allom, renowned for his illustrations of Ottoman era Constantinople

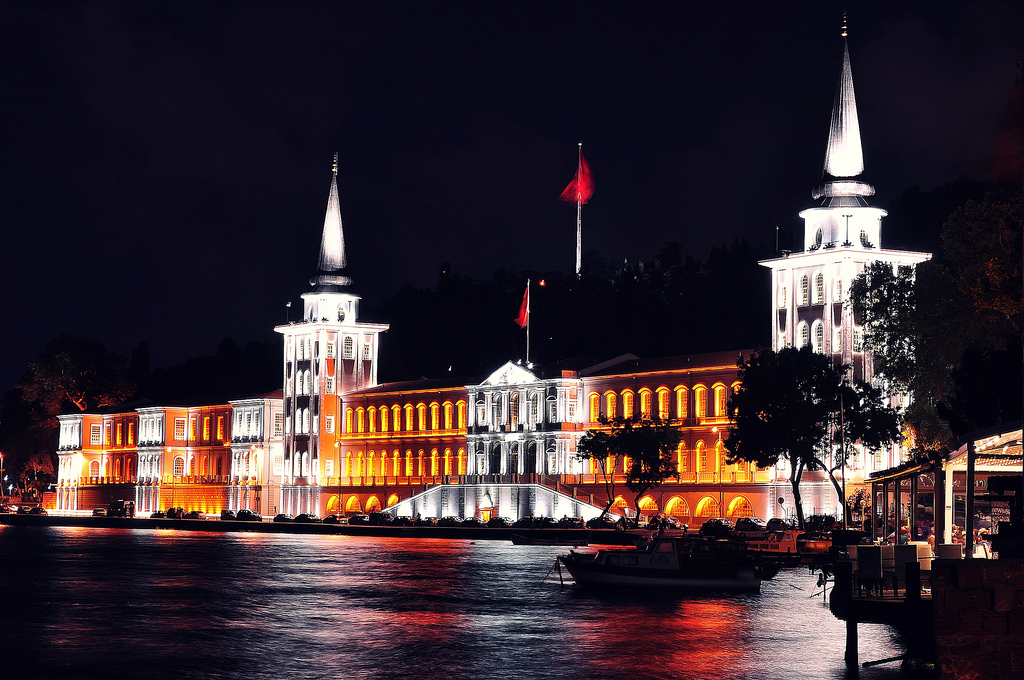
The building of the Kuleli Military High school near the Bosporus

=== Ottoman Period (1845–1923) ===
Kuleli Military High School was established on 21 September 1845, under the name of "Mekteb-i Fünun-ı İdadiye" at the Maçka Barracks in Istanbul, now used by the Istanbul Technical University. Due to the building's renewal, the school completed its first year at the Tiled Kiosk (Çinili Köşk) building, which housed the "Mızıka-i Hümayün" (Imperial Music Band) and "Zülüflü Baltacılar Ocağı" (Logistics and Communications Unit) in that period. Following the renewal of the Maçka Barracks, "Mekteb-i Fünun-ı İdadîye" started its second education year with a ceremony at the presence of Sultan Abdülmecid I on 10 October 1846.

The Kuleli Military High School building, originally the Kuleli Cavalry Barracks, was designed by Ottoman Armenian architect Garabet Balyan and its construction was completed in 1843.

In 1868, all military high schools were decided to be combined. At that time, four military high schools, including Kuleli, were combined under the name of "Umum Mekteb-i İdadî Şahane" and transferred to the Galatasaray Barracks. When the combination of military high schools turned out to be a failure, it was decided that the schools should go on their own education system separately. For this reason, “Mekteb-i Fünun-ı İdadîye” and “Deniz İdadîsi” (Naval High School) moved to the Kuleli Barracks in 1872. Afterwards, the school came to be known as the "Kuleli İdadîsi" (Kuleli Military High School).

During the Russo-Turkish War (1877–1878) between the Ottoman Empire and Russia, the school was transformed into a hospital. Therefore, the students and academic staff of Kuleli moved to the Turkish Military Academy building in Pangaltı, Istanbul. When the war ended, the school returned to its building in Çengelköy with the "Askeri Tıbbiye İdadisi" (Military Medical High School) in 1879. The hospital on the ridge outside the school was evacuated and sent to the Military Medical School, because the building had become too crowded. The hospital later moved to the Beylerbeyi quarter. The "Askeri Tıbbiye İdadisi" (Military Medical High School) was transferred to the Haydarpaşa quarter in 1910.

During the Balkan Wars in 1912–1913 (First Balkan War), Kuleli Barracks was converted into a hospital again. Some of the students were sent to the Kandilli High School for Girls (Adile Sultan Palace) and some others to the buildings next to the Beylerbeyi Palace. At the end of 1913, the school moved back to its own building. During World War I, the school temporarily moved to the Prinkipo Greek Orthodox Orphanage in Büyükada Island near Istanbul for some time. At the end of World War I, the building was abandoned due to the British request in the Armistice of Mudros and allocated as a dormitory for the Armenian orphans and refugees who were deported during World War I.

Kuleli Military High School first moved to a military camp, consisting of tents only, near Sünnet Bridge in Kağıthane, then one month later, to a police station in Maçka. Because of the British interest there, it was transferred to the old Gendarmerie School near Beylerbeyi Palace (26 December 1920).

=== Turkish Republic Period (1923–2016) ===
The Kuleli Barracks were returned to the Turkish army at the end of the Treaty of Lausanne (1923) as a result of the Turkish victory in the Turkish War of Independence (1919–1923). The British evacuated the Kuleli Barracks on 6 October 1923 after controlling it for a 3-year period.

The school became a civilian high school by the "Tevhid-i Tedrisat" bill (a law that regulated education) passed in 1924 and was renamed as "Kuleli Lisesi" (Kuleli High School). At the end of the same year, it became a military high school again. Also, it took its present name in 1925 as "Kuleli Military High School". In World War II, Kuleli was transferred to Konya in May 1941 according to the mobilization plans. Kuleli Barracks was converted into a 1,000-bed military hospital and the Bosphorus Transportation Command moved there as well.

After World War II, the school moved back to Istanbul on 18 August 1947 into its historical home. Kuleli Military High School applied the curriculum of the Ministry of National Education for science courses until the 1975–76 academic year. Afterwards, it began to apply the college system and the education period was increased from three to four years, with the addition of a Prep Class.

After the 2016 Turkish coup d'état attempt Kuleli Military High School and the other military high schools were closed on 31 July 2016 with a decree.

== Notable alumni ==
- İlker Başbuğ, 26th Chief of the General Staff of Turkey
- Hulusi Behçet, dermatologist and scientist
- Yaşar Büyükanıt, 25th Chief of the General Staff of Turkey
- Cemal Paşa, officer and mayor of Istanbul
- Abdullah Çevrim, football player
- Fazıl Hüsnü Dağlarca, poet
- Fevzi Çakmak, Turkish Field Marshal, politician
- Ragıp Gümüşpala, 11th Chief of the General Staff of Turkey
- Cemal Gürsel, fourth President of Turkey
- Remzi Aydın Jöntürk, film director, producer, actor and painter
- Musa Kâzım Karabekir, commander of the Eastern Army in the Ottoman Empire, politician
- Tahir Tamer Kumkale, writer
- Aziz Nesin, writer and humorist
- Irfan Orga, fighter pilot, diplomat, writer
- Gazi Osman Paşa, Ottoman Turkish Field Marshal
- Ibrahim Fehmi Pasha (1838—1896), Ottoman statesman
- Ömer Seyfettin, writer
- Cevdet Sunay, fifth President of Turkey
- İrfan Tansel, Commander-in-Chief of the Turkish Air Force
- İshak Sükuti, writer and medical doctor
- Cengiz Topel, fighter pilot
- Alparslan Türkeş, politician
- Tayyar Yalaz, sport wrestler
- Şerif Yenen, travel specialist, travel writer and tourist guide

== Notable faculty ==
- Ali Ferit Gören (1913-1987), Austrian-Turkish Olympic sprinter

== See also ==
- Ottoman architecture
- Education in the Ottoman Empire
