= Abidin Ünal =

Turkish general

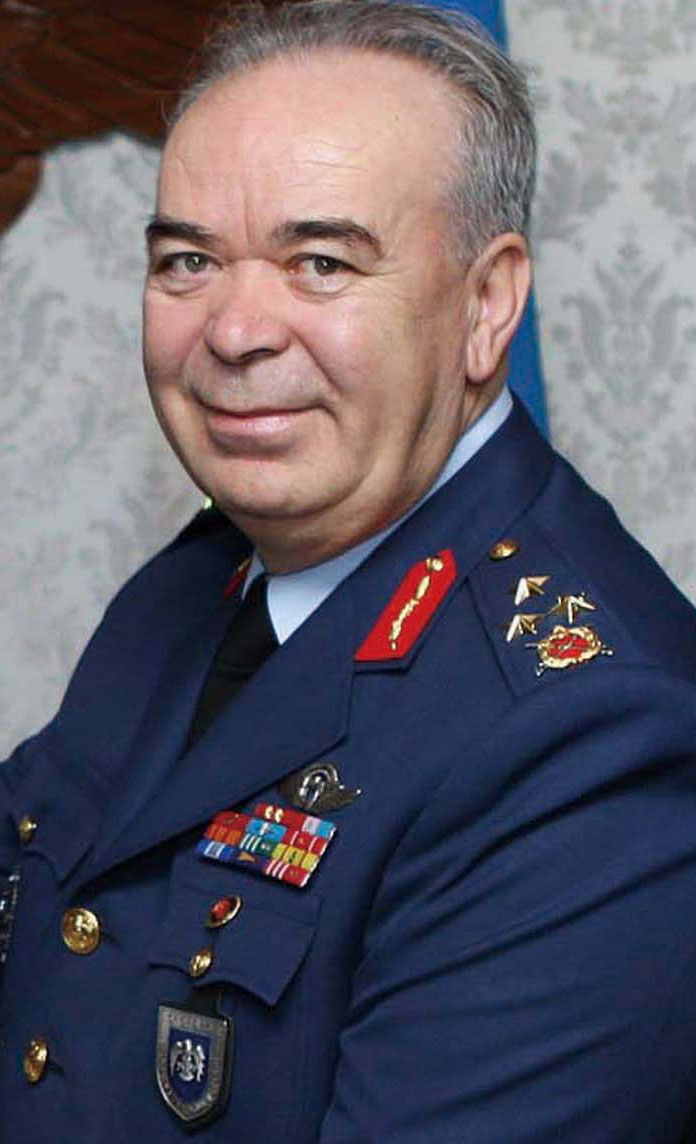
- Abidin Ünal Commander of the Turkish Air Force
- Born: January 1, 1953 (age 73); Pınarbaşı, Kayseri, Turkey
- Education: Turkish Air Force Academy; Royal Air Force College Cranwell
- Military career
- Allegiance: Turkey
- Branch: Turkish Air Force
- Service years: 1972–2017
- Rank: General
- Commands: Commander of Air Force; 1st Air Force Command; Combat Air Force and Air Missile Defense Command

Abidin Ünal (born January 1, 1953) is a retired Turkish Air Force general and commander of the Turkish Air Force. During his tenure, he was a Senior Member of the NATO Technology and Research Organization General Assembly.

== Career ==
=== Officer and staff officer ===
Ünal attended the elementary school in Kazancık as well as the middle school in Pınarbaşı and the middle school Demir-Çelik Ortaokulu in Karabük, before he completed training at the vocational school for chemical engineering (Turkish: Kimya Teknisyen Okulu) in Ankara from 1968 to 1972.

In 1972 he began his officer training at the Turkish Air Force Academy (Turkish: Hava Harp Okulu), which he completed on August 30, 1975, as a lieutenant (Turkish: Teğmen). Subsequently he was first used in the 2nd training base of the Air Force Training Command in Çiğli and then in the 3rd Air Force base in Konya, where he became a flight instructor in the 131st squadron in July 1977. In 1982 he began his training as a staff officer at the Air Force Academy (Turkish: Hava Harp Akademisi), which he finished in 1984. He then worked as an instructor in the training regiment of the Air Force School and became a pilot and instructor in an F-16 squadron in 1987, before he was commander of the flying group of the 142nd squadron, which also consisted of F-16 multi-purpose combat aircraft, at the Akıncı Air Base between 1989 and 1990 has been.

In 1990 Ünal moved to the Ministry of Defense (Turkish: Millî Savunma Bakanlığı) and became a project officer in the F-16 system management department and then found use in 1991 as an officer in the 162nd F-16 multi-purpose squadron in Bandırma. After graduating from the Royal Air Force College Cranwell from 1992 to 1993, he became the commander of the 192nd Multipurpose Squadron in Balıkesir in 1993. He then became a project officer in the Department for Disarmament and International Relations of the Department of Planning and Politics in the General Staff of Turkey in 1994 and, in 1995, military adviser to the Permanent Mission of Turkey to the Organization for Security and Cooperation in Europe (OSCE) in Vienna. September 1998 became head of the operations department of the 5th Air Force Base in Merzifon (Turkish: 5. Ana Jet Üs Komutanlığı).

=== Promotion to general ===
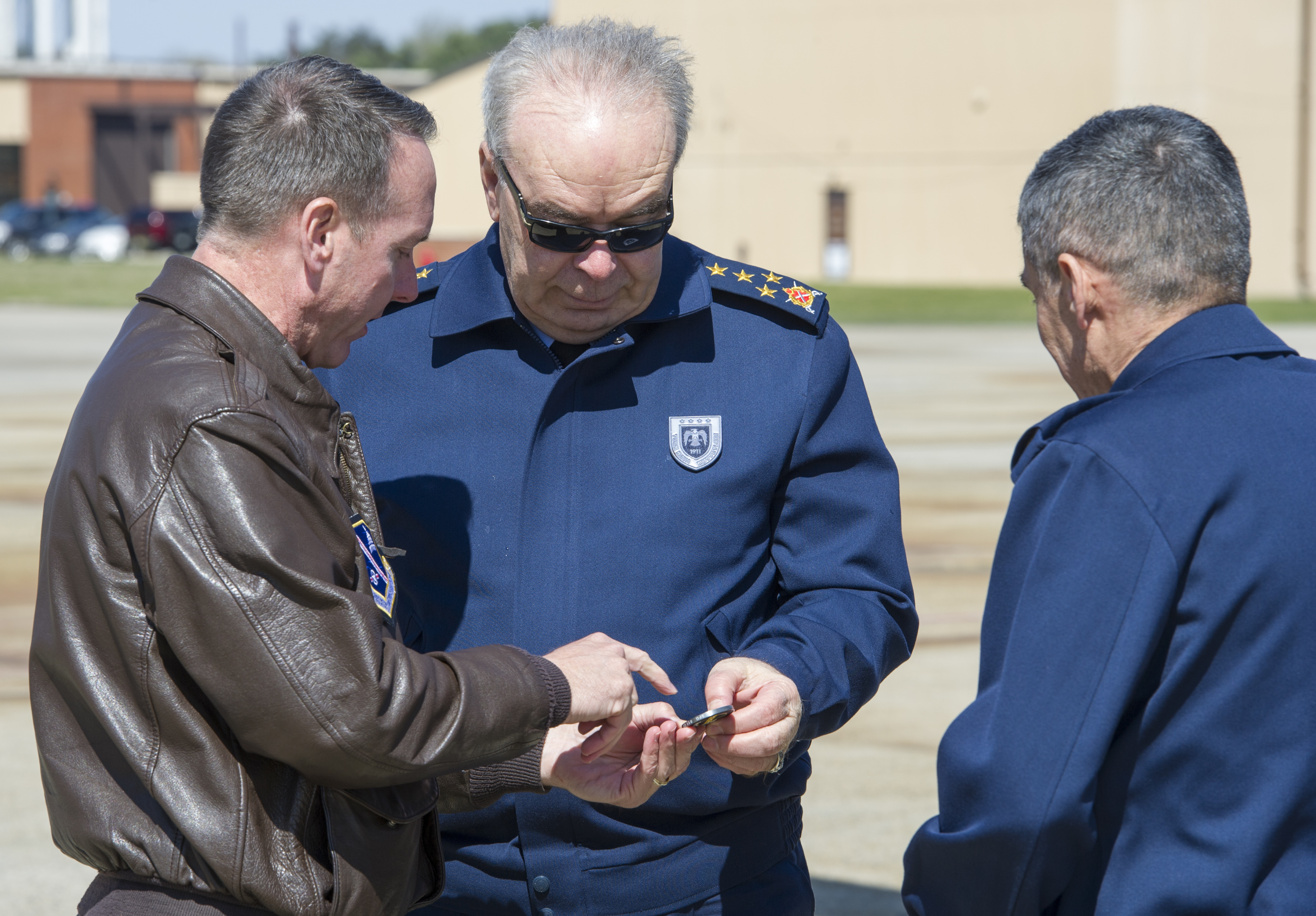
Colonel Brad Hoagland and General Abidin Ünal, 2015

On August 30, 2000 Ünal was promoted to brigadier general (Turkish: Tuğgeneral) and appointed head of the Scientific Support Center at the General Staff and a member of the General Assembly of the Research and Technology Organization of NATO. On August 3, 2002, he became commander of the 5th Air Force Base (Turkish: 5th Ana Jet Üs Komutanlığı) in Merzifon and on August 4, 2003, head of the project management department in the High Command of the Air Force.

On August 17, 2004, Ünal was appointed head of the basic planning department in the Air Force High Command and shortly thereafter, on August 30, 2004, he was promoted to major general (Turkish: Tümgeneral). He then acted from August 4, 2006, to August 12, 2008, as the commander of the Air Force School. In 2008 he was promoted to lieutenant general (co- general ) and appointed head of the department of military attachés and supervision in the general staff. He then acted from 2009 to 2011 as Chief of Staff in the High Command of the Air Force and between 2011 and 2014 as commanding general of the then 1st Tactical Air Force Command (Turkish: 1. Hava Kuvveti Komutanı) in Eskişehir.

According to the summary of the previous two Tactical Air Command in Eskişehir and Diyarbakır with the 10th Tanker Base Command (Turkish: 10. Tanker Üs Komutanlığı) on the Incirlik Air Base and the 14th command for unmanned steering body systems (Turkish: 14. İnsansız Uçak Sistemleri Ana Üs Komutanlığı) in Batman and the 15th Missile Command (Turkish: 15. Füze Üs Komutanlığı) in Alemdağ to the Air Combat and Air Missile Command (Turkish: Muharip Hava Kuvveti ve Hava Füze Savunma Komutanlığı) in Eskişehir on August 5, 2014, on August 5, 2014, Lieutenant General Ünal was de factand already its Deputy General Ünal days later after his promotion to general (Turkish: Orgeneral) on August 7, 2014, his commanding general, with no predecessor.

=== After 2015 ===
Most recently, on August 14, 2015, he succeeded General Akın Öztürk as Supreme Commander of the Air Force (Turkish: Türk Hava Kuvvetleri), while Lieutenant General Mehmet Şanver became the new Commanding General of the Air Combat and Air Missile Command. He was appointed as the commander of the Turkish Air Force with the 2015 High Military Council decisions. The Russian Su-24 aircraft, which violated the border during his command, was shot down by Turkish F-16s. After the PKK attacks that started in 2015, extensive air strikes were launched against PKK elements in Iraq. In 2016, on the evening of the military coup attempt, Ünal and other senior members of the Turkish Armed Forces, who were at the wedding of the then Combat Air Force and Air Missile Defense Commander Lieutenant General Mehmet Şanver's daughter, were taken hostage by the soldiers who carried out the coup and taken from Istanbul to the Murted Air Base. In the statement of the prosecutor; He stated that he was a plaintiff and a complainant among the participants in the coup attempt. He was retired on August 21, 2017. He handed over his duty to General Hasan Küçükakyüz.

== Personal life ==
Ünal is married and has one child.

Military offices
Preceded by Akın Öztürk	Commander of the Turkish Air Force; August 14, 2015–August 22, 2017	Succeeded by Hasan Küçükakyüz
Preceded by -	Commander of the Combat Air Force and Air Missile Defense Command; August 5, 2014–August 14, 2015	Succeeded by Mehmet Şanver
