= Murat Tekin =

Turkish Air Force Academy student who died during the 2016 Turkish coup attempt

- Born: 15 December 1994
- Died: 16 July 2016 (aged 21); Istanbul, Turkey
- Education: Turkish Air Force Academy
- Occupation: Military student

Murat Tekin (15 December 1994 – 16 July 2016) was a Turkish military student at the Turkish Air Force Academy. He was a second-year student at the academy when he died during the events of the 2016 Turkish coup d'état attempt. Tekin was among the military students transported from a summer training camp in Yalova to Istanbul on the night of 15 July 2016. He died on the Bosphorus Bridge in the early hours of 16 July.

== Early life and education ==
Murat Tekin attended Işıklar Military Air High School in Bursa before entering the Turkish Air Force Academy. He was a second-year student at the academy in 2016. According to statements by his family, he intended to become a pilot in the Turkish Air Force.

In the summer of 2016, Tekin was attending a training camp in Yalova with other students from the Turkish Air Force Academy.

== 15 July 2016 ==
On the night of 15 July 2016, a group within the Turkish Armed Forces attempted to overthrow the Turkish government. Military students from the Turkish Air Force Academy were transported from their training camp in Yalova to Istanbul. Tekin was among the students taken to the Bosphorus Bridge.

According to an account given by Tekin's sister, Mehtap Tekin, the students were told that they were being taken to an exercise. She stated that her brother had not fired on civilians and that he went toward another military student who was being attacked before he was killed.

The circumstances surrounding the deployment of the military students and the events on the bridge have been described differently in different accounts. The claims concerning Tekin's actions on the bridge are therefore generally attributed to his family and to the sources reporting their statements.

== Death ==
Murat Tekin died on the Bosphorus Bridge in Istanbul in the early hours of 16 July 2016.

Contemporary reporting on the autopsy stated that his body had extensive blunt-force injuries and wounds caused by cutting and stabbing instruments. The reported findings also included pressure to the neck and obstruction of the mouth and nose associated with asphyxia.

Tekin's family was unable to identify his body immediately. According to reports, his body was found at the Forensic Medicine Institute 12 days after the events of 15 July. His family subsequently identified him through physical characteristics.

The Tenkil Memorial database describes Tekin's death as a lynching and states that he entered the crowd after leaving his weapon behind.

== Legal proceedings ==
Following Tekin's death, his family sought an investigation into the circumstances of his killing and the identification of those responsible.

In December 2017, Deutsche Welle Türkçe reported on the family's legal campaign and its concerns regarding the effects of Decree Law 696 on the investigation of civilians involved in the events surrounding the coup attempt. The report included statements from Tekin's sister and the family's lawyer concerning their efforts to identify people whom they believed had participated in the attack on the military students.

The family stated that it intended to pursue the case before the European Court of Human Rights.

A subsequent investigation by the Istanbul Anadolu Chief Public Prosecutor's Office resulted in a decision not to prosecute. According to contemporary reporting, the decision was issued in November 2018. The family's lawyer stated that they intended to challenge the decision.

== Later claims ==
In December 2025, the Turkish website Doğru Açı published a report concerning messages allegedly sent to Mehtap Tekin through social media. According to the report, a user identified as "Yusuf Tosun" described himself as Tekin's killer and claimed to have killed a military student on the Bosphorus Bridge during the night of 15 July 2016. The report presented the messages as an alleged confession concerning Murat Tekin's death.

The same report stated that another social-media user claimed to have participated in attacks against military students on the bridge.

The claims reported in 2025 have not been established by a court in the cited source as proof of criminal responsibility for Tekin's death. They are therefore presented here as allegations rather than established findings.

== See also ==
- 2016 Turkish coup d'état attempt
- Turkish Air Force Academy
- 15 July Martyrs Bridge
