= Atilla Gülan =

Turkish Air Forces general

- Born: August 19, 1959 (age 67); Elazığ, Turkey
- Military career
- Allegiance: Turkey
- Branch: Turkish Air Force
- Service years: 1980–2023
- Rank: General
- Commands: Commander of the Air Force

Atilla Gülan (born August 19, 1959) is a retired four-star Turkish Air Forces general. He was the 33rd Commander of the Turkish Air Forces from August 4, 2022 until August 3, 2023 where he was superannuated due to his late age.

He graduated from the Turkish Air Force Academy in 1980. He was promoted to major general in 2009, lieutenant general in 2013, and full general in 2017.

Military offices
| Preceded by Hasan Küçükakyüz | Commander of the Turkish Air Force; 2022–2023 | Succeeded by Ziya Cemal Kadıoğlu |
