= Mehmet Erten =

Turkish former military general

- Born: 13 November 1948 (age 77); Bodrum, Turkey
- Military career
- Allegiance: Turkey
- Branch: Turkish Air Force
- Service years: 1970 - 2013
- Rank: General
- Commands: Commander of the Turkish Air Force

Mehmet Erten (born 13 November 1948) is a Turkish former military general who served as the 29th Commander of the Turkish Air Force from 2011 until 2013.

== Biography ==
Mehmet Erten was born in 1948 in Bodrum. He graduated from Işıklar Air Military High School in 1966 and Turkish Air Force Academy in 1968. After completing his flight training at the 2nd MJB Flight Training School and 3rd MJB, he was assigned as F-5 pilot to 143rd (later named as 152nd) squadron at the 5th MJB in 1970.

Erten participated in Cyprus Peace Operation in 1974 and was assigned as F-104S pilot at the 4th MJB 142nd Squadron between 1975 and 1979. After his graduation from Air War College in 1981, he served as operations officer at the 4th and 9th Main Jet Bases and as staff officer in Air Force Headquarters Personnel Department.

After completing his education in US Air Command and Staff College (ACSC) and Academic Instructor School (AIS) between 1988 and 1989, he was again assigned to TURAF Headquarters Personnel Department as Head of Personnel Management Section for two years. General Erten served in NATO between 1991 and 1994 in NATO AEW&C Program Management Agency (NAPMA).

After three years of service in NATO, he was commissioned as Chief of Inspection and then as Chief of Operations at the 12th Air Transportation Main Base until 1997 and assigned to Turkish General Staff Logictics Department as Head of Plans Branch. After his promotion to brigadier general in 1999, he served as Chief of Plans and Programs Department in Air Force HQ for two years and as the Commander of 12th Air Transportation Main Base until 2003.

In 2003 he was promoted to major general and assigned as Chief of Staff, Air Logictics Command for three years. In 2006 he became the Commander of 2nd Air Supply and Maintenance Center. In 2007, he was promoted to lieutenant general and served as Chief of Logistics Department, TGS for two years and became the Commander, Air Logistics Command until 2011. As of 4 August 2011, Lt. Gen. Erten assumed the duty as the Turkish Air Force Commander and was promoted to the rank of general on 30 August 2011.

In August 2013, Mehmet Erten was succeeded by General Akın Öztürk as the Turkish Air Force Commander.

Erten is married to Munevver Erten and has one daughter. He speaks English.

Military offices
Preceded by Hasan Aksay	Commander of the Turkish Air Force; August 30, 2011-August 22, 2013	Succeeded by Akın Öztürk
