= Starnet =

Starnet may refer to:

- Star network, a datacomm networking topology
- STAR (interbank network), a banking communication network
- StarNet, a Moldovan ISP
- STARNET, the NATO Science, Technology and Research Network
- starNet, a wireless network in Hobart, Tasmania, part of TasWireless
- STARNet, the United Airlines nickname for Star Alliance airline alliance network

== See also ==
- NetStar Communications
- Starlink (disambiguation)
