= Akın Öztürk =

Turkish Air Force general

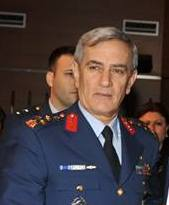
- General Akın Öztürk, TAF; 30th Commander of the Turkish Air Force
- Born: February 21, 1952 (age 74); Gümüşhane, Turkey
- Military career
- Allegiance: Turkey
- Branch: Turkish Air Force
- Service years: 1973–2016
- Rank: General (Dismissed in 2016)
- Commands: Commander of Air Force; Intelligence Chief of Air Force; 2nd Air Supply and Maintenance Command; Training and Projects Command; 141st Squadron Command; MJB Operations Command
- Awards: See below

Akın Öztürk (born February 21, 1952) is a former four-star general in the Turkish Air Force who served as the 30th Commander of the Turkish Air Force until August 4, 2015. After his expiration as commander, he continued his duty as a member of the Supreme Military Council.

Öztürk was arrested on 16 July 2016 on charges of having played a leading role in the failed 2016 Turkish coup attempt of 15 July. He was stripped of all his military ranks and indicted for offences against public order, terrorism, conspiracy and treason. Öztürk has denied the charges.

On June 20, 2019, Öztürk was sentenced to life in prison. During his interrogation, it is alleged that he was tortured in unofficial police locations.

== Military career ==
Upon graduating from the 2nd Main Jet Base (MJB) Flight Training School as a fighter pilot in 1975, he was assigned to the 7th MJB in Malatya where he served as an F-100 and F-4 pilot until 1981. In 1981, he was assigned to the 1st MJB in Eskişehir where he served as Squadron Officer and Standardization and Evaluation Branch Chief.

In 1987, he was assigned to the 3rd MJB as Standardization and Evaluation Officer. His next assignment was in 1989 in the 4th MJB where he became an F-16 pilot. There, he served as 141st Squadron Operations Officer between 1989 and 1991. Starting in May 1991, Öztürk was the commander of the 141st Squadron until 1993. Between 1993 and 1996 he served as Project Officer and Branch Chief in Training Department at Turkish Air Headquarters. He was the Turkish Military attache to Israel between 1996 and 1998. He then became the Operations Commander of the 6th MJB, Bandırma between 1998 and 2000. After his promotion to brigadier general in 2000, he served as Chief of Training Department in Air Force Headquarters for two years and as the Commander of 9th MJB until 2004.

As of 2004 he was promoted to major general and assigned as Commander of the 2nd Air Supply and Maintenance Center for two years. In 2006 he assumed the command of the 2nd MJB. In 2008, he became the Chief of Intelligence of the Turkish Air Force.

In 2009, he was promoted to lieutenant general and served as the 2nd Air Force Commander for two years. He then became the Commander of the Air Training Command in 2011. General Öztürk promoted to the rank of general on 22 August 2013, and was assigned as the 30th Commander of the Turkish Air Force on 30 August 2013.

General Öztürk logged 5,800 flight hours in 30 different aircraft types during his 43-year flight career.

== Education ==
1968 High school, Erzincan
1973 Turkish Air Force Academy, Istanbul
1975 2nd Main Jet Base (MJB) Flight Training School, Çiğli
1985 Turkish Air War College, Istanbul
1988 4th Main Jet Base (MJB) Flight Training School, Akıncı, Ankara
1990 141st Squadron Training Facility
1998 6th Main Jet Base (MJB) Flight Training School
2000 National Security Studies Program
2002 General Commander Program

== 2016 Turkish coup attempt ==
Akin Öztürk was among the 2,839 military officials arrested on 16 July 2016 as part of a large Turkish government crackdown on individuals possibly responsible for the 2016 Turkish coup d'état attempt on 15 July 2016. Hürriyet newspaper reports that he was accused of being the leader of the coup attempt. Although the semi-official news agency Anadolu stated, initially, that Öztürk confessed to a prosecutor that his intention was to execute a coup, this news later disappeared, and according to the private broadcaster NTV, Öztürk denied any involvement with the coup plotters. In his statement to the prosecutor, he claimed that he happened to be on the airbase visiting his grandchildren (his son-in-law is a pilot stationed there) and, having learned of the coup attempt, successfully dissuaded the plotters from continuing with their plans and personally rescued two senior, loyal officers who were being held at the base.

In 2025 the UN Working Group on Arbitrary Detention demanded his release after Öztürk was denied fair trial.

== Awards and decorations ==
General Öztürk was awarded with NATO Medal, Turkish Armed Forces Distinguished Service Medal, Turkish Armed Forces Medal of Honor and Pakistan Nishan-e-Imtiaz Medal.

== Effective dates of promotion ==
Promotions
| Rank | Date |
|---|---|
| Dismissed with disgrace | 15 July 2016 |
| General | 30 August 2013 |
| Lieutenant General | 30 August 2009 |
| Major General | 30 August 2004 |
| Brigadier General | 30 August 2000 |
| Colonel | 30 August 1994 |
| Lieutenant Colonel | 30 August 1991 |
| Major | 30 August 1986 |
| Captain | 30 August 1982 |
| First Lieutenant | 30 August 1976 |
| Second Lieutenant | 30 August 1973 |

Military offices
| Preceded by Mehmet Erten | Commander of the Turkish Air Force; 2013–2015 | Succeeded by Abidin Ünal |
