= Turkish Band NCO Higher Vocational School =

Music school of the Turkish Armed Forces

The Band Non-Commissioned Officer Higher Vocational School (Turkish: Bando Astsubay Meslek Yüksekokulu) is a boarding military education institution that trains non-commissioned officers for military bands in the Turkish Land Forces, Naval, Air Forces as well as the Gendarmerie General Command. The school accepts foreign military students to be trained from allied and contracted countries.

== History ==
During the Ottoman period under Sultan Mahmud II, a westernization of music took place, which began in 1826 under the leadership of Mahmud. The "Musik-i Humayun" was founded as the first band school. In 1924, President Mustafa Kemal Atatürk requested the band school be moved to Ankara. The band school has continued its activities under various names in the Ankara campus since 1924. The Military Music Preparation Secondary School, which was opened on September 1, 1939, had its first graduates in 1943. After five years of primary education, three years of secondary education was completed in this school. Young graduates who completed the training process were assigned to various bands as petty officer sergeants. Subsequently, this school was named the "Military Harmony Petty Officer Preparation Secondary School" in 1952. Since 2016, the school, whose high school section was closed, has continued its activities within the body of the National Defense University. Today, there are a total of 40 bands in the Turkish Armed Forces, 23 of which are in the Land Forces, 8 in the Naval Forces, 5 in the Air Force, and 4 in the Gendarmerie General Command.

After the 15 July coup attempt in 2016, the school could not graduate between 2016 and 2018.

== School commanders ==
#	Commander	Start date	End date	Notlar
1	Hasan Hoşoğlu	30 August 2012	30 August 2014	
2	Halil Birer	30 August 2014	27 July 2016	Dismissed and arrested after the 2016 Turkish coup d'état attempt.
3	Mustafa Karaman	27 July 2016	-	

== See also ==
- Canadian Forces School of Music
