= Incirlik Air Base =

Turkish-American Air Force base near Incirlik, Turkey

- İncirlik Hava Üssü
- İncirlik, Adana in Turkey
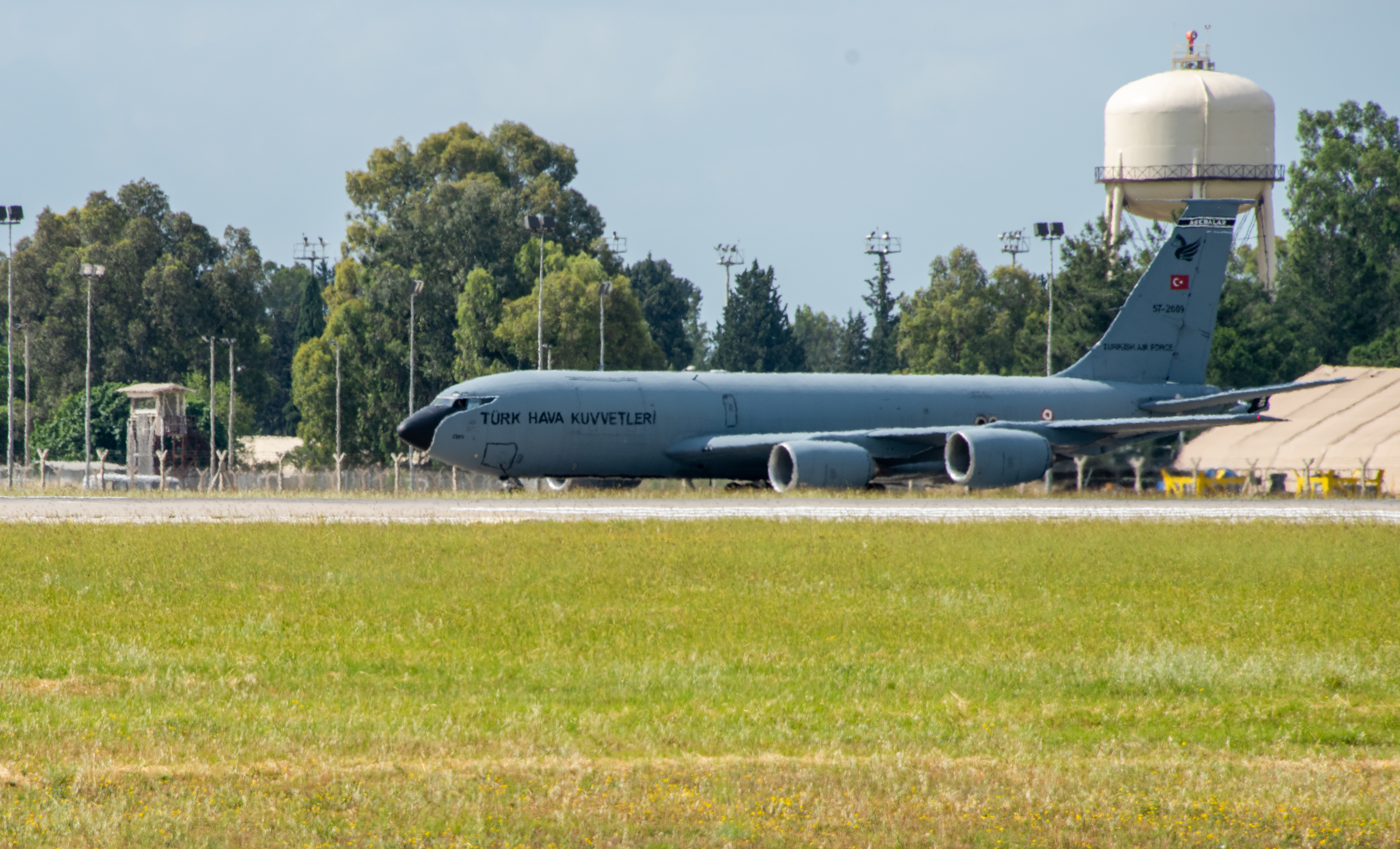
- A Turkish Air Force KC-135 Stratotanker of the 10th Tanker Base seen at Incirlik AB during 2020

Site information
- Type: Joint Turkish/United States airbase
- Owner: Ministry of National Defense
- Operator: Turkish Air Force (TurAF); US Air Force (USAF)
- Controlled by: US Air Forces in Europe – Air Forces Africa; Combatant Air Force Command (TurAF)
- Condition: Operational
- Website: Official website (USAF)

Location
- Location in Turkey Incirlik AB (NATO)
- Coordinates: 37°00′07″N 035°25′33″E

Site history
- Built: 1951 – 1955
- Built by: US Army Corps of Engineers
- In use: 1955 – present

Garrison information
- Garrison: 10th Main Jet Base Command (TurAF); 39th Air Base Wing (USAF)

Airfield information
- Identifiers: IATA: UAB, ICAO: LTAG, WMO: 173500
- Elevation: 232 feet (71 m) AMSL
Runways
Direction	Length and surface
05/23	10,000 feet (3,048 m) Concrete
- Source: Incirlik Air Base Instruction 13-204

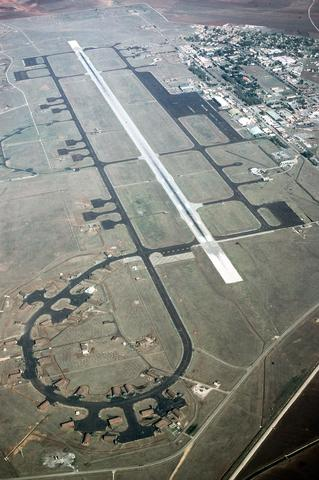
An aerial view of the airfield at Incirlik Air Base, c. 1987

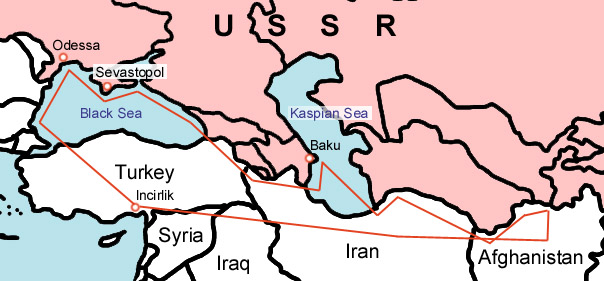
Composite Recon Track requiring two missions

Incirlik Air Base (Turkish: İncirlik Hava Üssü) (IATA: UAB, ICAO: LTAG) is a Turkish air base of slightly more than 3320 ac (1335 ha), located in the İncirlik quarter of the city of Adana, Turkey. The base is within an urban area of 1.7 million people, 10 km (6 mi) east of the city core, and 32 km (20 mi) inland from the Mediterranean Sea. The United States Air Force and the Turkish Air Force are the primary users of the air base, although it is at times also used by the Royal Air Force and the Royal Saudi Air Force. The base is also the home of the 73rd Anti-aircraft Artillery Regiment (Patriot unit) of the Spanish Army.

Incirlik Air Base is the home of the 10th Main Jet Base (Ana Jet Üssü or AJÜ) of the Combatant Air Force Command (Muharip Hava Kuvveti Komutanlığı) of the Turkish Air Force (Türk Hava Kuvvetleri). The base with all of its facilities is owned by the Turkish Air Force.

Incirlik Air Base has a U.S. Air Force (USAF) complement of about five thousand airmen, with several hundred airmen from the Royal Air Force and Turkish Air Force also present, as of late 2002. The primary unit stationed at Incirlik Air Base is the 39th Air Base Wing (39 ABW) of the U.S. Air Force. Incirlik Air Base has one 3,048 m (10,000 ft)-long runway, located among about 57 hardened aircraft shelters. Tactical nuclear weapons are stored at the base. Among them are "up to" 50 B61 nuclear bombs.

== Etymology ==
The word incirlik (pronounced [indʒiɾlic]) means "fig tree grove", in the Turkish language.

== History ==
The decision to build the Incirlik Air Base was made during the Second Cairo Conference in December 1943, but construction only began after the end of the Second World War. The U.S. Army Corps of Engineers began the work in the spring of 1951. The U.S. Air Force initially planned to use the base as an emergency staging and recovery site for medium and heavy bombers. The Turkish General Staff and the U.S. Air Force signed a joint-use agreement for the new Air Base in December 1954. On 21 February 1955, the Air Base was officially named Adana Air Base, with the 7216th Air Base Squadron as the host unit. This Air Base was renamed the Incirlik Air Base on 28 February 1958.

=== Reconnaissance missions from Incirlik ===
The early years of its existence proved the value of the presence of the Incirlik Air Base in Turkey, not only in countering the threat of the Soviet Union during the Cold War, but also in responding to crises in the Middle East, such as in Lebanon and Israel.

Project 119L, a public U.S. Air Force weather balloon launching program served as a cover story (disinformation) for the true objective of the Incirlik Air Base: to mount strategic reconnaissance missions over the Soviet Union. Under the codename "GENETRIX", these balloon launches were carried out beginning in February 1956.

Following initial weather balloon operations, pilots began flying American Lockheed U-2 aircraft reconnaissance missions as part of "Operation Overflight" by late 1957. These included nonstop flights back and forth between Incirlik and the NATO Air Base at the Norwegian town of Bodø starting in 1958. In addition, U.S. Air Force Boeing RB-47H Stratojets and U.S. Navy P4M-1Q Mercator and A3D-1Q Skywarrior reconnaissance flights operated from Incirlik into Soviet-claimed air space over the Black Sea and the Caspian Sea, and as far east as Afghanistan.

The Incirlik Air Base was the main U-2 flight base in this entire region beginning in 1956. This lasted until 1 May 1960, when a volley of about 14 Soviet SA-2 surface-to-air missiles shot down the U-2 aircraft flown by the American CIA pilot Francis Gary Powers near Sverdlovsk, Russia, a test site in the Soviet Union's Intercontinental Ballistic Missile (ICBM) program.

In addition to the Cold War aerial reconnaissance mission, Incirlik acted as an operational and logistics hub for an array of communications transmission and signals intelligence detachments located at various mountain sites, the latter focused on Soviet and Warsaw Pact forces near Turkey's borders.

=== Lebanon crisis ===
The Lebanon crisis of 1958 arose during the summer of 1958, prompting the President Dwight D. Eisenhower of the United States to order the U.S. Air Force Tactical Air Command "Composite Air Strike Force Bravo" (several squadrons) to fly immediately from the United States to Incirlik. This Composite Air Strike Force consisted of F-100 Super Sabres, B-57 Canberras, RF-101 Voodoos, B-66 Destroyers, along with the supporting WB-66 weather planes. These aircraft and their supporting airmen overwhelmed the facilities of the Incirlik Air Base – which were also supporting air transport planes that carried a U.S. Army infantry battalion from Germany to Lebanon. In the event, the U.S. Army and the U.S. Marine Corps were not involved in ground fighting. The U.S. Air Force warplanes flew non-combat missions to cover allied troop movements, to carry out a show-of-force flights over Lebanon, including over Beirut, aerial reconnaissance flights, and true news and propaganda leaflet drops on Lebanon.

As a part of an effort to bring units with combat experience into the region of Turkey, the U.S. Air Forces in Europe (USAFE) inactivated the 7216th Air Base Squadron, which had been promoted to an Air Base Group, and activated the 39th Tactical Group in its place at Incirlik on 1 April 1966. This Air Base Group assumed control of the permanent Air Force support units there, and it hosted the rotational Air Force squadrons that conducted training operations, and also maintained a NATO deterrent air force at the Incirlik Air Base.

=== As a training site ===
After the Lebanon crisis, the Tactical Air Command deployed F-100 fighter squadrons on 100-day rotations to Incirlik from the United States. The flying mission at Incirlik further diversified in 1970 when the Turkish Air Force agreed to allow the U.S. Air Forces in Europe to use its air-to-ground missile testing range at 240 km northwest Konya, providing a suitable training area for the warplane squadrons deployed to Incirlik. These units also conducted training at Incirlik's offshore air-to-air missile range over the Mediterranean Sea.

Throughout the 1970s and 1980s, except during the Cyprus dispute, many types of U.S. Air Force warplanes, including F-4 Phantom IIs, F-15 Eagles, F-16 Fighting Falcons, F-111 Aardvarks, A-10 Thunderbolt IIs, and the C-130 Hercules completed temporary duty rotations at Incirlik, not least in support of the base's NATO/USAFE forward-deployed nuclear mission.

=== Embargo ===
In mid-1975, the Turkish government announced that all U.S. military bases in Turkey would be closed and transferred to the Turkish Air Force. This action was in response to an arms embargo that the United States Congress imposed on Turkey for using American-supplied equipment during the Turkish invasion of Cyprus in 1974. Only Incirlik Air Base and İzmir Air Base remained open due to their NATO responsibilities, but all non-NATO activities at these locations were suspended.

After Congress lifted the embargo in September 1978, and also restored military and naval assistance to Turkey, normal operations resumed in Turkey, and the United States and Turkey signed the Defense and Economic Cooperation Agreement (DECA) on 29 March 1980. After signing the DECA, the USAFE initiated the "Turkey Catch-up Plan" to improve the quality-of-life of airmen stationed at Incirlik. One of the major projects was a completely new base housing complex for airmen and officers.

=== First Gulf War, Humanitarian Relief, and Operation Northern Watch ===
After Iraq's 1990 invasion of neighboring Kuwait, the 7440th Composite Wing (Provisional) assumed operational control of the 39th Tactical Group. The 7440th was the air component of Joint Task Force Proven Force, which eventually controlled 140 aircraft and opened a northern front, forcing Iraq to split its defenses between the north and the south, where the main thrust of coalition attacks originated as part of Operation Desert Storm. Following the war, Incirlik hosted Combined Task Force Provide Comfort, which oversaw Operation Provide Comfort (OPC), the effort to provide humanitarian relief to millions of Kurdish refugees in northern Iraq.

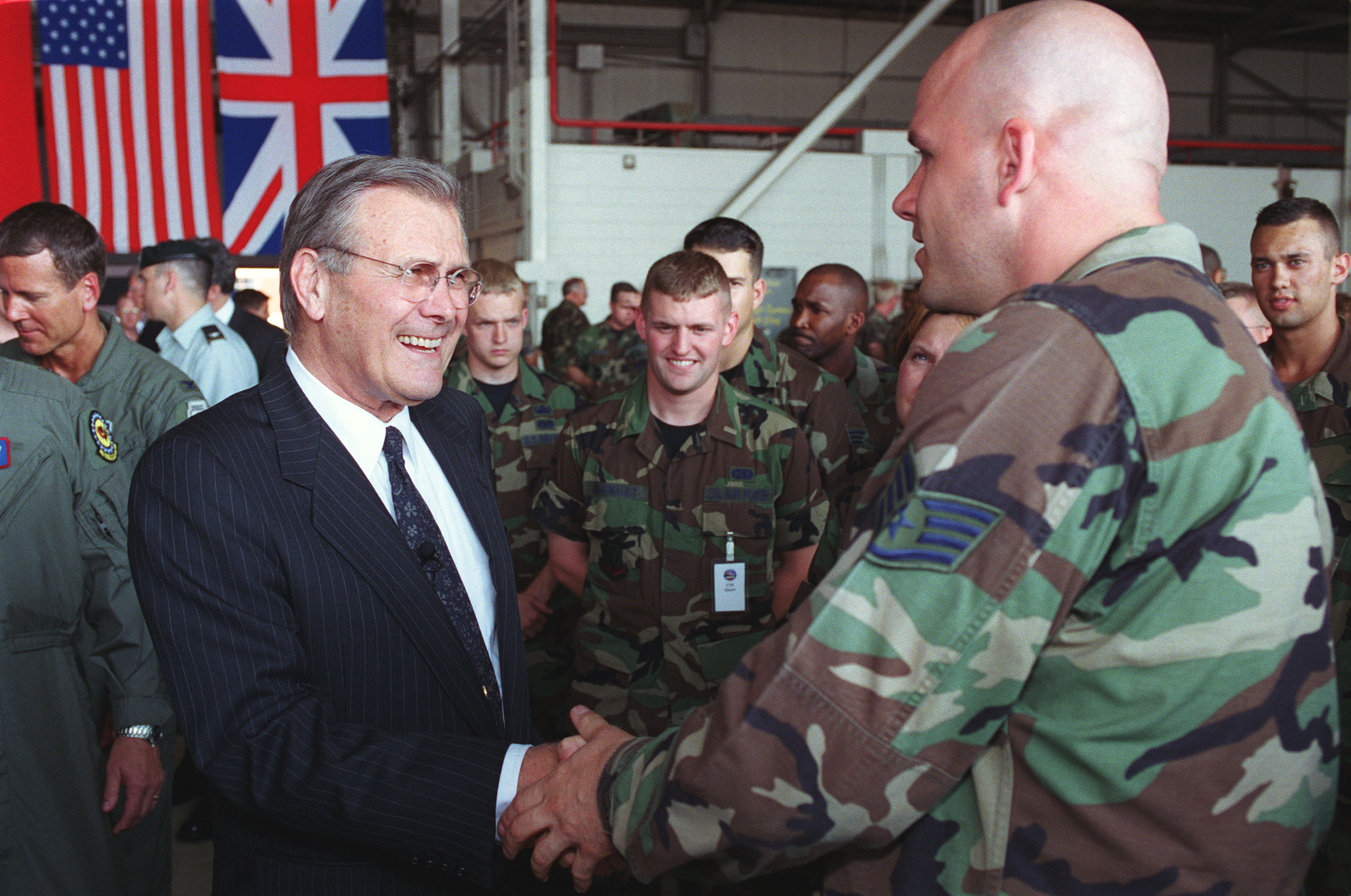
Secretary of Defense Donald Rumsfeld during his visit to Incirlik Air Base, 4 June 2001

Between 1992 and 1997 Vickers VC10s from No. 101 Squadron RAF were based here for Operation Warden over Iraq.

The 39th TACG was redesignated the 39th Wing on 1 October 1993 and restructured as a standard Air Force objective wing.

The U.S. State Department's "Operation Quick Transit" evacuated thousands of Kurds from northern Iraq late in 1996. The wing provided logistical support in Turkey to this operation, which signaled the end of the humanitarian aspect of Operation Provide Comfort (OPC). OPC ended 31 December 1996, and Operation Northern Watch (ONW) took its place 1 January 1997 with the task to enforce the U.N.-sanctioned no-fly zone north of the 36th parallel in Iraq.

The 39th Air and Space Expeditionary Wing was activated at Incirlik AB on 15 September 1997, to support and command USAF assets deployed to Incirlik supporting ONW, while Incirlik's tent city, Hodja Village, became the USAF's largest such "temporary" facility.

From 1994, the Turkish Air Force began receiving KC-135R-CRAG Stratotanker aerial refueling tankers. The seven aircraft are operated by the 101st Squadron, stationed at Incirlik.

=== September 11, 2001 attacks ===
In response to the September 11, 2001 attacks, Operation Enduring Freedom (OEF) began in October 2001. Incirlik served as a main hub for missions in support for the war in Afghanistan, including humanitarian airlift operations, MC-130 special operations missions, KC-135 refueling missions, prisoner transport to Guantanamo Bay (swap from C-17 to C-141s) and sustainment operations for deployed forces. The aerial port managed a 6-fold increase in airflow during the height of OEF. When the main bases in Afghanistan (Bagram Airfield) and the Uzbekistan air base (Karshi-Khanabad Air Base) were in use the Incirlik's airflow supporting OEF decreased to a baseline sustainment level.

=== Iraq War ===
Operation Northern Watch (ONW) ended with the start of the Iraq War on 19 March 2003. ONW flew its last patrol on 17 March 2003, and closed a successful 12-year mission to contain the Iraqi military and inactivated 1 May 2003. The 39th ASEW was also inactivated, effective 1 May 2003. The wing was completely inactivated on 16 July 2003 and the 39th Air Base Group was activated in its place.

On 19 August 2003, the first rotation of deployed KC-135 Stratotankers and airmen arrived at Incirlik to support various operations in response to the 11 September 2001 attacks as well as the post-invasion reconstruction of Iraq and the ensuing insurgency.

On 6 January 2004, more than 300 U.S. Army soldiers of what would become thousands transited through Incirlik as the first stop back to their home post after spending almost a year in Iraq. Incirlik was part of what was described as the largest troop movement in U.S. history. Incirlik provided soldiers with a cot, warm location, entertainment and food for a few hours outside of a hostile war zone.

On 12 March 2004, the 39th Air Base Group inactivated and the 39th Air Base Wing activated to provide the best mix of required support and, as new mission requirements emerge, to shoulder the burden and better contribute in the global war on terrorism.

=== 2005 Kashmir earthquake humanitarian relief ===
Incirlik played a bridge role by providing support in the relief operation started after the 2005 Kashmir earthquake on 8 October 2005. With the help of Turkish and American airmen, five C-130 Hercules cargo planes from Air Bases in Italy, Britain, Greece, and France flew urgently needed supplies including 10,000 tents from the warehouse of UNHCR in İskenderun, Turkey to Afghanistan on 19 October.

=== 2006 Hezbollah–Israel War ===
During the brief War between Hezbollah and Israel in July 2006, the Incirlik Air Base provided solace to Americans who had been evacuated by U.S. Navy warships from Beirut, Lebanon to Mersin, Turkey.

=== 2010 land claim lawsuits ===
In 2010, three Armenian Americans filed a lawsuit against the Republic of Turkey and two banks for compensation of 122 acres (0.49 km^{2}) of land in the Adana region of Turkey, where Incirlik Air Base currently stands. An American court accepted the case and granted Turkey 21 days to respond to the lawsuit. The defendant banks in Turkey requested the court extend the deadline for a response until September 2011. The court accepted the extension.

U.S District Judge Dolly Gee dismissed the case in 2013, but the dismissal did not prevent the plaintiffs from using the U.S federal courts to hold Turkish banks accountable for seizing land from Armenians during World War I. The plaintiffs filed an appeal brief on October. 21, 2013, and the United States Court of Appeals for the Ninth Circuit heard the case 17 December 2018.

=== 2015 operations against the Islamic State of Iraq and the Levant ===
On 13 October 2014, it was rumored that the Turkish government approved the use of Incirlik Air base to support operations against the so-called Islamic State but this was later denied. On 23 July 2015, it was confirmed that the Turkish Government would begin allowing USAF UAVs and USAF combat planes to fly combat sorties against ISIL in neighboring Syria out of Incirlik Air base. Ankara formally signed a deal 29 July 2015 with the United States over the use of Turkey's Incirlik air base in the U.S.-led coalition's campaign against the Islamic State, the Turkish Foreign Ministry said, Hurriyet reported. The agreement covers only the fight against the Islamic State and does not include air support for allied Kurdish fighters in northern Syria, a spokesman for the ministry said.

Between January 2015 and August 2015, the nuclear storage facility at the base underwent substantial perimeter security enhancements. These upgrades included the installation of two-lane chain-link security fences spanning 8400 meters, the establishment of a dedicated patrol road, aircraft entrance gates, and the implementation of the K8 protection aircraft barrier.

On 25 April 2016, the German Federal Armed Forces announced they would commit 65 million Euro to establish a permanent presence at Incirlik, as part of Germany's commitment to the fight against ISIL. Funds will support the permanent basing of six Panavia Tornado and one Airbus A310 MRTT within six months. These will be supported by 200 troops. Separate command post (34 million Euro) and housing and recreational facilities (10 million and 4,5 million Euro respectively) will be built by the end of 2017. As of May 2017, due to diplomatic disagreements between Germany and Turkey, the German government is considering pulling German forces out of the base. In June 2017 the German Parliament voted to leave the Incirlik Air Base and in September the troops got transferred to the Muwaffaq Salti Air Base at Azraq in Jordan.

=== 2016 Turkish coup attempt ===
As a result of the 2016 Turkish coup d'état attempt and several Turkish tanker aircraft fueling rogue Turkish F-16's, external electrical power to the base was disconnected. A Turkish no fly order was also put into effect for US military aircraft in the area. Pentagon Press Secretary Peter Cook at the time stated that "U.S. facilities at Incirlik are operating on internal power sources." EUCOM spokesman Navy Capt. Danny Hernandez said: "All our assets in Turkey are fully under control and there was no attempt to challenge that status." and "There was no chaos at this base". The security level at base did however move to DELTA, the highest level, U.S. personnel are ordered restricted to base, and locals were denied access. By 17 July commercial electrical power remained disconnected but permission from Turkey to conduct US anti-ISIS air operations from Incirlik resumed; the Turkish base commander, General Bekir Ercan Van, was arrested by Turkish forces loyal to sitting president Erdoğan. General Van sought asylum from the United States but was denied.

=== Post coup attempt deterioration of relations ===
Due to deteriorating relations with Turkey, German MPs and lawmakers have suggested withdrawing German troops and weaponry from the base, to possibly relocate them elsewhere. In September 2017 the Germans finally left Turkey and were redeployed at an airbase near Azraq in Jordan.

=== 2026 Iran war ===
During the 2026 Iran war, Incirlik Air Base was believed to be the target of an Iranian ballistic missile launched on March 4, before being intercepted by NATO's missile defense system with debris falling in the nearby Dörtyol.

== Based units ==
Flying and notable non-flying units based at Incirlik Air Base.

Units marked GSU are Geographically Separate Units, which although based at Incirlik, are subordinate to a parent unit based at another location.

=== Turkish Air Force ===
Combatant Air Force and Air Missile Defense Command

- 10th Tanker Base Command
  - 101st Tanker Squadron – KC-135R Stratotanker
  - 152nd Squadron – F-16C/D Fighting Falcon
  - 204 Squadron – AS532 Cougar
- 14th Unmanned Aircraft Systems Base Command
  - 302 Squadron (GSU) – Anka-S

=== United States Air Force ===
United States Air Forces in Europe - Air Forces Africa

- Third Air Force
  - 39th Air Base Wing
    - 39th Comptroller Squadron
    - 39th Medical Group
      - 39th Operational Medical Readiness Squadron
      - 39th Healthcare Operations Squadron
    - 39th Mission Support Group
      - 39th Civil Engineer Squadron
      - 39th Communications Squadron
      - 39th Contracting Squadron
      - 39th Force Support Squadron
      - 39th Logistics Readiness Squadron
    - 39th Weapons System Security Group
      - 39th Expeditionary Reconnaissance Squadron
      - 39th Maintenance Squadron
      - 39th Operations Support Squadron
      - 39th Security Forces Squadron

Air Combat Command

- US Air Forces Central
  - 332nd Air Expeditionary Wing
    - 447th Air Expeditionary Group

Air Mobility Command

- 521st Air Mobility Operations Wing
  - 521st Air Mobility Operations Group
    - 728th Air Mobility Squadron (GSU)

== Nuclear warhead storage ==
Incirlik airbase hosts approximately fifty B61 nuclear bombs.

Laicie Heeley, a fellow with the Budgeting for Foreign Affairs and Defense program at the Stimson Center said in 2016:

From a security point of view, it’s a roll of the dice to continue to have approximately 50 of America’s nuclear weapons stationed at Incirlik Air Base in Turkey, just 70 miles from the Syrian border. These weapons have zero utility on the European battlefield and today are more of a liability than asset to our NATO allies.

During the 2019 Turkish offensive into north-eastern Syria, tensions between Turkey and the US moved the B61 nuclear bombs, stored by the US at the İncirlik airbase, back into focus. A removal was again debated, but Vipin Narang from the Massachusetts Institute of Technology pointed out, that the process of moving them under these circumstances poses risks and the weapons "could be vulnerable to accidents, theft or attack".

== Facilities ==
Following facilities exist for the service people and their family members:

- AFN-Incirlik – Department of Defense unit providing American Forces Network programming
- Incirlik American Unit School, Home of the Hodjas. The school closed on 29 March 2016, when families were ordered to departure the base. In July 2023, Department of Defense Education Activity Europe Region leadership visited the base to assess the feasibility of returning families to Incirlik.
- Incirlik Education Center run by University of Maryland Global Campus for 12 courses per term in departments such as: English, History, Psychology, Mathematics, Science, Foreign Language, Business and management, Computers, Government, Sociology, and Criminal Justice
- Titan Fitness Center
- A Reel Time Movie Theatre that shows second-run movies
- Hodja Lakes Golf Course

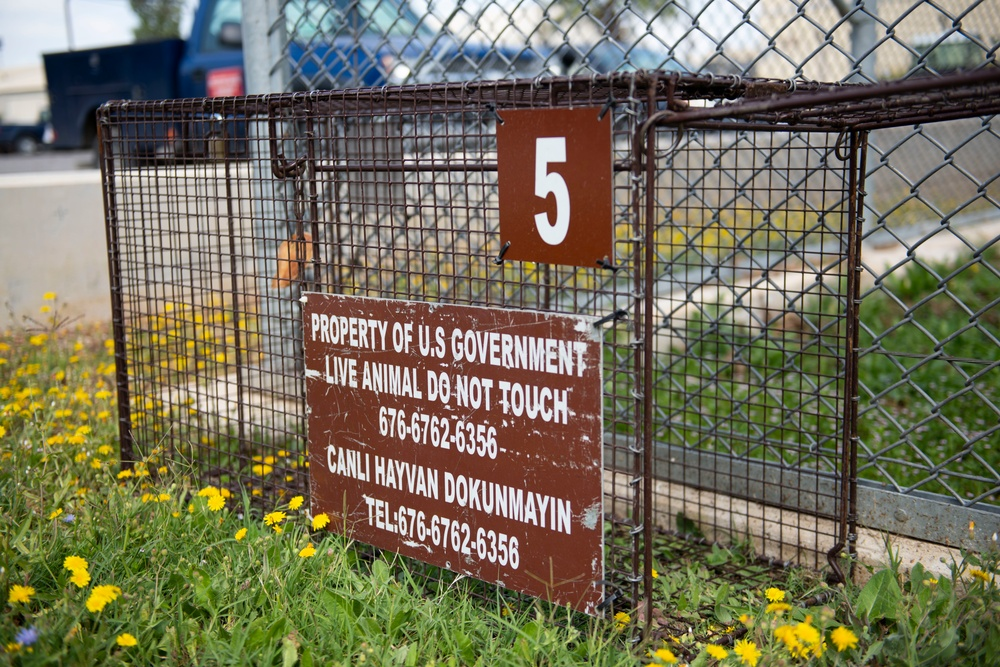

- An Outdoor Recreation Center that provides rental services of bikes, camping equipment, barbecue gear, etc. and coordinates trips to local areas
- A veterinary clinic

The 39th Civil Engineer Squadron is responsible for pest management on base. That includes wildlife management such as bee control, and frequent live trapping of cats, dogs, and foxes.

== Visiting notables ==
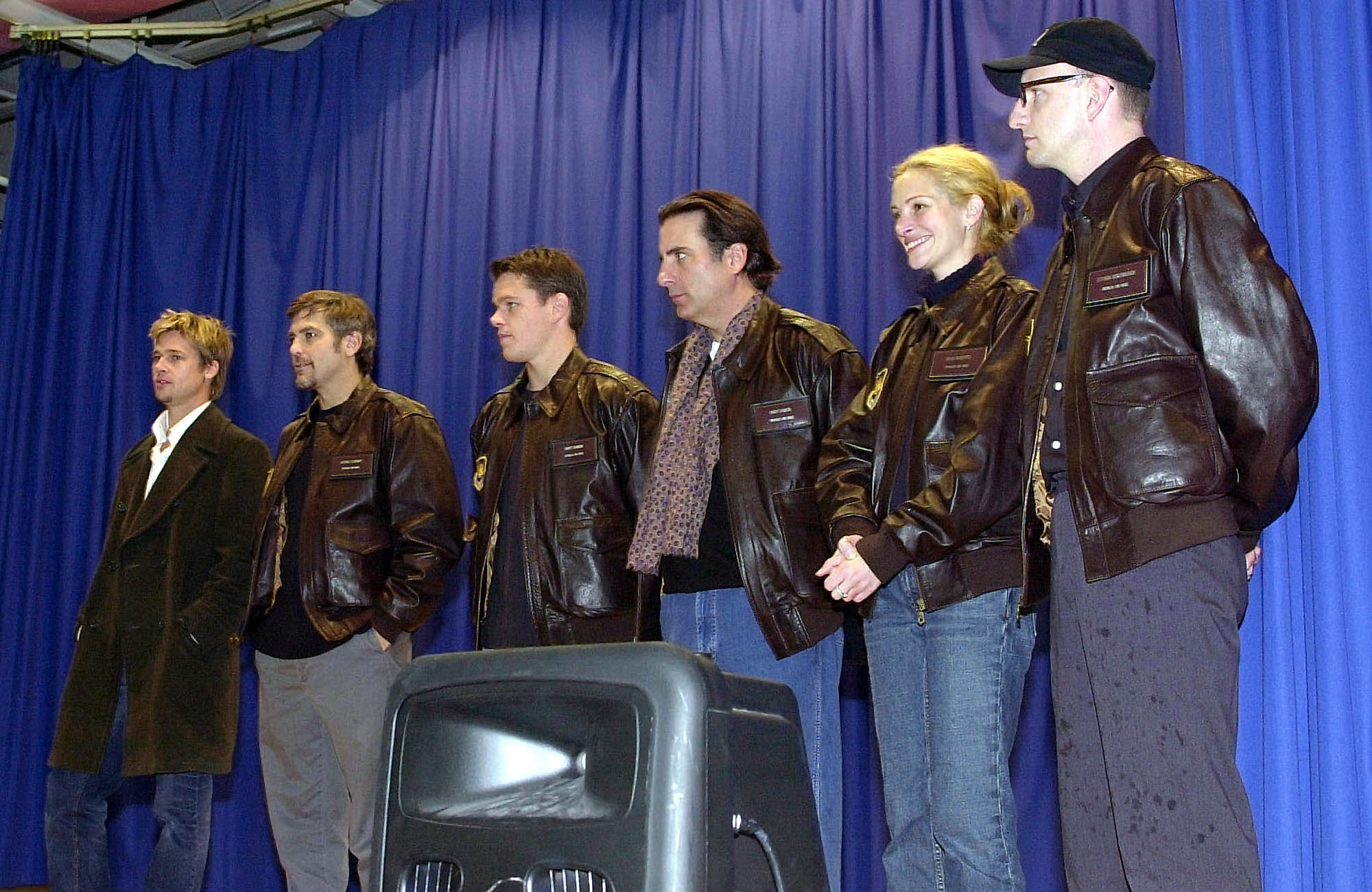
Brad Pitt, George Clooney, Matt Damon, Andy García, Julia Roberts, and Steven Soderbergh visited the base in December 2001

- The cast of the film Ocean's Eleven, George Clooney, Matt Damon, Andy García, Brad Pitt, and Julia Roberts along with director Steven Soderbergh, toured Incirlik on 7 December 2001, immediately following their movie's premiere in Los Angeles, to show American servicemen their appreciation for serving their country.
- Just weeks after losing Super Bowl XXXIII in January 1999, Atlanta Falcons star Jamal Anderson toured the base to thank service members.
- On 26 June 2006, Arizona Cardinals wide receiver Larry Fitzgerald visited the base to show support for American airmen and their families.
- In 2007, Chuck Norris visited Incirlik on his way back to the United States after visiting Iraq.
- On 6 December 2011, comedian Gabriel Iglesias and rock band Daughtry visited Incirlik Air Base to show support for American airmen and their families.

== See also ==
- List of U.S. Air Force installations
- Nuclear sharing
- Turkish-American relations
