= Turkish Military Academy =

Military academy in Ankara, Turkey

- Kara Harp Okulu
- Motto: Yıldızların İrfan Yuvası
- Motto in English: Wisdom House of Stars
- Type: Military Academy
- Established: 1834; 192 years ago
- Founder: Mahmud II
- Parent institution: National Defense University
- Rector: Erhan Afyoncu
- Dean: İbrahim Ethem Atnur
- Students: 4,000 future commissioned officers in the Turkish Army
- Location: Ankara, Turkey
- Colors: Bordeaux Black
- Nickname: Harbiye
- Website: www.kho.edu.tr

The Turkish Military Academy (Turkish: Kara Harp Okulu) or as it is known historically and popularly Harbiye is a four-year co-educational military academy and part of the National Defense University. It is located in the center of Ankara, Turkey. Its mission is to develop cadets mentally and physically for service as commissioned officers in the Turkish Army, and it is the oldest of the academies of the Armed Forces, opened in 1834.

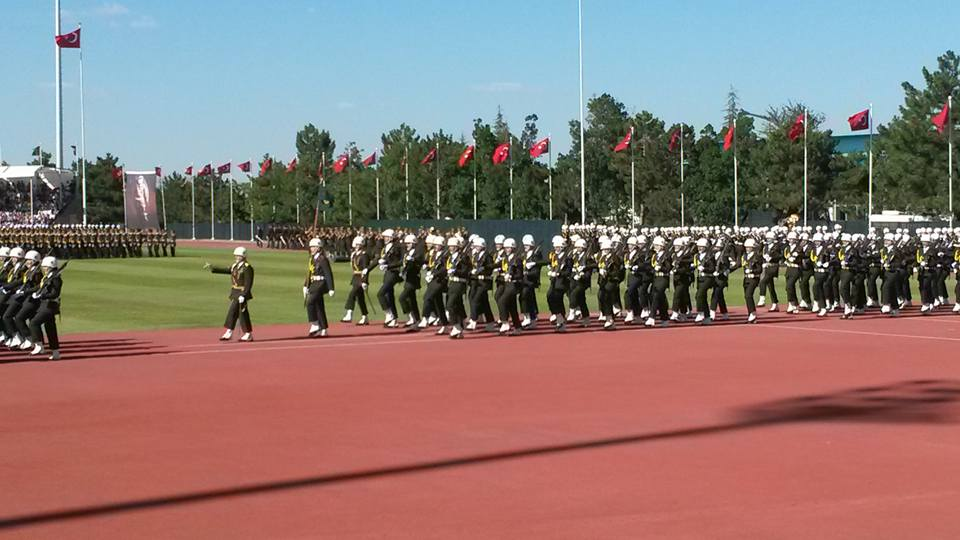
Turkish Military Academy Graduation Ceremony

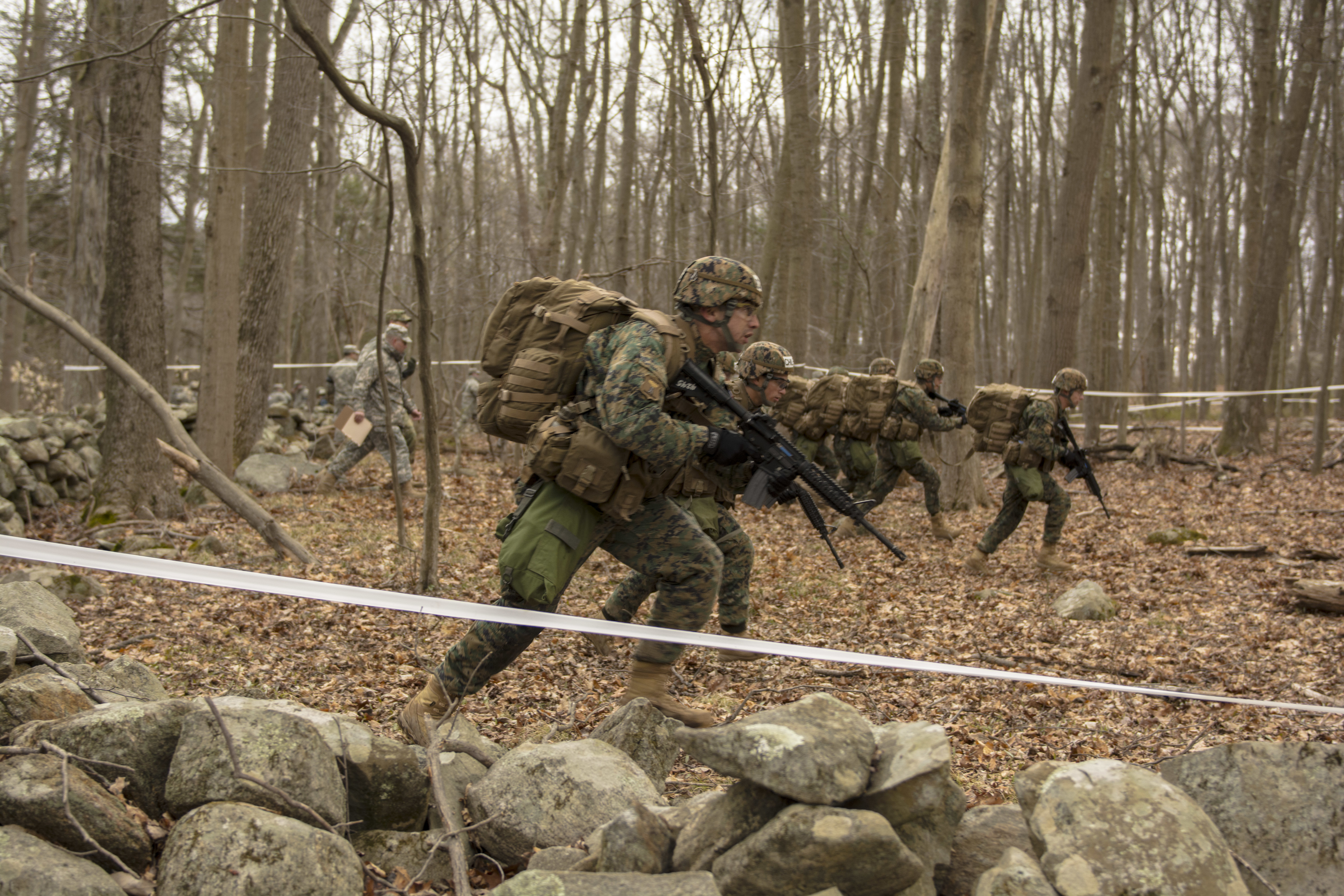
Turkish Military Academy cadets in military training at the West Point

== History ==
Some Turkish Military Academy cadets during a group photo shoot, 1914

In the Auspicious Event of 1826, Sultan Mahmud II abolished the Janissary Corps, which had existed for centuries, as part of a broader effort to reorganize the military and administrative structure of the state, developments that were later formalized during the Tanzimat reforms. In the same year, he established the Mansure Army (Romanized Ottoman Turkish: Asâkir-i Mansûre-i Muhammediye, "The Victorious Soldiers of Muhammad"). The Sultan continued his reform efforts by establishing modern institutions to support the army.

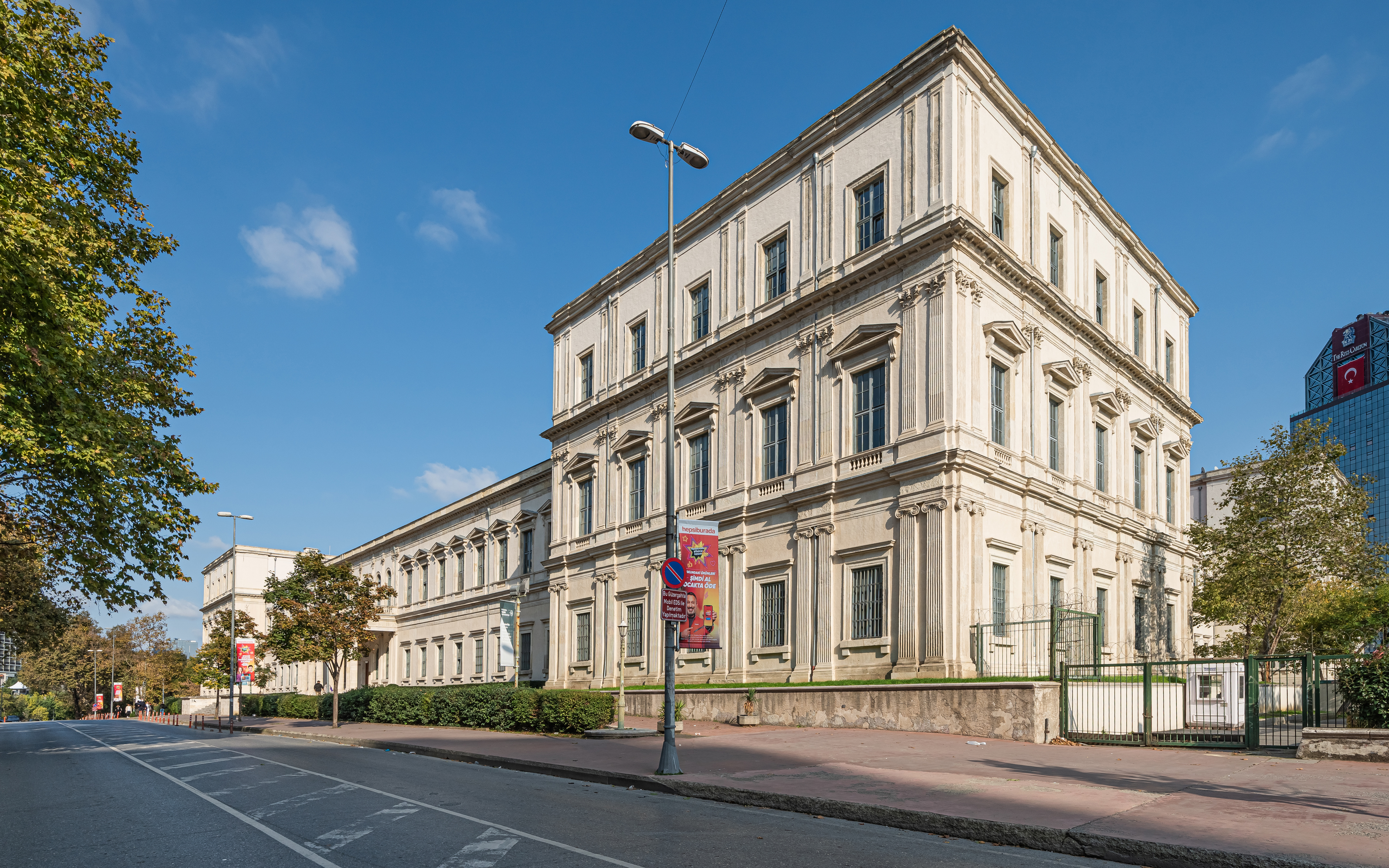
The Academy provided education in the Taşkışla, located in the Maçka district, between 1853 and 1858. Since the founding of modern Turkey, this building has been used as the Istanbul Technical University Faculty of Architecture

On 7 July 1826, a decree establishing the army was promulgated, formally announcing its creation. In 1826, the Seraskerlik was established as the central military authority and later evolved into the Ministry of War. In 1827, the first military medical school, Imperial School of Medicine, was opened to train doctors and surgeons for the army. In 1834, Mekteb-i Harbiye was opened with the support of French military instructors to train officers for the army. Hüsrev Pasha proposed to the Sultan to establish a school modeled on the École Militaire of France, which was thought to have the best army of the time. The Sultan accepted the offer and assigned Mehmed Namık Pasha and Ahmed Fevzi Pasha to establish the school. Maçka Barracks in Istanbul was chosen as the main building for the school. The school started education in November 1834. Eight months after the commencement of instruction, Sultan Mahmud II visited the school on 1 July 1835.

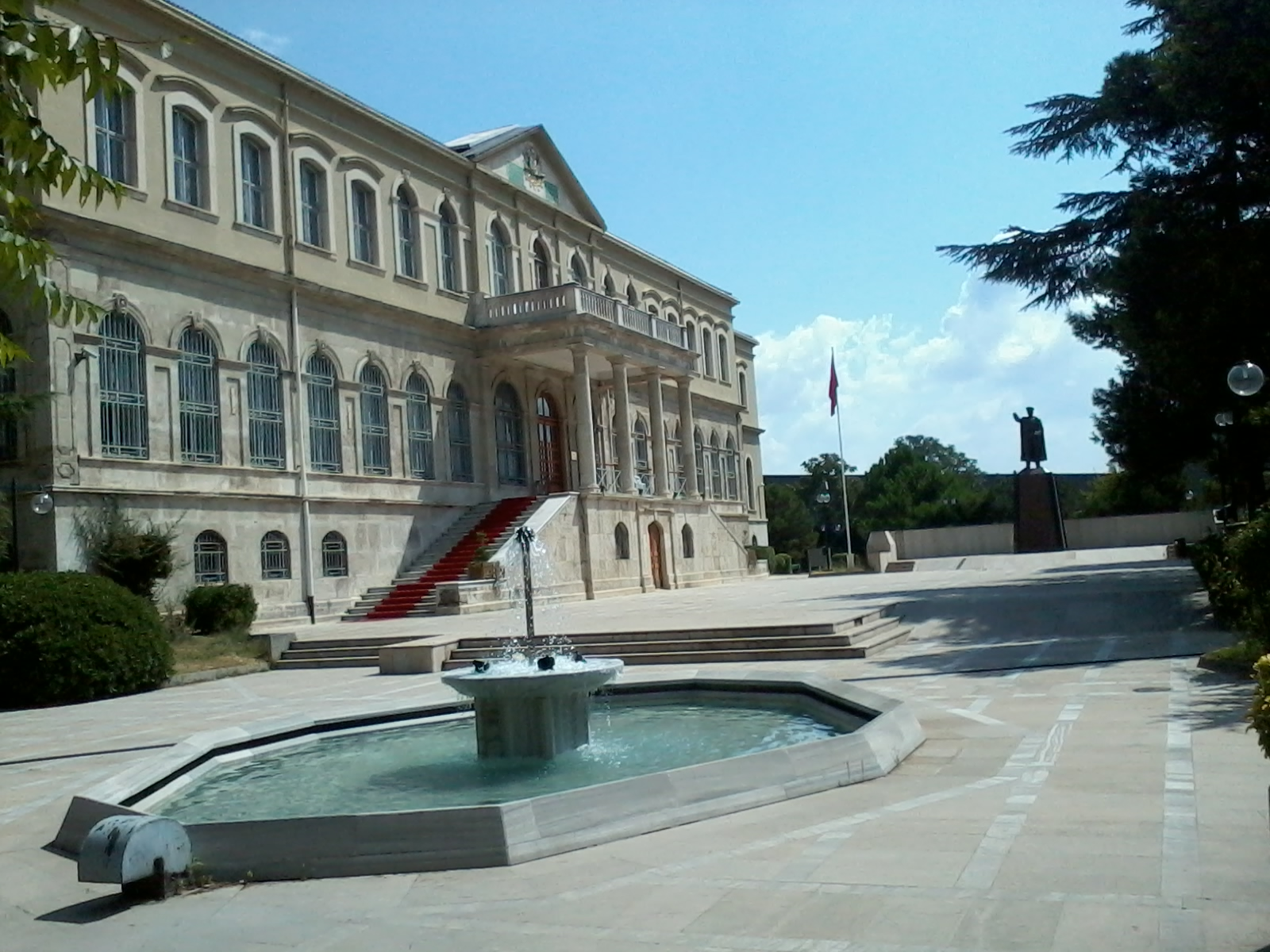
The building in the Pangaltı district, which served as the Academy's main building from 1846 to 1936, is currently used as the Istanbul Military Museum. The Academy was relocated to the capital, Ankara, in 1936

During Selim Satı Pasha’s ministry (1837-1841), those studying at the school began to be referred to as “students.” In its early period, instructors were recruited from Europe, primarily from France. While infantry and fortification courses were emphasized, French was included among the compulsory courses as of 1840. During the time of Emin Pasha (1841-1846), who had received an education in Europe, emphasis was placed on science and vocational courses. Emin Pasha strengthened the teaching staff by recruiting people who had studied in Europe like himself and some teachers working at the School of Engineering to the Military Academy.

On June 14, 1843, Sultan Abdülmecid changed the army's name to Asâkir-i Nizâmiye-i Şâhâne (Royal Regular Soldiers). From this date onward, the army began to be known simply as the Nizami Ordu (Regular Army). In 1845, he established Kuleli Military High School in the capital Istanbul. In 1848, the first military academy, Erkan-ı Harbiye Military Academy, was opened to train army staff officers and high-ranking officers, or pashas. The Crimean War was the first war effort in which the modern army took part in, proving itself as a decent force. The last reorganization occurred during the Second Constitutional Era.

In 1883, Prussian field marshal Colmar Freiherr von der Goltz entered service in the Ottoman Army and appointed Inspector of the Ottoman Military Schools. Following his appointment, a new period of reform began at the Harbiye. Goltz Pasha advocated a transition from French style, engineering focused theoretical instruction toward a more practice oriented model inspired by the Prussian War College. Under his direction, textbooks were revised, with some written by Goltz himself. Subjects emphasized in German military education, including military history, tactics, drawing, and mathematics, gained increased prominence at the academy, with particular attention given to practical instruction in military courses.

Until 1908, the Military Academy primarily trained infantry and cavalry officers. Mustafa Kemal Atatürk enrolled in the infantry branch of the Turkish Military Academy in 1899 with the cadet number 1283 and graduated in 1902. In 1905, military academies were established in Edirne, Manastır, Erzincan, Damascus, and Baghdad. Thereafter, the Military Academy in Istanbul remained the sole institution providing officer education. During successive periods of warfare, an accelerated training program was implemented to supply officers for active fronts.

After the signing of the Treaty of Lausanne, the Military Academy resumed instruction in Istanbul. On 25 September 1936, the Turkish Military Academy and its campus were relocated to Ankara, where education began in newly constructed facilities. The duration of education, initially two years, was extended to three years in 1948, reduced to two years in 1963, and again set at three years in 1971. From 1974 onward, a four-year undergraduate program was implemented.

The academy’s education system was reorganized into an integrated structure comprising military education and training, common core subjects, applied military training, physical education and sports, and academic programs. Within the academic framework, undergraduate education was provided in mechanical engineering, civil engineering, electrical and electronics engineering, and management and business administration between 1974 and 1991. Beginning with the 1991–1992 academic year, the curriculum gradually transitioned to a systems engineering program. As of the 2011–2012 academic year, the academy introduced multiple undergraduate degree programs.

After the 2016 coup d'état attempt, the Military Academy, together with the Turkish Naval Academy, the Turkish Air Force Academy, and other military educational institutions, was incorporated into the National Defense University, which was established under the Ministry of National Defense.

== Entry process ==
There are roughly 4,000 cadets attending the Turkish Military Academy at any one time. In order to enter the academy, prospective cadets must graduate from a high school then pass necessary exams and various tests. Only students displaying the potential to become officers are accepted. The academy is the only source of commissioned officers for the Turkish Army. After graduation, cadets are required to serve for 15 years.

== Education ==
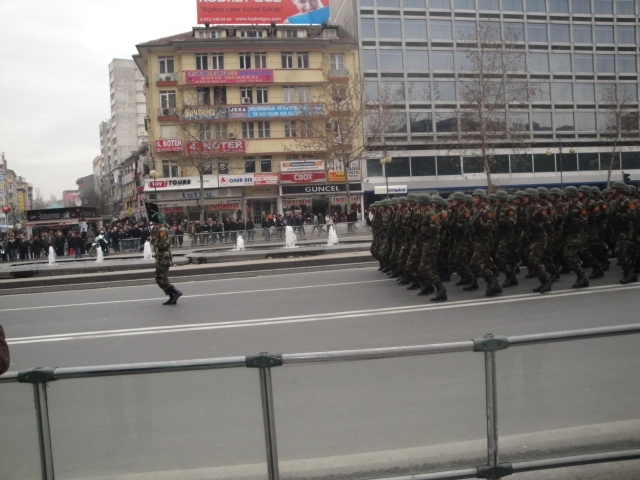
Turkish Military Academy cadets military parade in Kızılay, Ankara

The duration of education at the academy is five years, including a preparatory year. Cadets undergo both academic and military training in the academy. Upon graduation cadets commissioned as officers in the Turkish Land Forces and also receive a bachelor's degree depending on their academic education in the academy.

In addition to the officer’s commission, graduates of the Turkish Military Academy receive bachelor’s degrees in fields including industrial and systems engineering, electronics engineering, mechanical engineering, civil engineering, computer engineering, strategy and security studies, history, business administration, and international relations.

The Turkish Military Academy trains cadets for commissioning as officers in the Infantry, Armored, Artillery, Air Defense, Army Aviation, Engineer, Signal, Transportation, Supply, Maintenance, Personnel, and Finance branches of the Turkish Army. Cadets who meet the required criteria may be selected for pilot training, and a limited number of graduates are assigned to the Army Aviation branch for this purpose each year. Military training is given by the Turkish Military Academy Cadet Corps. The corps is organized as one regiment and four battalions.

The curriculum combines academic education with military and physical training. Cadets receive instruction on the organization and functions of different branches, the tactical use of weapons, and battlefield systems through regular military training conducted throughout the academic year. During the summer term, cadets participate in a six week field training program in Menteş, İzmir, which includes applied training and organized visits to historically significant sites such as Afyon and Çanakkale. The Physical Training and Sports Program includes instruction in pentathlon, shooting with firearms and air guns, athletics, diving and lifesaving, basketball, biathlon, equestrian sports, football, folk dancing, handball, skiing, orienteering, cross country activities, table tennis, archery, chess, taekwondo, tennis, triathlon, volleyball, and swimming.

== Uniforms ==
The cadet dress uniform is the same as the Turkish Army officer's uniform, except for the addition of two gold cords looped from the right shoulder across the front right suspending two metal pins. One pin is long, and symbolizes peace while the other is short and symbolizes war. The cadets are distinguishable and organized by their graduating class as well as their cadet unit. In their classroom uniform, each cadet wears a thin gold bar on their epilate for each year they have been at the academy. Senior cadets, with four bars, also wear the color of the branch of the Turkish Army that they will be entering upon graduation on their collar. For example, green for infantry and gray for armor. The under three classes wear blue on their collar which signifies that they have not yet chosen a branch. The cadet also wears an identification number, a four digit number issued upon entrance to the academy. Atatürk's cadet number, 1283, has been reserved and will not be issued to another cadet.

== Turkish Military Academy Cadet Corps ==
Turkish Military Academy Cadet Corps is made up of one regiment and four battalions named after famous campaigns during the Turkish War of Independence and WWI (except Malazgirt). 1st Battalion is the Anafartalar Battalion, 2nd is the Dumlupınar Battalion, 3rd is the Sakarya Battalion and 4th is the Malazgirt Battalion. Each battalion has a separate building, which contains a number of facilities including barracks, dining halls, classrooms, day rooms and study rooms. The cadet regiment has a cadet chain of command which rotates during the school year. The cadet regiment also has a chain of command of regular army officers in mentoring and leadership roles.

== 2024 oath controversy ==
On August 30, 2024, which is celebrated as the Victory Day in Turkey, a graduation ceremony was conducted for the academy's finishing class. During the ceremony, 960 graduates, led by valedictorian Ebru Eroğlu, recited the military oath to defend Turkey. The event was attended by Turkish President Recep Tayyip Erdogan. Approximately one hour following the graduation, Eroglu and 400 other graduates were recorded raising their swords and pledging allegiance to Mustafa Kemal Atatürk, the founder of modern Turkey. The group subsequently took an oath to uphold "a secular, democratic Turkey." In response, eight days later, Erdogan announced the initiation of an investigation and declared that “the few impertinent individuals responsible will be purged.”

According to the traditional practice continued until 2016, lieutenants graduating from the Army, Navy, and Air Force Academies recited the following oath, known as the "Officer's Oath," during their graduation ceremonies:

We solemnly swear that we will stand against any hand that dares to threaten the independence of the secular and democratic Republic of Turkey, the indivisible unity of our country, the honor and dignity of the great Turkish nation, and every inch of our sacred homeland. Our swords will always be sharp and ready. We are the children of Turkey’s future. We were born with honor, we will live with honor. How happy is the one who says, ‘I am a Turk!’

After the Officer's Oath was abolished in 2016, a different oath, began to be used in the official graduation ceremony.

In the following process, the expulsion of the lieutenants who provided written and verbal defenses before the High Disciplinary Board was requested. Ebru Eroğlu, who led the oath and recited its text, stated in her defense that she had conveyed the request to include the officer's oath in the official ceremony "through the proper chain of command." However, they were informed that the Military Academy regulations had changed, and therefore, they would not be allowed to recite the oath during the ceremony. Eroğlu emphasized that they did not violate any orders, as they did not recite the oath during the official ceremony. Meanwhile, the lieutenants' lawyer argued that although the oath was removed from the National Defense University Military Academy Ceremony Directive in 2023, it was still included in the Ministry of National Defense's regulations.

On January 31, 2025, along with three disciplinary officers, five lieutenants, including Ebru Eroğlu, were expelled.

On March 31, 2025 Ebru Eroğlu and İzzet Talip Akarsu filed a lawsuit at the Ankara Administrative Court to annul the Turkish Land Forces Command High Disciplinary Board's decision to expel them from the army. Eroğlu graduated as the top student from the academy, earning the rank of artillery lieutenant; excelling in various fields at the academy, she is also proficient in Russian.

== Notable alumni ==
- Ahmed Muhtar Pasha, Ottoman field marshal and Grand Vizier, who served in the Crimean and Russo-Turkish War
- Şeker Ahmed Pasha, Ottoman painter and soldier
- Mehmed Ali Pasha, Ottoman field marshal
- Hoca Ali Rıza, Turkish impressionist painter
- Mustafa Kemal Atatürk, founder of the Republic of Turkey
- Xhemal Aranitasi, commander in chief of the Royal Albanian Army
- Tekin Arıburun, Turkish military officer and statesman, commandant of the NATO Defense College
- Abdullah Atfeh, first chief of staff of the Syrian Army
- Fuat Balkan, Turkish sabre fencer, competed at the 1924 and 1928 Summer Olympics
- Beşir Fuad, Ottoman soldier, intellectual, and writer during the First Constitutional Era
- Fevzi Çakmak, Turkish mareşal, Minister of War of the Ottoman Empire; Chief of General Staff of the Republic of Turkey
- Cevat Çobanlı, commander of the Ottoman Army during their Dardanelles campaign in World War I
- Djemal Pasha, Ottoman general and statesman, member of the Young Turk triumvirate
- Enver Pasha, Ottoman general and statesman, member of the Young Turk triumvirate
- Rüştü Erdelhun, chief of the Turkish General Staff; chairman of the NATO Military Committee
- Behiç Erkin, Turkish career officer, first director of the Turkish State Railways
- Kenan Evren, Turkish military officer who served as the 7th president of Turkey
- Fakhri Pasha, Ottoman general and governor of Medina from 1916 to 1919
- Ragıp Gümüşpala, chief of the General Staff and founder of the Justice Party
- Taha al-Hashimi, Iraqi politician and military officer; Prime Minister of Iraq
- Kâzım Karabekir, commander of the Eastern Army of the Ottoman Empire during the Turkish War of Independence
- Mahmud Shevket Pasha, Ottoman military commander, Grand Vizier of the Ottoman Empire
- Hrant Maloyan, Syrian-Armenian military serviceman who became the general officer of the Syrian army
- Jamil Al Midfai, Iraqi politician and Prime Minister of Iraq
- Aziz Ali al-Misri, Egyptian Ottoman military officer
- Nazım Pasha, Ottoman Turkish general; Chief of Staff of the Ottoman Army during the First Balkan War
- Aziz Nesin, Turkish writer and humorist
- Osman Nuri Pasha, Ottoman Turkish field marshal
- Şükrü Âli Ögel, first director of the National Security Service (MAH), the predecessor of the National Intelligence Organization
- Fethi Okyar, diplomat, politician and military officer; founder of the Liberal Republican Party
- Ali Khulqi Sharayri, Jordanian politician
- Halil Sami Bey, Ottoman Army colonel, managed to fend off British and French forces during the Landing at Cape Helles
- Ömer Seyfettin, Turkish writer
- Süleyman Seyyid, Ottoman Turkish painter

== See also ==
- Ottoman Military College (Erkân-ı Harbiye Mektebi)
- Turkish Joint War College (Müşterek Harp Enstitüsü)
- Turkish Air Force Academy
- Turkish Naval Academy
