= Faruk Cömert =

Turkish general and statesperson (born 1946)

General Faruk Cömert, 26th Commander of the Turkish Air Force, was born in the Vezirköprü district of Samsun Province, Turkey, in 1946.

He began his military career when he entered the Air Force High School in 1960. Cömert graduated from the Air Force High School in 1965, completed his flight training and joined the front line of the Turkish Air Force as a jet pilot.

Following the completion of his education at the Turkish Air War College and the Armed Forces Academy, Cömert graduated from the Air Command and Staff College and the Academic Instructor School at the Maxwell Air Force Base in Alabama, United States. Cömert served as a Training Officer, Operations Officer, and Squadron Commander at different bases until accredited to assume the duty of his new post between 1985 and 1988 at the AIRSOUTH NATO Headquarters in Naples, Italy. After being assigned as the Operations Commander and Chief of the Operations Division, he was promoted to the rank of brigadier general in 1991.

General Faruk Cömert was assigned as the Chief of Staff of the 2nd Tactical Air Force Command for one year as a brigadier general. Afterward, he became the commander of the 8th Main Jet Base. Following this post, he assumed the office as the Chief of the Command and Control Department of the Turkish General Staff in 1994. Later, he was promoted to the rank of major general, and became the Commander of the Turkish Air War College. After performing this duty for two years, General Faruk Cömert worked as the Chief of the Agreements Department of the Turkish General Staff from 1997 to 1999. He was later promoted to the rank of lieutenant general and was assigned as the Chief of the Evaluations and Inspections Department at the Turkish Air Force Headquarters. General Cömert was then assigned as the Commander of the 1st Tactical Air Force and the 6th CAOC in 2001.

General Faruk Cömert was appointed as the Commander of the Turkish Air Force following his two-year tenure as the Commander of War Colleges.

General Faruk Cömert is married to Özay Cömert, speaks English and has two children.

Military offices
Preceded by İbrahim Fırtına	Commander of the Turkish Air Force; August 25, 2005–August 23, 2007	Succeeded by Aydoğan Babaoğlu
