= Starlink (disambiguation) =

Starlink is a very large satellite constellation by SpaceX.

Starlink may also refer to:

== Science and technology ==
- StarLink corn, a strain of genetically modified maize
- Starlink Project, an astronomical computing project
- STARLINK, a brand of automotive connectivity systems by Subaru
- STARLINK, an IT service provider from the Kingdom of Saudi Arabia (http://starlinkksa.com)

== Other uses ==
- Starlink Aviation, a Canadian charter airline
- Starlink: Battle for Atlas, a 2018 video game
- St Andrews Rail Link (StARLink), a proposed railway project in St Andrews, Scotland

== See also ==
- Star topology, in computer networking
- Starnet (disambiguation)
