= List of commanders of the Turkish Air Force =

Commander of the Turkish Air Force
- Türk Hava Kuvvetleri Komutanlığı
- Flag of Turkish Air Force Command

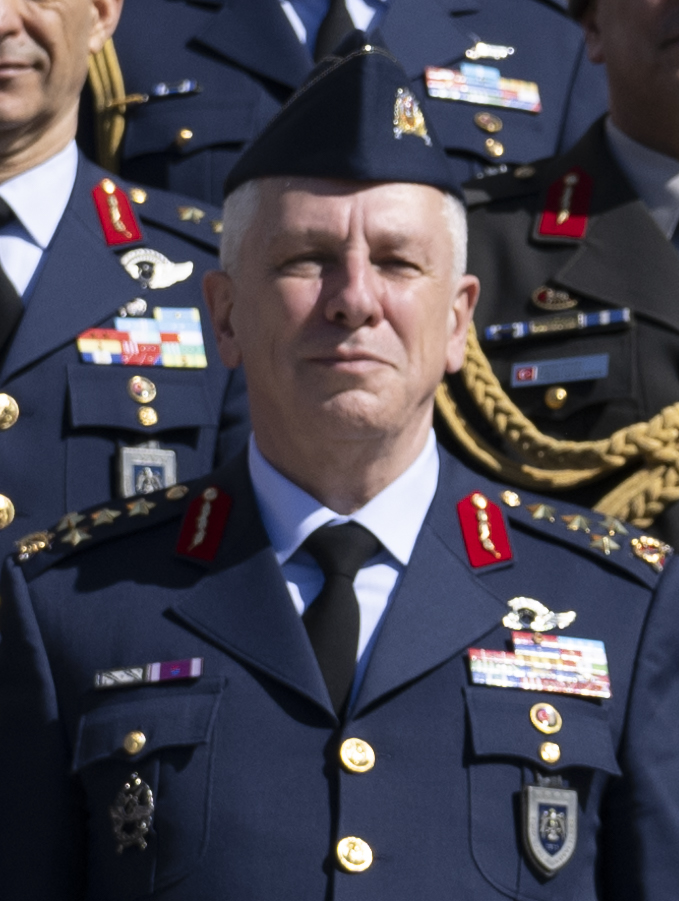
- Incumbent; General Ziya Cemal Kadıoğlu since 3 August 2023
- Ministry of National Defense; Turkish Air Force
- Member of: National Security Council; Supreme Military Council
- Reports to: Minister of National Defence
- Nominator: President
- Appointer: President
- Formation: 5 February 1944
- First holder: Zeki Doğan
- Website: www.hvkk.tsk.tr

This list includes commanders of the Turkish Air Force (Turkish: Türk Hava Kuvvetleri Komutanlığı), who were, in their time of service, nominal heads of the Turkish Air Force.

The current Commander of the Turkish Air Force is General Ziya Cemal Kadıoğlu, since 3 August 2023.

No.	Commander	Picture	Took office	Left office
1	General Zeki Doğan		5 February 1944	7 June 1950
2	General Muzaffer Göksenin		12 June 1950	20 April 1953
3	General Fevzi Uçaner		21 April 1953	23 September 1957
4	Lieutenant general Suphi Göker		17 October 1957	8 May 1959
5	General Tekin Arıburun		1 May 1959	27 May 1960
6	Lieutenant general İhsan Orgun		27 May 1960	4 August 1960
7	Lieutenant general İrfan Tansel		5 August 1960	1 June 1961
8	Major general Süleyman Tulgan		1 June 1961	19 June 1961
9	General İrfan Tansel		19 June 1961	16 August 1968
10	General Reşat Mater		16 August 1968	30 August 1969
11	General Muhsin Batur		30 August 1969	25 August 1973
12	General Emin Alpkaya		25 August 1973	5 March 1976
13	Lieutenant general Cemal Engin		24 April 1976	23 July 1976
14	General Ethem Ayan		23 July 1976	21 August 1978
15	General Tahsin Şahinkaya		21 August 1978	6 December 1983
16	General Halil Sözer		6 December 1983	22 August 1986
17	General Cemil Çuha		22 August 1986	22 August 1988
18	General Safter Necioğlu		22 August 1988	20 August 1990
19	General Siyami Taştan		20 August 1990	20 August 1992
20	General Halis Burhan		20 August 1992	18 August 1995
21	General Ahmet Çörekçi		18 August 1995	28 August 1997
22	General İlhan Kılıç		28 August 1997	25 August 1999
23	General Ergin Celasin		25 August 1999	23 August 2001
24	General Cumhur Asparuk		23 August 2001	27 August 2003
25	General İbrahim Fırtına		27 August 2003	25 August 2005
26	General Faruk Cömert		25 August 2005	23 August 2007
27	General Aydoğan Babaoğlu		23 August 2007	30 August 2009
28	General Hasan Aksay		30 August 2009	29 July 2011
29	General Mehmet Erten		4 August 2011	22 August 2013
30	General Akın Öztürk		22 August 2013	14 August 2015
31	General Abidin Ünal		14 August 2015	22 August 2017
32	General Hasan Küçükakyüz		22 August 2017	19 August 2022
33	General Atilla Gülan		19 August 2022	3 August 2023
34	General Ziya Cemal Kadıoğlu		3 August 2023	Incumbent

== See also ==
- Chief of the Turkish General Staff
- List of commanders of the Turkish Land Forces
- List of commanders of the Turkish Naval Forces
- List of general commanders of the Turkish Gendarmerie
- List of commandants of the Turkish Coast Guard
