= Hasan Küçükakyüz =

Turkish Armed Forces general

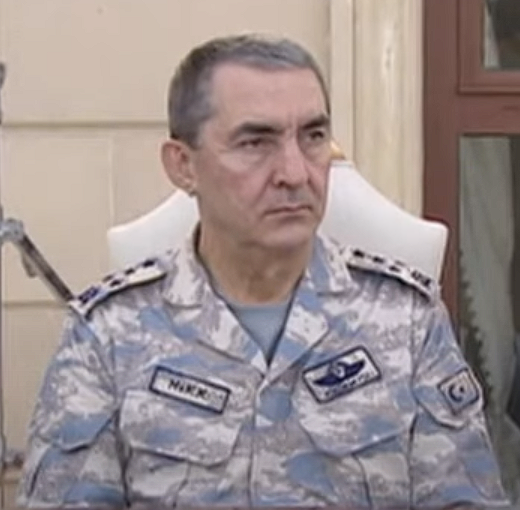
- Born: November 11, 1957 (age 68); Trabzon, Turkey
- Military career
- Allegiance: Turkey
- Branch: Turkish Air Force
- Service years: 1974–2022
- Rank: General
- Commands: Commander of the Air Force

Hasan Küçükakyüz (born November 11, 1957) is a retired four-star Turkish Armed Forces general. He was the 32nd Commander of the Turkish Air Force between 2017 and 2022, until he was retired by the decision of the Supreme Military Council.

Military offices
Preceded by Abidin Ünal	Commander of the Turkish Air Force; 2017–2022	Succeeded by Atilla Gülan
