= Joint War College =

Armed forces college in Turkey

- Müşterek Harp Enstitüsü
- Type: Military Academy
- Established: July 1954, 14; 71 years ago
- Parent institution: National Defense University
- Location: Levent, Istanbul, Turkey

Joint War College (Turkish: Müşterek Harp Enstitüsü), is a military educational institution operating under the National Defense University, headquartered in Levent, Istanbul, and provides education in joint staff-level planning, coordination, and control, as well as training in national security studies and the administration of specialized courses.

== History ==
The institution was established on 14 July 1954 under the Turkish War Academies Command, which had provided education since 1847, under the name Joint War Academy (Turkish: Müşterek Harp Akademisi). Instruction began on 14 October 1954 at Yıldız Palace in Istanbul. On 25 June 1956, the institution was renamed the High Command Academy, and on 7 August 1964 it adopted the name Armed Forces Academy (Turkish: Silahlı Kuvvetler Akademisi).

Admission to the Armed Forces Academy was based on quotas determined by the General Staff, with staff officers holding the ranks of major and lieutenant colonel selected by their respective force commands. From 1969 onward, staff officers who had not previously attended the Armed Forces Academy were also required to complete this education in two five-month terms by order of the General Staff. On 8–9 January 1977, it was relocated from Yıldız Palace to newly constructed facilities in Levent, Istanbul. By an order of the General Staff dated 20 August 1980, the Armed Forces Academy and the National Security Academy were merged under a single command affiliated with the War Academies Command, operating under the name National Security and Armed Forces Academy. In 1995, the National Security Academy was separated from the Armed Forces Academy and relocated to Ankara, where it began operating on 27 February 1995 in the building housing the Secretariat General of the National Security Council.

With amendments made to the War Academies Law No. 3563, published in the Official Gazette on 30 June 2012 (No. 28339), the National Security Academy Command was dissolved, and the Armed Forces Academy Command was renamed the Armed Forces Higher Command and Control Academy (Turkish: Silahlı Kuvvetler Yüksek Sevk ve İdare Akademisi). The institution continued its activities under the War Academies Command, directly affiliated with the General Staff, until 25 July 2016.

By Decree Law No. 669, issued on 31 July 2016 under the state of emergency and concerning the establishment of the National Defense University of Turkey, the War Academies Law was repealed. Subsequently, the organizational structure of the National Defense University was established by a decision of the Council of Ministers dated 14 November 2016 (Decision No. 2016/9522), which was published in the Official Gazette on 25 November 2016. Under the same decision, the Joint War Institute (Turkish: Müşterek Harp Enstitüsü) was established in place of the Armed Forces Higher Command and Control Academy.

== See also ==
- Ottoman Military College (Mekteb-i Harbiye)
- Turkish Military Academy (Kara Harp Okulu)
- Turkish Army War Institute (Kara Harp Enstitüsü)
- National Defense University
