= Aydoğan Babaoğlu =

Turkish air force commander

- Born: 1944 (age 81–82); Samsun, Turkey
- Occupation: military officer

General Aydoğan Babaoğlu (born 1944) is a retired Turkish military officer. He was the 27th Commander of the Turkish Air Force.

Military offices
Preceded by Faruk Cömert	Commander of the Turkish Air Force; August 23, 2007 – August 25, 2009	Succeeded by Hasan Aksay
