= Erhan Afyoncu =

Turkish historian, author, academic, television programmer (born 1967)

- Born: 1967 (age 58–59); Tokat
- Education: Marmara University
- Occupation: Academic

Erhan Afyoncu (born 1967) is a Turkish historian, author, academic, television programmer and columnist. He is the incumbent rector of the National Defense University.

== Early life and education ==
He completed his primary and secondary education in Tokat, his place of birth. After graduating from Gazi Osman Paşa High School in 1984, he enrolled in the Department of Social Studies Education at the Marmara University Atatürk Faculty of Education. He earned his master’s degree with a thesis titled Necati Efendi and the History of Crimea (Russian Sefâretnâme) and completed his PhD in 1997 with a dissertation on The Defterhâne-i Âmire (16th–18th Centuries) in the Administrative Organization of the Ottoman Empire.

== Career ==
He graduated in 1988 and began working as a research assistant in the same department in 1989. He was promoted to assistant professor in 2000, associate professor in 2008, and full professor in 2014. In 2001, he transferred to the Department of History within the Faculty of Arts and Sciences at Marmara University. In 2010, he was appointed deputy head of the Department of History, and in 2016 he served as dean of the Faculty of Arts and Sciences at Marmara University.

He hosted the television program Back Room of History with Murat Bardakçı on Habertürk TV. He also contributed articles to Habertürk History magazine, which was first published on 30 May 2010, and served as its academic coordinator until the magazine ceased publication. On 11 April 2012, he was appointed by President Abdullah Gül to the Board of Directors of the Atatürk Culture, Language and History Higher Institution. In 2016, he was appointed rector of the National Defense University.

Afyoncu has served as editor for works on Ottoman history, including the Bailo of Constantinople reports and the histories of Johann Wilhelm Zinkeisen and Nicolae Iorga. His works have been translated into English, German, Arabic, Chinese, Serbian, Macedonian, Albanian, Romanian and Korean.

== Personal life ==
He is married to historian Fatma Afyoncu and has three children.

== Publications ==
- Das Osmanische Reich: Unverhüllt, Yeditepe Yayınevi
- Kıbrıs Meselesi, Tarih Ve Tabiat Vakfı Yayınları (TATAV) (with Ali Ahmetbeyoğlu)
- Ermeni Meselesi Üzerine Araştırmalar, Tarih Ve Tabiat Vakfı Yayınları
- Osmanlı'nın Hayaleti, Yeditepe Yayınevi
- Ottoman Empire Unveiled, Yeditepe Yayınevi
- Sorularla Osmanlı İmparatorluğu, Yeditepe Yayınevi
- Osmanlı Tarihi Araştırma Rehberi, Yeditepe Yayınevi
- Ermeni Meselesi Üzerine Araştırmalar, TATAV Yayınları
- Fatih ve Fetih Albümü, TATAV Yayınları
- Tanzimat Öncesi Osmanlı Tarihi Araştırma Rehberi, Yeditepe Yayınları
- Osmanlı İmparatorluğu'nda Askeri İsyanlar ve Darbeler (with Uğur Demir ve Ahmet Önal), Yeditepe Yayınevi, İstanbul, 2010 ISBN 978-605-4052-20-2-
- Truva'nın İntikamı, Yeditepe Yayınevi, İstanbul, 2009ISBN 978-605-4052-11-0.
- Yavuz’un Küpesi, Yeditepe Yayınevi, İstanbul, 2010ISBN 978-605-4052-35-6.
- Muhteşem Süleyman, Yeditepe Yayınevi, İstanbul, 2011ISBN 978-605-4052-55-4-
- Fransa'ya Osmanlı Tokadı, Yeditepe Yayınevi, İstanbul, 2011
- Kanuni ve Şehzade Mustafa, Yeditepe Yayınevi, İstanbul, 2012
- Venedik Elçilerinin Raporlarına Göre Kanuni ve Pargalı İbrahim Paşa, Yeditepe Yayınevi, İstanbul, 2012
- Sahte Mesih (Sabatay Sevi and the Jews, the Founder of the Revolution in the Light of the Ottoman Documents), İstanbul, 2013
- İstanbul'un Kapısı Sultanbeyli Tarihi, (with Vahdettin Engin, İlber Ortaylı and Mehmet Mazak), Yeditepe Yayınevi, İstanbul, 2013
- Peçesi Düşen Osmanlı: Çince, Yeditepe Yayınevi, İstanbul, 2014
- Son Dünya Düzeni, Yeditepe Yayınevi, İstanbul, 2014
- Süleyman Şah Türbesi, Yeditepe Yayınevi, İstanbul, 2015ISBN 978-605-5200-77-0-
- Muhteşem Valide: Kösem Sultan, Yeditepe Yayınevi, İstanbul, 2015ISBN 978-605-9787-23-9-
- Turhan Sultan, Yeditepe Yayınevi, İstanbul, 2015ISBN 978-605-9787-24-6-
- Baltacı ve Katerina, Yeditepe Yayınevi, İstanbul, 2015 (with Uğur Demir)ISBN 978-605-9787-30-7

Political offices
Preceded by -	National Defense University Rector; 2016–present	Incumbent
