= National Defense University (Turkey) =

Military university established in 2016 and primarily located in Beşiktaş, Istanbul

Coordinates: 41.1010°N 29.0135°E

Turkish National Defense University
- Millî Savunma Üniversitesi
- Type: Military University
- Established: July 2016, 31; 10 years ago
- Rector: Prof. Erhan Afyoncu
- Vice rectors: Prof. Serdar Salman; Prof. Talat Canbolat; Rear Admiral Erhan Aydın; Major General Burhan Aktaş
- Location: Yenilevent, Beşiktaş, Istanbul
- Colors: Red Olive
- Mascot: Star and crescent
- Website: msu.edu.tr

National Defense University (Turkish: Millî Savunma Üniversitesi) is a military university established in 2016 and primarily located in Beşiktaş, Istanbul. The university education and training started with the ceremony held on 12 February 2017 at the Turkish Air Force Academy.

== History ==
From the first half of the 19th century, reforms were introduced in the organization of the Ottoman and later Turkish Armed Forces in response to global developments. In 1845, the first military high school was established, followed by the founding of war academies in 1848. The Turkish Naval Academy, established in 1773, and the Turkish Military Academy, established in 1834, were later incorporated into the system of military academies. The Turkish Air Force Academy was subsequently established in 1951.

Until 2016, military high schools and academies in Turkey operated under the authority of the Turkish General Staff. Education and training activities were conducted in accordance with Turkish Armed Forces directives and were overseen by the Education and Doctrine Command (EDOK). These institutions provided training for commissioned and non-commissioned officers.

Following the 2016 Turkish coup d’état attempt, military educational institutions were included in a broader reorganization of the armed forces. As part of this process, several military high schools and the War Academies were closed by decree on 31 July 2016, and enrolled students were dismissed. In the same decree, the National Defense University was established to provide associate, undergraduate, and graduate-level education in order to meet the future training needs of commissioned and non-commissioned officers.

== Academic structure ==
=== War Colleges ===
- Turkish Joint War College
- Turkish Army War College
- Turkish Naval War College
- Turkish Air War College

=== Institutes ===
- Atatürk Strategic Studies and Graduate Institute
- Alparslan Defence Sciences and National Security Institute
- Fatih Institute of Military History Studies

=== Academies ===
- Turkish Military Academy
- Turkish Naval Academy
- Turkish Air Force Academy

=== NCO Vocational HE Schools ===
- Turkish Army NCO Vocational HE School
- Turkish Naval Petty Officer Vocational HE School
- Turkish Air NCO Vocational HE School
- Turkish Military Band NCO Vocational HE School
- School of Foreign Languages

== Administrative structure ==
=== Rectorship ===
When the university was established, the rector was selected by the President of Turkey from among three candidates, upon the recommendation of the Minister of National Defense and the approval of the prime minister. Vice-chancellors were appointed by the Minister of National Defense, with a maximum of four people. It was predicted that the university organization would be formed later with the decision of the Council of Ministers. However, after the political system change in Turkey in 2018, the appointment of the rector and the organization decision was left to the president.

#	Name	Task start	Mission end	Source
1	Erhan Afyoncu	4 October 2016	Present	

=== Administrative units ===
National Defense University
Academic Units
NCO Schools	Military Schools	Institutes

== See also ==
- Turkish Military Academy
- Turkish Naval Academy
- Turkish Air Force Academy
- Istanbul Military Museum
