= NATO Science, Technology and Research Network =

The NATO Science, Technology and Research Network (STARNET) was developed to deal with the vast and rapidly growing amount of data relevant and vital to the success of the research and development process and the overall advancement and enhancement of technology innovation and development.

The STARNET facilitates access to World Wide Web resources and information elements in terms of science, technology, and overall research. STARNET provides a virtual library; a "one-stop" source for policy makers, program managers, scientists, engineers, researchers and others for relevant information resources.

== Introduction ==
The vast and rapidly growing amount of scientific and technical data and information concerning the diffusion of technology and innovation has increased pressure on organizations to push forward with their own technological developments and to take steps to maximize their inclusion into the research and development (R&D) process. This massive collection of data is vital to scientists, engineers, program managers, policy analysts, resource managers, and others. Access and communication to this information are central to the success of the innovation process in general and the management of R&D activities in particular.

In addressing this problem within NATO, the Information Management Committee (IMC) of the NATO Research and Technology Organization (RTO) developed the Science, Technology and Research Network (STARNET). The purpose of this network is to facilitate access to information elements already existing worldwide in terms of science, technology, and overall research.

STARNET is a database of Web-based data sources designed to facilitate access by providing comprehensive and sophisticated searches to worldwide science, technology, and research information. STARNET is unique in that it provides a searchable database of Web-based information resources relevant to nine scientific or thematic nodes.

STARNET provides a value added resource; it filters the vast amount of information available on the World Wide Web to significantly improve the identification, delivery, and quality of needed information.

Content submission of pertinent web resources is provided by NATO countries and by STARNET users’ nominations. A central NATO managing agent, the NATO Research and Technology Agency (RTA), maintains STARNET, assisted by IMC members to provide quality control and assure links to appropriate content.

Each Web resource is evaluated for content and substance, and then cataloged into the appropriate STARNET node. Each node has specific topics assigned, and each node has its own inventory of selected web-available information resources based on relevance to the topics assigned to that node.

STARNET has been designed as a system that can be adapted to address specific information needs as they arise within the NATO community.

STARNET also provides a News and Events page pertinent to each Node, which provides a listing of conferences, meetings, or seminars that might be of interest to the user. Each entry provides details and registration requirements, as well as a Website one can visit for other particulars.

Another feature is a Nominate Resource page, which provides the user a nomination form for proposing a Website for inclusion into STARNET. The user fills in as many of the metadata elements as possible, and then submits the nomination to a content manager for review and evaluation before inclusion in the STARNET.

== Nodes ==
STARNET is composed of nine scientific or thematic nodes; each node has specific topics assigned to each node. Each node has its own inventory of selected web-available information resources based on the relevance to the topics assigned to that node.

After accessing the STARNET Homepage, the user is introduced to the following nine scientific or thematic nodes:

- Aerospace and Aerospace-related Information Node (ARIN)
- Command, Control, Communications and Intelligence(C3I)
- Defense Against Terrorism Information Node (DTIN)
- Environmental and Biological Sciences Information Node (EBSIN)
- Information Sciences Node (INSCIN)
- Land-Based Operations Node (LBON)
- Modeling and Simulation Information Node (MSIN)
- Naval, Marine and Sea Node (NAVMAS)
- Research Planning Node (RESPLAN)

Clicking on any of the nodes will introduce the user to the Homepage of that node from which you can mount your searches. The Node Homepage also displays the Topic Area Descriptions and Resources of the node, as well as Organization Type Descriptions and Resources.
