= Combat Air Force Command =

Subordinate command of the Turkish Air Forces

- Founded: 5 August 2014; 10 years ago
- Country: Turkey
- Branch: Turkish Air Force
- Type: Combat and defence command
- Role: "gathering main combatant elements of the Air Force Command under a single command"
- Part of: Air Training Command; Air Logistics Command
- Garrison/HQ: Eskişehir, Turkey

Commanders
- Current commander: General Ziya Cemal Kadıoğlu

Insignia
- Combat Air Force and Air Missile Defense Commander

The Combat Air Force Command (Turkish: Muharip Hava Kuvveti Komutanlığı) is one of the three military formations and the main commands of the Turkish Air Force. Established on 5 August 2014 followed by the merger of the two main commands, "Combat Air Forces" and "Air Missile Defense Command", it is responsible for gathering major aviation combat elements in the country. It operates airforce base, fleet and other equivalent commands as well as aviation school, responsible for providing military education and training for the air force officers.

== Background ==
Before the two commands were merged, they were stationed at Diyarbakır, Southeastern Anatolia Region. However, after 2016 military coup d'état, Combat Air Force and Air Missile Defense Command was moved to Eskişehir in the same year. It coordinates with Deputy Commander and Combined Air Operations Centers Command for monitoring the land and sea units as well as airspace and missile defense of the Air Force and the Turkish Armed Forces.

It is also tasked with to maintain airspace in wartime by coordinating with the Turkish Air Force Command and the General Staff of the Armed Forces, in addition to providing strategic and economic support to the Turkish military.
