= Turkish Air Force Academy =

Military academy for the Turkish Air Force in Istanbul, Turkey

- Motto: İstikbal göklerdedir
- Motto in English: The future is in the sky
- Type: Military Academy
- Established: 1951; 75 years ago
- Parent institution: National Defense University
- Rector: Erhan Afyoncu
- Dean: Nurettin Acır
- Students: ~1,000
- Location: Yeşilyurt, Istanbul, Turkey; 40.96822°N 28.84042°E
- Website: hho.msu.edu.tr

The Turkish Air Force Academy (TAFA; Turkish: Hava Harp Okulu) is a co-educational military academy located in Istanbul, Turkey. It is part of the National Defense University. The Air Force Academy covers an area of 4.5 million square meters. Indoor and outdoor facilities are at Yeşilyurt, Istanbul and flight and encampment facilities are at Yalova.

It was founded in 1951, replacing the Army Flight School, with the mandate to train the officers of the Turkish Air Force. The academy provides an engineering education to Air Force cadets from Turkey as well as a number of other countries, and prepares them for careers in their respective Air Forces. Since 1992, the academy has accepted female cadets and allied countries' cadets for enrollment. TAFA is recognized by the Turkish Council of Higher Education, as a university accredited to grant engineering degrees. It is distinct from the Turkish Air War College (Turkish: Hava Harp Enstitüsü), which functions as a postgraduate staff college.

== History ==
Early official interest in aviation within the Ottoman Empire was recorded on 8 June 1908, when the Ottoman Ministry of Foreign Affairs stated that concessions could be granted for postal and passenger transportation between cities using aircraft and airships, and that further initiatives would be pursued based on information obtained from the embassies in Berlin and Vienna. A report dated 26 September 1909 by Major Enver Bey, the Ottoman military attaché in Berlin, concerning rigid airship and airship artillery was accepted by the Ottoman General Staff, leading to efforts to procure such equipment.

In September 1910, military manoeuvres held in Picardy, France, were observed by Ottoman officers Mustafa Kemal, Ali Fethi, and Major Selahaddin Bey. On 13 October 1910, a decision was taken to send several officers to Europe in order to develop aviation capabilities and to prioritise the training of aviation personnel.

On 1 June 1911, the Aircraft Commission (Turkish: Tayyare Komisyonu) was established under the chairmanship of Lieutenant Colonel İsmail Bey. The commission was responsible for selecting personnel to be sent to Europe for aviation training and for activities related to the establishment of an air school and aviation centre. A second commission was subsequently formed under the chairmanship of Lieutenant Colonel Süreyya Bey to conduct studies on establishing an aircraft school and aviation centre in Istanbul. Following these studies, the Ottoman General Staff decided on 5 March 1912 to establish an air school, and a contract was signed with the French REP Aircraft Factory for the establishment of the school and the training of aviation personnel.

With the outbreak of the World War I, German specialists were brought to the air school, and some pilot candidates were sent to Germany for training. Flight instruction at the school subsequently began using two-seat, dual-control training aircraft supplied from Germany, enabling formal flight training to be conducted at the institution.

The Air Force Academy was first founded as the Air School in order to develop Turkish Military Aviation. It began operations on July 3, 1912 in Yeşilköy, Istanbul then moved to Eskişehir in 1926 and France-trained Captain Muzaffer Göksenin became its first director. In 1930, officers were sent to Italy and the United States for pilot training, in addition to those sent to flight schools in France and the United Kingdom. Following the decision to introduce fighter jets into the inventory of the Air Force Command, eight officers were sent to the United States in 1950 to receive jet aircraft training. As a result of developments in aviation and, in particular with the introduction of jet fighters into the Turkish Air Force, Chief of Staff of the Air Force Lieutenant General Muzaffer Göksenin renamed the Air School in Eskişehir into the Air Force Academy on October 1, 1951 under the command of Staff Colonel Gavsi Uçagök. The 56 Air Force 3rd Lieutenants who graduated on August 30, 1953 were the first officers who were trained by the Air Force Academy. On the same day, the Air Force Academy received its standard from the Air Force Commander Lieutenant General Fevzi Uçaner on behalf of the President of the Turkish Republic.

On September 17, 1954, the Air Force Academy was moved to İzmir. In 1955, flight training was moved back to the period after the initial two-year academic education and the number of trainees was increased from 68 to 136. The highest number of cadets was recorded in 1955, when 429 cadets were enrolled. In the same year, the academy admitted its first female cadet. After 1960, the Air Military High School became the main source of cadets for the Air Force Academy. On July 4, 1967 the academy was moved to Istanbul in order to be able to access the resources and instructors of the universities and War Academies. The facilities which were constructed in Yeşilyurt, Istanbul for the Air Military High School were converted for the Air Force Academy.

On August 30, 1968 the Air Force Academy had its first graduates in Istanbul. The duration of the training was expanded from two years to three years in the 1969-1970 education period, and to four years in 1974. Until 1960, female cadets were admitted to the academy. In 1992, after 32 years once again they began to be admitted, and a total number of 134 female officers have graduated from the academy from 1996 to 2011. Since 1992, 120 cadets of friendly and allied countries have also been trained in the Turkish Air Force Academy. The Aeronautics and Space Technologies Institute was founded in 2001 for graduate studies. The institute serves as a higher education institute for both Air Force and other service branches.

After the 2016 Turkish coup d'état attempt, the Air Force Academy, together with the Military Academy, the Naval Academy, and other military educational institutions, became part of the National Defense University, which was established under the Ministry of National Defense.

== Education ==
The Academy educates pilot candidates with training in science and technology, preparing them for the professional requirements of military service in the Turkish Armed Forces. Education is delivered through a combination of academic instruction, military training, physical education, and affective development. The Turkish Air Force Academy is a four-year higher education institution providing undergraduate education alongside military and physical training.

=== Academic program ===
==== Undergraduate programs ====
The Academy provides theoretical and practical instruction through the following departments: Aeronautical Engineering, Electronic Engineering, Computer Engineering, Industrial Engineering, Applied Sciences, Military and Social Sciences, Foreign Languages, and Administrative Sciences.

The academy operates pedagogical and social clubs as part of its extracurricular activities. Cadets participating in these clubs present their work during the annual Eagles’ Week and on other occasions.

Social clubs at the Academy include the Band Club, Music Club, Drawing and Marbling Club, Folk Dance Club, Model Aircraft Club, Electronics Club, Media Club, and Drama Club.

==== Graduate programs ====
The Aeronautics and Space Technologies Institute (ASTIN) initially offered graduate programs in Aeronautical, Electronic, Computer, and Industrial Engineering. An Aerospace program was introduced in the 2003–2004 academic year. The Institute currently offers five Master of Science (M.S.) programs, compared to four at its inception. In addition, Doctor of Philosophy (Ph.D.) programs are offered in four disciplines. An M.S. program in Administrative Sciences has also been introduced.

=== Physical training ===
Cadets undergoing pilot training receive physical training as part of their preparation for operational duties. The Physical Training Department provides instruction in sports and physical education as part of the Academy’s training program.

The Academy participates annually in sports events organized by the Conseil International du Sport Militaire (CISM) and the European Union Air Force Academies (EUAFA).

Sports offered at the Academy include shooting, athletics, basketball, fencing, football, aeronautical pentathlon, handball, cross-country running, orienteering, table tennis, taekwondo, volleyball, swimming, tennis, and chess. Participation in a sports branch is a required component of cadet training.

=== Military training ===
Military training is conducted through programs including mechanics, marksmanship and rifle practice, military culture, and protocol.

During their education at the Academy, cadets also receive applied flight training as part of the curriculum.

In addition, leadership and character training are included in the Academy’s training program.

The academy includes supporting service units such as the Security Company Command, Light Weapons Maintenance Unit, Photography Studio, Service Company Command, Engineering and Maintenance Battalion Command, Communications, Electronics and Information Systems Company Command, Band Command, and Transportation Battalion Command.

== See also ==
- Turkish Air Force Museum
