= Müveddet Kadın =

Consort of Ottoman Sultan Mehmed VI

- Born: Şadiye Çıhçı; 12 October 1893; Derbent, İzmit, Ottoman Empire (present day İzmit, Turkey)
- Died: 20 December 1951 (aged 58); Çengelköy, Bosphorus, Istanbul, Turkey
- Burial: Çengelköy Cemetery
- Spouse: Mehmed VI (m. 1911; died 1926) Şakir Bey Eminpaşazade (m. 1932; div. 1936)
- Issue: Şehzade Mehmed Ertuğrul
Names
- Turkish: Şadiye Müvvedet Kadın; Ottoman Turkish: مودت قادین
- House: Çıhçı (by birth); Ottoman (by marriage)
- Father: Kato Davut Çıhcı
- Mother: Ayşe Hanım
- Religion: Sunni Islam

Müveddet Kadın (Ottoman Turkish: مودت قادین; "Duration"; born Şadiye Çıhçı, after 13 June 1949 Müveddet Çiftçi; 12 October 1893 – 20 December 1951) was the third consort of Sultan Mehmed VI of the Ottoman Empire.

== Early life ==
Müveddet Kadın was born on 12 October 1893 in Derbent, İzmit. Born as Şadiye Çıhçı, she was a member of Abkhazian noble family, Çıhçi. Her father was Kato Davud Bey Çıhçı, and her mother was Ayşe Hanım. She was the paternal aunt of Mehmed VI's fourth consort, Nevvare Hanım, daughter of her brother Mustafa Bey.

Her paternal aunt Habibe Hanım, chief treasurer of Mehmed, took her in the Dolmabahçe Palace at the age of nine. Here her name according to the custom of the Ottomam court was changed to Müveddet. She was then placed in the service of Şayeste Hanım, Mehmed's adoptive mother, in the Çengelköy Palace. She was tall, with blue eyes and auburn hair.

== First marriage ==
Müveddet married Mehmed on 24 April 1911 in the mansion of Çengelköy. A year after the marriage, on 5 November 1912, she gave birth to the couple's only son and only male of his father, Şehzade Mehmed Ertuğrul. After Mehmed's accession to the throne on 4 July 1918, she was given the title of "Second Kadın". Of the four consorts Mehmed had during his reign, Müveddet was the only one, apart from First Consort Nazikeda Kadın, to receive the title of Kadın. She probably got it because she was the mother of the sultan's only son. Müveddet was much loved by the sultan’s other daughters and by their grandchildren, who used to call her “Mini Anne”. Princess Leyla Açba described her as a shy, kind-hearted and hardworking woman. In 1918, her husband fell in love with Nevvare Hanım, her niece, and married her despite Müveddet's opposition.

Mehmed was deposed on 1 November 1922, and went into exile with their son Ertuğrul on 17 November 1922. She, together with other members of his family, was kept under house arrest at the Feriye Palace by order of the new parliament until 10 March 1924, when they were sent into exile. Müveddet, with Nazikeda, joined Mehmed in San Remo. She remained until Mehmed's death in 1926.

== Second marriage ==
After Mehmed's death, she moved to France with her step-daughter Ulviye Sultan and later she went to Alexandria in 1929, and married Şakir Bey, son of Emin Pasha, in 1932. Her son always refused to accept his mother's second marriage, and never saw her again. They divorced on 28 February 1936.

== Last years and death ==
Her only son’s sudden death in 1944 devastated Müveddet Kadın, who developed depression. She was finally allowed to return to Turkey in 1948, where she settled in a small room in Çengelköy Palace. On 13 June 1949 she became a Turkish citizen under the name of Müveddet Çiftçi. She died on 20 December 1951 in her small room in Çengelköy Palace and was buried in the Çengelköy mausoleum.

== Issue ==
Name	Birth	Death	Notes
Şehzade Mehmed Ertuğrul	5 November 1912	2 July 1944	unmarried, and without issue

== In popular culture ==
- Müveddet is a character in T. Byram Karasu's historical novel Of God and Madness: A Historical Novel (2007).

== See also ==
- Kadın (title)
- Ottoman Imperial Harem
- List of consorts of the Ottoman sultans

== Sources ==
- Açba, Leyla (2004). Bir Çerkes prensesinin harem hatıraları. L & M. ISBN 978-9-756-49131-7.
- Bardakçı, Murat (2017). Neslishah: The Last Ottoman Princess. Oxford University Press. ISBN 978-9-774-16837-6.
- Sakaoğlu, Necdet (2008). Bu Mülkün Kadın Sultanları: Vâlide Sultanlar, Hâtunlar, Hasekiler, Kandınefendiler, Sultanefendiler. Oğlak Yayıncılık. ISBN 978-6-051-71079-2.
- Uluçay, M. Çağatay (2011). Padişahların kadınları ve kızları. Ötüken. ISBN 978-9-754-37840-5.
