= Inşirah Hanım =

Consort of Ottoman Şehzade Mehmed Vahdeddinin

İnşirah Hanım
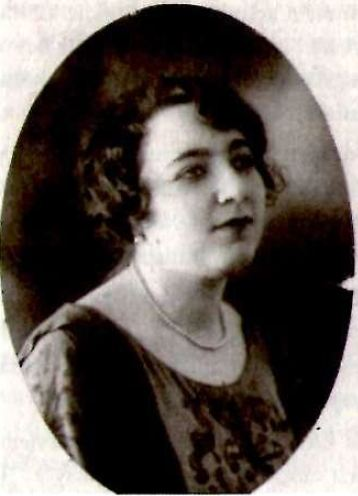
- Born: Seniye Voçibe; 10 July 1887; Maşukiye, İzmit, Ottoman Empire
- Died: 10 June 1930 (aged 42); Cairo, Kingdom of Egypt
- Burial: Emir Sultan Cemetery, Istanbul
- Spouse: Şehzade Mehmed Vahdeddin (m. 1905; div. 1909)
Names
- Turkish: Seniye Inşirah Hanım; Ottoman Turkish: انشراح خانم
- House: Voçibe (by birth); Ottoman (by marriage)
- Father: Aziz Voçibe
- Religion: Sunni Islam

İnşirah Hanım (Ottoman Turkish: انشراح خانم; "relief, cheer, joy"; born Seniye Voçibe; 10 July 1887 − 10 June 1930) was the second consort of Sultan Mehmed VI of the Ottoman Empire, but divorced by him before he ascended to the throne.

== Early life ==
İnşirah Hanım was born on 10 July 1887 in Maşukiye, İzmit. Born as Seniye Voçibe, she was a member of Ubykh noble family, Voçibe. Her father was Aziz Bey Voçibe. She had a brother named Zeki Bey (1880s – 1930s). She was a niece of Dürriaden Kadın, a consort of Sultan Mehmed V (Mehmed VI's older half-brother).

She was taken into palace by one of her relatives. Here her name according to the custom of the Ottoman court was changed to İnşirah. She then became a lady-in-waiting to Şayeste Hanim, a consort of Sultan Abdülmejid I and adoptive mother of Mehmed VI. İnşirah was described as a tall beauty, with gorgeous blue eyes and very long dark brown hair.

== Marriage ==
One day, when Mehmed was in his forties, he visited his adoptive mother Şayeste Hanım at her palace. Here he saw İnşirah, then seventeen years old, and he asked Şayeste to give him İnşirah in marriage. For the previous twenty years, Mehmed had had only one wife, Nazikeda Hanım. However, after having three daughters, in 1894 Nazikeda became unable to bear any more children. Mehmed was crown prince, so she allowed him to take other consorts in order to have a male heir. İnşirah did not want to marry Mehmed and wrote to her father and brother, saying that she would not marry a man who could be her father. Both of them severely scolded her and forced her to accept the marriage, and İnşirah finally relented. The marriage took place on 8 July 1905 in the Çengelköy Palace. She remained childless. After her marriage, her brother, Zeki Bey became aide-de-camp to Mehmed.

İnşirah was not happy, but she was still described as jealous of Mehmed. One day, she caught Mehmed in the bedroom with a servant girl named Periru Kalfa. She stated this as her reason to leave the Palace and ask for a divorce, which Mehmed granted angrily, since he felt insulted by her. After which he divorced her on 17 November 1909. Since she divorced before Mehmed's accession to the throne in 1918, she never became an Imperial Consort.

== Later years and death ==
At the exile of the imperial family in March 1924, İnşirah settled before in Validebağı in Cairo. It is not known why she left Turkey, since as a divorced consort she was no longer part of the dynasty and was therefore not forced into exile. Her brother, however, remained with Mehmed, even after her divorce, and followed him into exile.

In Cairo she was reportedly miserable, and thought of going to Sanremo, where Mehmed VI Vahideddin now lived. Her brother Zeki Bey - aide to the former sultan - refused to let her meet her former husband. After repeated requests from her part, he reportedly told her: “Go back where you came from, what are you doing here? You left this man before, you have no right to ask for his help.” He gave her a pouch of money, set her up in a hotel room and then sent her to Cairo the following day. Mehmed VI never found out that his former wife had been in Sanremo. Back in Cairo, İnşirah became even more unhappy, and attempted suicide, but her niece Zernigül Hanım was able to save her; however, she later tried again, and committed suicide by tossing herself in the Nile on 10 June 1930. Her family brought her body back to Istanbul and buried her in the Emir Sultan cemetery.

== See also ==
- Ottoman Imperial Harem
- List of consorts of the Ottoman sultans

== Sources ==
- Uluçay, M. Çağatay (2011). Padişahların kadınları ve kızları. Ötüken. ISBN 978-9-754-37840-5.
- Sakaoğlu, Necdet (2008). Bu Mülkün Kadın Sultanları: Vâlide Sultanlar, Hâtunlar, Hasekiler, Kandınefendiler, Sultanefendiler. Oğlak Yayıncılık. ISBN 978-6-051-71079-2.
- Açba, Leyla (2004). Bir Çerkes prensesinin harem hatıraları. L & M. ISBN 978-9-756-49131-7.
- Bardakçı, Murat (2017). Neslishah: The Last Ottoman Princess. Oxford University Press. ISBN 978-9-774-16837-6.
