= Şehzade Mehmed Ertuğrul =

Ottoman prince (1912–1944)

- Born: 5 November 1912; Vahdettin Pavilion, Çengelköy, Constantinople, Ottoman Empire (present-day Istanbul, Turkey)
- Died: 2 July 1944 (aged 31); Cairo, Kingdom of Egypt
- Burial: Abbas Hilmi Pasha Mausoleum, Cairo, Egypt
- Dynasty: Ottoman
- Father: Mehmed VI
- Mother: Müveddet Kadın
- Religion: Sunni Islam

Şehzade Mehmed Ertuğrul Efendi (Ottoman Turkish: شهزاده محمد ارطغرل; 5 November 1912 – 2 July 1944) was an Ottoman prince, the last child and only son of Sultan Mehmed VI, the last sultan of the Ottoman Empire. His mother was Mehmed's second consort Müveddet Kadın.

== Early life ==
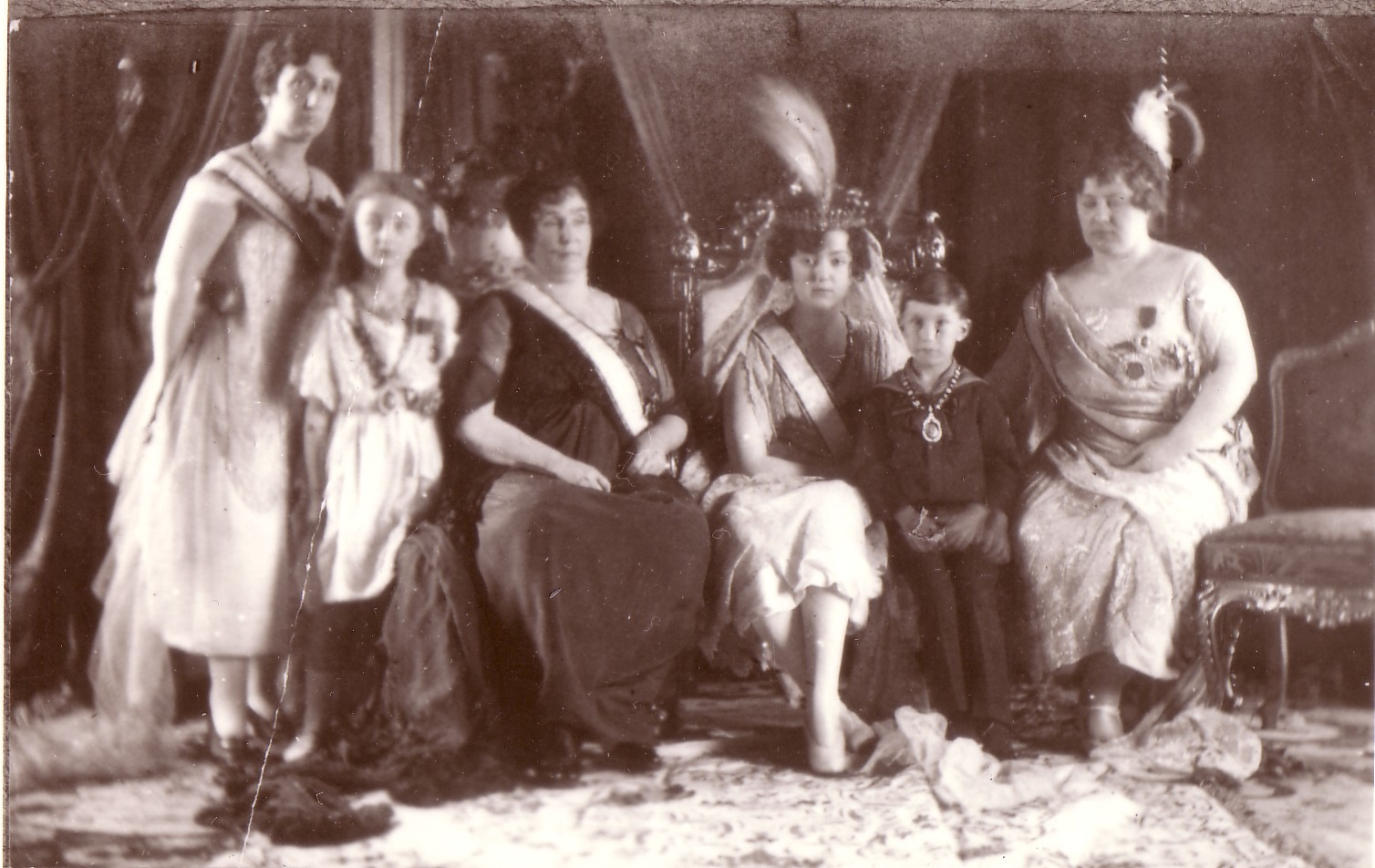
Ertuğrul (second from right) at his half-sister Sabiha's (third from right) wedding, 29 April 1920

Şehzade Mehmed Ertuğrul was born on 5 November 1912 in his father's mansion in Çengelköy. His father was Mehmed VI, son of Abdulmejid I and Gülistu Kadın. His mother was Müveddet Kadın, daughter of Kato Davut Çıhcı and Ayşe Hanım. He was the only son and fourth and last child born to his father and the only child of his mother. Ertuğrul was educated privately. His tutor was Kaymakam Emin Bey, who taught literature in the imperial school.

== Life in exile ==
When his father left Turkey on 17 November 1922, he only took Ertuğrul and a small number of Palace officials with him. The other members of the family, including his mother, later joined them in Sanremo in 1924. He and his mother were assigned one floor in his father's villa. After his father's death in 1926, Ertuğrul, who was then fourteen years old, left his mother, and went to live with his elder half-sister, Sabiha Sultan.

His mother meanwhile went to Egypt, married a Turk there, and then taking advantage of the law allowing the widows of the sultans to return to Turkey, moved back to Istanbul, and settled in the mansion in Çengelköy, which she jointly owned. Ertuğrul always refused to accept his mother's second marriage, and never saw her again. He was then enrolled in a boarding school in Grasse, where he studied for several years.

== Death ==
Ertuğrul died at the age of thirty-one at Cairo, Egypt on 2 July 1944. He had fallen sick during a tennis match, and died a few hours later of an unidentified illness. He was buried in the mausoleum of Abbas Hilmi Pasa, in Cairo. His death devastated his mother, who fell into depression and never recovered.

== Honour ==
- Order of the House of Osman

== Sources ==
- Bardakçı, Murat (2017). Neslishah: The Last Ottoman Princess. American University in Cairo Press. doi:10.2307/j.ctv2ks70vz. ISBN 978-9-774-16837-6. JSTOR j.ctv2ks70vz.
- Bardakçı, Murat (2006). Son Osmanlılar: Osmanlı hanedanının sürgün ve miras öyküsü. Hürriyet Gazetecilik ve Matbaacılık A.Ş.
