= Mehmed VI =

Sultan of the Ottoman Empire from 1918 to 1922

- Custodian of the Two Holy Mosques; Khan
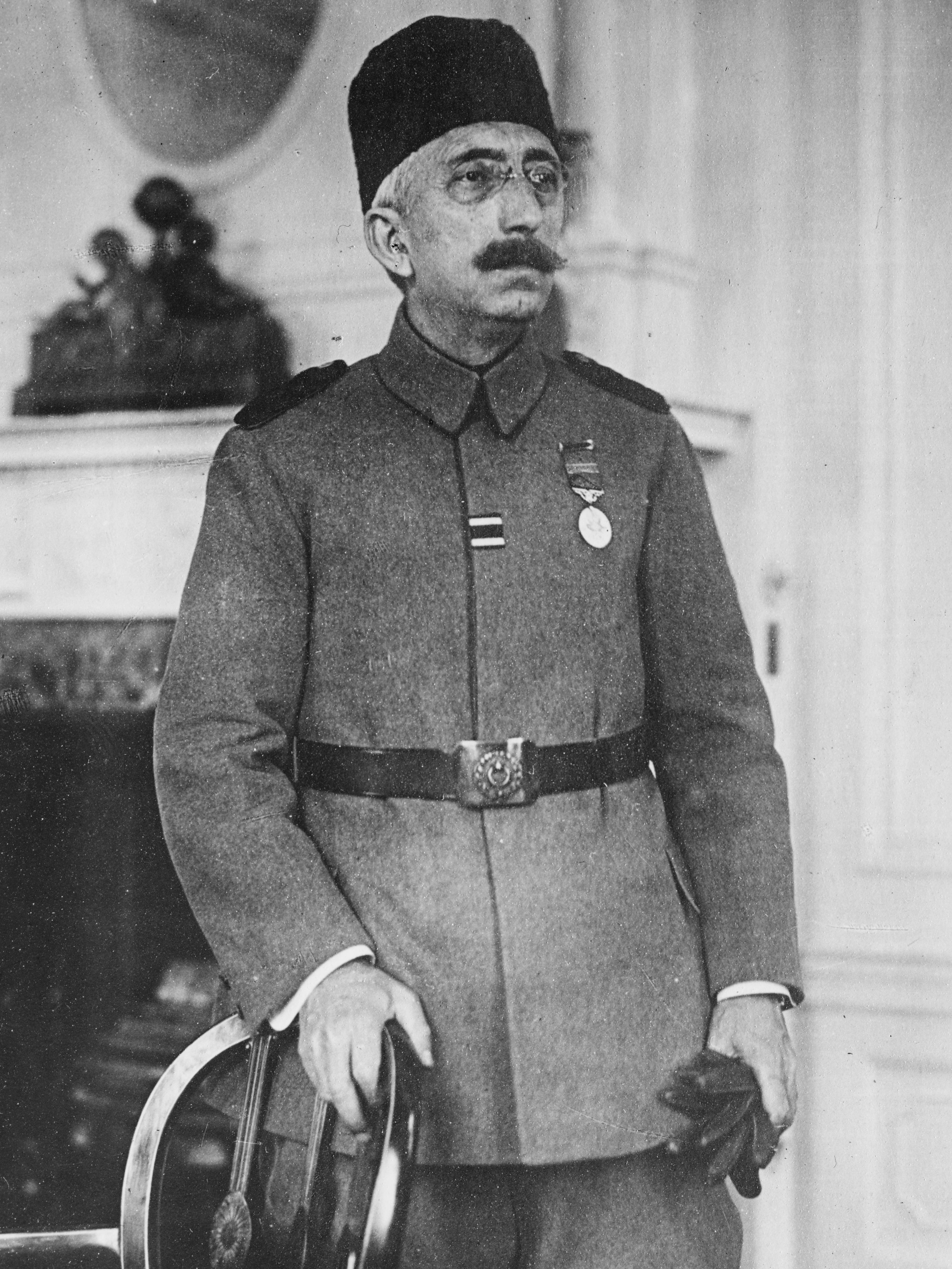
- Mehmed VI in 1918

Sultan of the Ottoman Empire (Padishah)
- Reign: 4 July 1918 – 1 November 1922
- Predecessor: Mehmed V
- Successor: Monarchy abolished
- Grand Viziers: See list: Mehmed Talaat Pasha Ahmed Izzet Pasha Ahmet Tevfik Pasha Damat Ferid Pasha Ali Rıza Pasha Salih Hulusi Pasha

Ottoman caliph (Amir al-Mu'minin)
- Reign: 4 July 1918 – 19 November 1922
- Predecessor: Mehmed V
- Successor: Abdulmejid II

Head of the Osmanoğlu family
- Reign: 19 November 1922 – 16 May 1926
- Successor: Abdulmejid II
- Born: 14 January 1861; Dolmabahçe Palace, Constantinople, Ottoman Empire
- Died: 16 May 1926 (aged 65); Sanremo, Kingdom of Italy
- Burial: 3 July 1926; Cemetery of Sulaymaniyya Takiyya, Damascus, Syria
- Consorts: Nazikeda Kadın (m. 1885) Inşirah Hanım (m. 1905; div. 1909) Müveddet Kadın (m. 1911) Nevvare Hanım (m. 1918; div. 1924) Nevzad Hanım (m. 1921)
- Issue: Münire Fenire Sultan; Fatma Ulviye Sultan; Rukiye Sabiha Sultan; Şehzade Mehmed Ertuğrul
Names
- Mehmed Vahdeddîn Han bin Abdülmecid
- Dynasty: Ottoman
- Father: Abdulmejid I
- Mother: Gülistu Kadın (biological); Şayeste Hanım (adoptive)
- Religion: Sunni Islam
- Tughra

Mehmed VI Vahideddin (Ottoman Turkish: محمد سادس, romanized: Meḥmed-i sâdis, or وحيد الدين, Vaḥîdü'd-Dîn; Turkish: VI. Mehmed or Vahideddin, also spelled as Vahdettin; 14 January 1861 – 16 May 1926), also known as Şahbaba (lit. 'Emperor-father') among the Osmanoğlu family, was the last sultan of the Ottoman Empire and the penultimate Ottoman caliph, reigning from 4 July 1918 until 1 November 1922, when the Ottoman Sultanate was abolished and replaced by the Republic of Turkey on 29 October 1923.

Vahdettin was a son of Sultan Abdul Mejid I and viewed as unlikely to become Sultan because of his distant rank in the Ottoman line of succession. He enjoyed a comfortable princedom under the reign of his half-brother Abdul Hamid II, but entered the spotlight in 1916 when he became Crown Prince. He acceded to the throne after the death of Mehmed V Reşad on 4 July 1918 as the 36th padishah and 115th Islamic Caliph, taking Mehmed VI as his regal name.

Mehmed VI's chaotic reign began with Turkey suffering defeat by the Allied Powers with the conclusion of World War I nearing. The subsequent Armistice of Mudros legitimized further Allied incursions into Turkish territory, resulting in an informal occupation of Istanbul and other parts of the empire. An initial process of reconciliation with Christian minorities over their massacres and deportations failed when the Greek and Armenian patriarchates renounced their flocks' status as Ottoman subjects, marking a definitive end of Ottomanism. During the Paris Peace Conference, Mehmed VI turned to Damat Ferid Pasha to outflank Greek territorial demands on Turkey diplomatically through Allied appeasement, but to no avail. Unionist elements within the military, discontent with the government's appeasement in the face of partition and the establishment of war crimes tribunals, established a nationalist resistance to resume war. Mehmed's most significant act as Sultan was dispatching Mustafa Kemal Pasha (Atatürk) to reassert government control in Anatolia, which backfired when Mustafa Kemal emerged as the leader of the Turkish national movement against the Sultan's wishes.

With the Greek Occupation of Smyrna on 15 May 1919 galvanizing the Turkish nationalists and beginning the Turkish War of Independence, Mehmed told the Turks to not resist the Greeks. The Allies occupied Istanbul militarily on 16 March 1920. Sultan Mehmed VI dissolved the nationalist dominated Chamber of Deputies and suspended the Constitution. When the Turkish nationalists stood against Allied designs for a partition of Anatolia, Kemal Pasha responded by establishing a provisional government known as the Grand National Assembly based in Ankara, which dominated the rest of Turkey, while the Sultan's unpopular government in Istanbul was propped up by the Allied powers and effectively impotent. A civil war erupted when Mehmed condemned the nationalist leaders as infidels and called for their execution, though the Ankara government claimed it was rescuing the Sultan-Caliph from manipulative foreigners and ministers. The Sultan's Istanbul government went on to sign the Treaty of Sèvres, a peace treaty which would have partitioned the empire, and left the remainder of the country without sovereignty.

With Ankara's victory in the independence war, the Sèvres Treaty was abandoned for the Treaty of Lausanne. On 1 November 1922, the Grand National Assembly voted to abolish the Sultanate and to depose Mehmed VI as Caliph and he subsequently fled the country on a British battleship. His cousin Abdul Mejid II was elected Caliph in his stead, though he too, and the entire Osmanoğlu family were soon exiled after the abolition of the Caliphate. On 29 October 1923, the Republic of Turkey was declared with Mustafa Kemal Pasha as its first president, ending the Ottoman monarchy. Mehmed VI died in exile in 1926 in San Remo, Italy, having never acknowledged his deposition.

== Early life ==
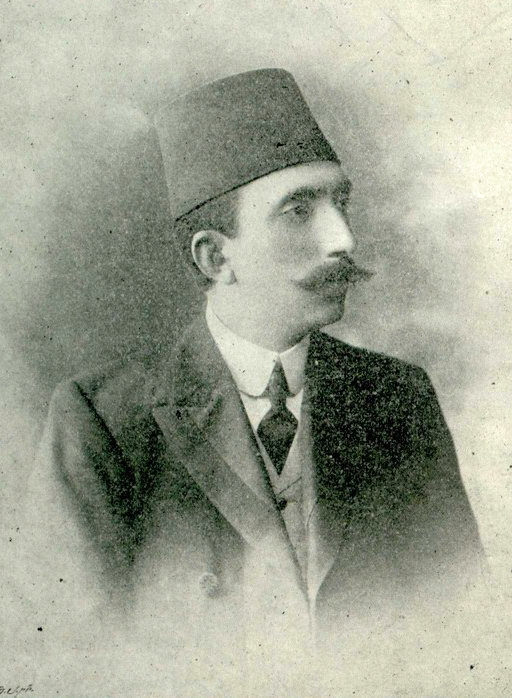
Prince Vahdeddin, Resimli Kitab magazine

Mehmed Vahdeddin was born on 14 January 1861. His father was Sultan Abdul Mejid I, who died five months after he was born. Abdul Mejid had forty-two children and Vahdeddin was his last child, putting him tenth in line to the succession. All of his siblings were half-siblings from different consorts and concubines, save for Mediha Sultana. His mother Gülistû Kadın was of Georgian-Abkhazian origin, the daughter of Prince Tahir Bey Chachba. Vahdeddin was orphaned when she died from one of the many cholera outbreaks of the time when he was four years old.

After his mother's death, Vahdeddin Efendi was adopted by Şâyeste Hanım, another of his father's consorts. The Şehzade had a rough time with his overbearing adoptive mother, and at the age of sixteen he left his adoptive mother's mansion with the three servants who had been serving him since childhood. He grew up with nannies, servant girls, and tutors. Physically he had a weak constitution, something he may have inherited from his father. As he grew older he developed atrophy in one of his lungs and heart palpitations.

Vahdeddin educated himself by taking lessons from private tutors, becoming a man of intellect and deep religious knowledge. He read a great deal, and was interested in various subjects, including the arts, which was a tradition of the Ottoman family. He became well versed in calligraphy and music, learning to write in the naskh script and to play the qanun. He became interested in Sufism and, unknown to the Palace, he attended courses at the madrasa of Fatih on Islamic jurisprudence, Islamic theology, interpretation of the Quran and the Hadiths, as well as the Arabic and Persian languages. He attended the dervish lodge of Ahmed Ziyaüddin Gümüşhanevi, located not far from the Sublime Porte, where Ömer Ziyaüddin of Dagestan was the spiritual leader, and he became a disciple of the Naqshbandi order. From time to time, the Sheikh-ul-Islam would have to contend with Vahdeddin demanding an amendment on a fatwa which did not follow fiqh. Before moving to the Feriye Palace, the Şehzade had lived briefly in the mansion in Çengelköy owned by Şehzade Ahmed Kemaleddin.

In his youth he collected pistols and carried one on him throughout his life. He enjoyed skeet shooting and was a good shot. His closest friend was Şehzade Abdul Mejid (later proclaimed as Caliph Abdul Mejid II), the son of his uncle, Sultan Abdul Aziz. They went on hunting trips together in the forests beyond the Bosphorus. Their bond was later tied by marriage when Vahdeddin's daughter Sabiha married Abdul Mejid's son Ömer Faruk – the two fell in love before lobbying their parents for an unprecedented cousin marriage within the Ottoman family. Their friendship went against the prevailing Mejidian–Azizian feud: Abdul Aziz's children believed their father was murdered following the 1876 coup d'état, and were suspicious Abdul Mejid I's children orchestrated it. (Note: The Mejidian branch of the royal family ruled the empire until its end for the next 47 years through the reigns of Murad V, Abdul Hamid II, Mehmed V, and then Mehmed VI. This also fueled resentment of Abdul Aziz' children.) In the years to come however, the two cousins had an intense falling out over the politics of the Turkish War of Independence, reactivating the feud between their respective branches.

During the 33-year reign of Abdul Hamid II, Vahdeddin was considered to be the Sultan's closest half-brother. He gave him an allowance to supplement the money he received from the state, and his own mansion in Çengelköy, designed by the architect Alexandre Vallaury, which bore his name: the Vahdettin Pavilion. Vahdeddin built another house next to it on the estate for his adoptive mother Şâyeste. Sabiha explained her father's uncommonly close relationship with Abdul Hamid due to his distaste towards family intrigues, something in common with Abdul Hamid's personal paranoia. When he ascended to the throne, this closeness greatly influenced his political attitudes, such as his intense dislike of the Young Turks and the Committee of Union and Progress (CUP), his sympathy for the British, and a wait-and-see policy to political problems.

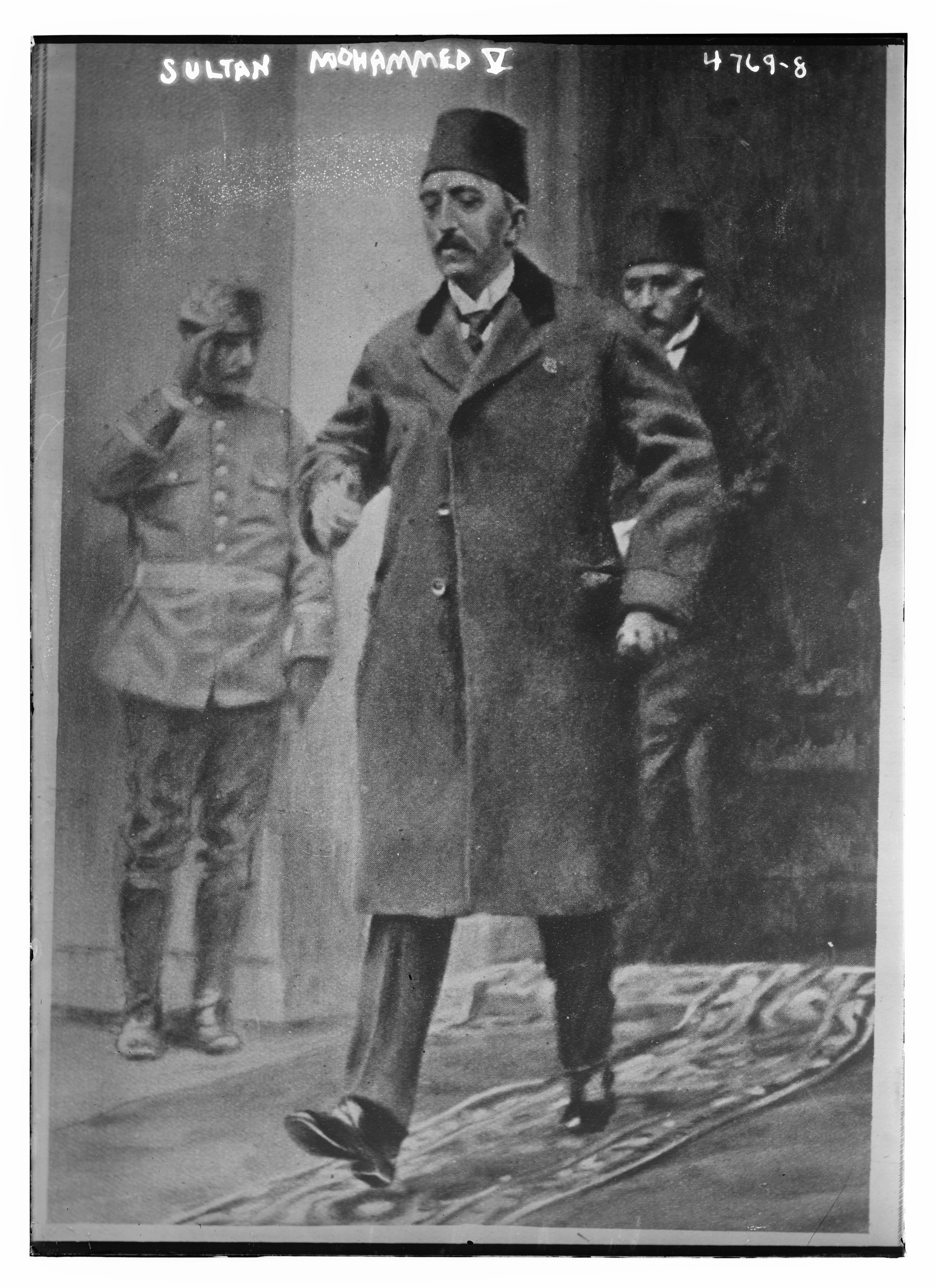
Mehmed in 1915

Much of Vahdeddin's princedom, especially under Abdul Hamid II, was spent in luxurious peace, without care for politics or conflict. After all, during Abdul Hamid's reign, he was behind Reşâd Efendi, Kemaleddin Efendi, Süleyman Efendi, and Yusuf İzzeddin Efendi in the succession, so it did not seem likely he would ever come to the throne. At Feriye he liked to host guests, and frequently organized music parties with his fasıl orchestra, which consisted of musician apprentices whom he personally took care of in training. Many of the popular alaturka musicians of the time frequented his Çengelköy Pavilion. While Vahdeddin was not one for pomp and flamboyancy, he did care for fashion. He was one of the best dressed princes of the royal family, and his first consort Nazikeda Hanım made sure their daughters dressed in the most contemporary styles, which invited compliments from Abdul Hamid and other members of the royal family.

In 1909, at the age of forty-six, he took his first steps outside of Constantinople when he accompanied his half-brother, the new Sultan Mehmed V Reşâd on a tour of Bursa. He accompanied him for another royal tour of Edirne a year later.

One of his first conflicts with the CUP was when he harbored an anti-Unionist, Şabân Efendi, in his palace in the aftermath of the 1913 coup d'état. Mahmud Şevket Pasha obtained an arrest warrant for the man, and had Vahdeddin's palace surrounded. Vahdeddin did not consent to the soldiers entering his palace, saying he would shoot dead anyone who attempted to enter in order to arrest an innocent man taking refuge in his palace. He was able to facilitate Şaban's escape to Egypt. Vahdeddin's attitude greatly infuriated Şevket Pasha, and their dispute could only be mulled over by Abdul Mejid's mediation. Nevertheless, under the Unionist dictatorship, Vahdeddin's happy-go-lucky life in Çengelköy moved on, save for the spies and surveillance officers which were reporting his activities to the CUP's Central Committee.

There was a quiet rivalry with his half-brother Crown Prince İzzeddin and he repeatedly requested that Mehmed V retract İzzeddin as heir apparent. In the end İzzeddin unexpectedly committed suicide on 1 February 1916, putting Vahdeddin on track to succeed his brother upon his death.

== Harem ==
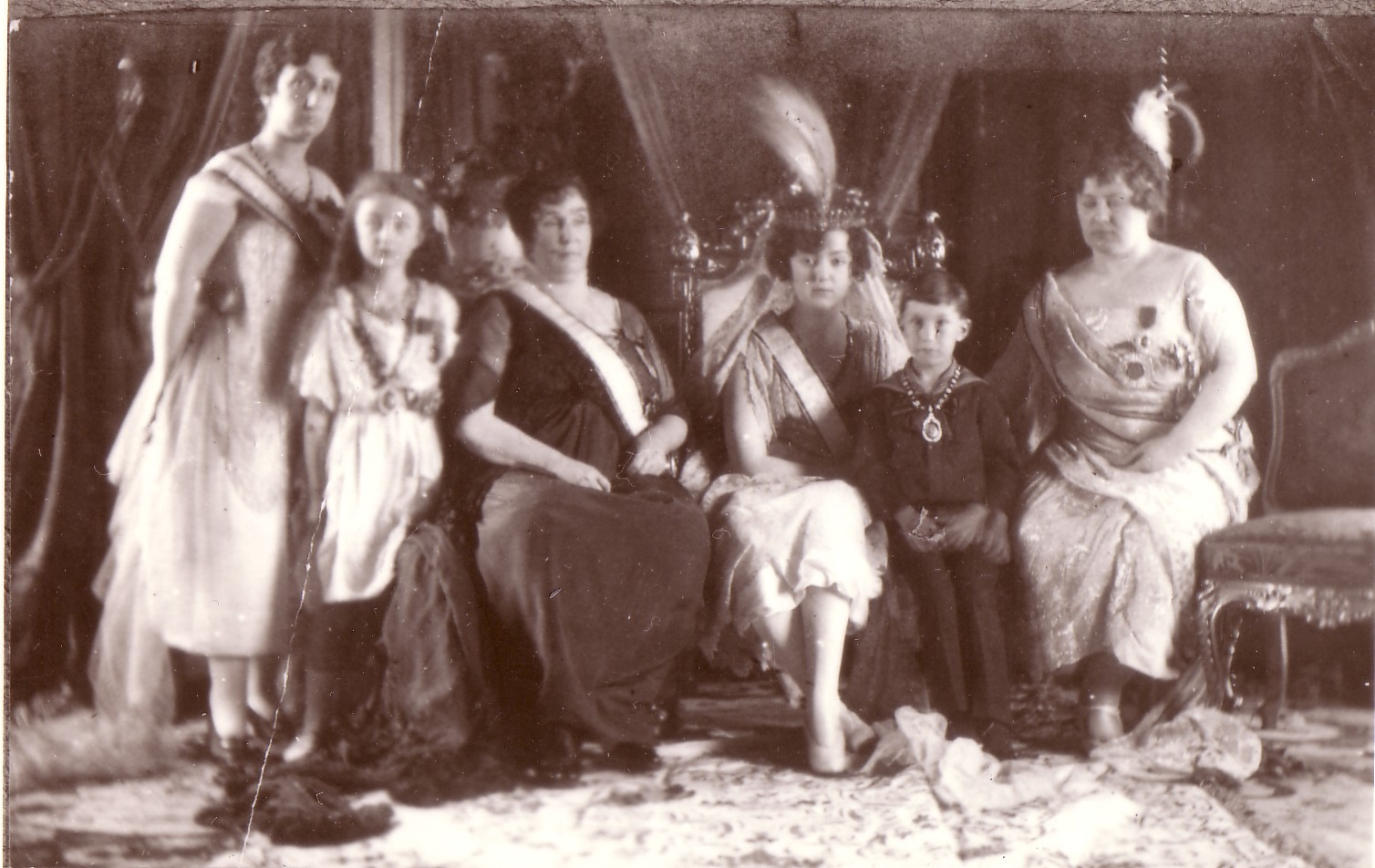
Sabiha Sultana’s wedding day in 1920, left to right: Ulviye Sultana, Dürrüşehvar Sultana, Nazikeda Kadınefendi, Sabiha, Mehmed Ertuğrul Efendi, Şehsuvar Hanımefendi

One day in 1884, Vahdeddin visited his half-sister Cemile Sultana, where he discovered one of her ladies-in-waiting, Emine Nazikeda Hanım, an Abkhaz noblewomen from the Marshan family. It was love at first sight. But when he asked Cemile for Emine's hand in marriage, she flat out refused, for she treated Nazikeda like a daughter, and thought her company was irreplaceable during her daughter's tragic bout with tuberculosis. After more than a year pleading with Cemile she finally gave her blessing on the condition she would be Vahdeddin's only wife. Vahdeddin and Nazikeda's marriage was held on 8 June 1885. The couple was popular among the high society. They lived in one of the palaces of Feriye, but when it was destroyed in a fire they moved to the Çengelköy Pavilion. They enjoyed horseback riding together in the wilderness of their estate. Their first daughter was born three years after their marriage: Fenire Sultana, who died a few weeks later. They had two daughters that survived to adulthood: Fatma Ulviye Sultana (1892–1967), and Rukiye Sabiha Sultana (1894–1971), who were gifted mansions known as the Twin Palaces in Nişantaşı. After Sabiha's birth Nazikeda was informed by doctors that she could not have any more children.

Even though Vahdeddin was far in the line of succession, he wanted a son on the off chance he could become Sultan and change the succession law to agnatic primogeniture. He took new wives with the consent of Nazikeda, breaking his oath to Cemile after 20 years of monogamy. In 1905 he married İnşirah Hanım but this marriage was not happy and he permitted her a divorce in 1909. In 1912 Şehzade Mehmed Ertuğrul was born from his second consort: Müveddet Kadın (m. 1911). In 1918 he married Nevvare Hanım – Müveddet's niece. Vahdeddin did not have a harem in Çengelköy, so when he moved to Dolmabahçe Palace and Yıldız, he chose to keep some of Mehmed V's kalfas and servants instead of establishing a new harem. One of these kalfas was Nevzad Hanım, who he married, but never gave her a title. Controversy surrounded the marriage due to their age difference and because the wedding was held in the middle of the grueling Battle of the Sakarya.

When he did ascend to the throne in 1918, Vahdeddin's biological and adoptive mothers (Gülistû and Şâyeste) – who could have become Valide Sultanas – were already dead, leaving Nazikeda the most prominent lady of the court. Vahdeddin bestowed upon her the title BaşKadın and she was known as "The Last Empress".

== Crown prince ==
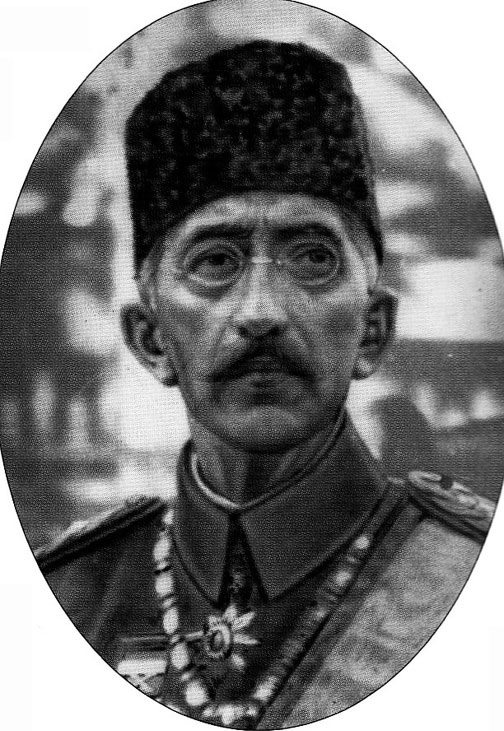
1916 portrait

As Veliahd he represented Mehmed V at the funeral of the Austro-Hungarian emperor Franz Joseph I in 1916. CUP leader Talât, ever suspicious of the Crown Prince, was concerned by his surprisingly amicable conduct at the funeral.

When he was invited by Kaiser Wilhelm II of Germany to make a state visit in 1917, he was accompanied by his aide-de-camp, Mustafa Kemal Pasha (Atatürk). The two first met on 13 December 1917. Kemal Pasha was on leave after resigning from the Yıldırım Army Group command due to his conflict with Erich von Falkenhayn, and received the invitation to accompany the crown prince from Enver Pasha. Colonel Naci invited Mustafa Kemal to meet the heir apparent at his palace. Kemal left the palace unimpressed by the heir apparent. When they departed from the rail station the next day Kemal had to remind him to wave to the guard of honor. On the train, he was invited to another audience with Vahdeddin which turned into a fruitful conversation in which Vahdeddin thanked Kemal for his services in the Gallipoli campaign. The tour encompassed Bad Kreuznach, Strasbourg, Colmar, Essen and Berlin. On the way back from Berlin, Kemal advised Vahdeddin to request a field command and offered to serve as his chief of staff if he wanted to boost his popularity. The crown prince demurred at this request, giving the excuse that the CUP government would refuse. On the other hand, writing of this first encounter Vahdeddin described Mustafa Kemal as loyal and having a bright mind, who was fiercely anti-German and critical of Enver Pasha. Six years later, Mustafa Kemal declared a republic after deposing Sultan Vahdeddin in 1922.

== Enthronement ==
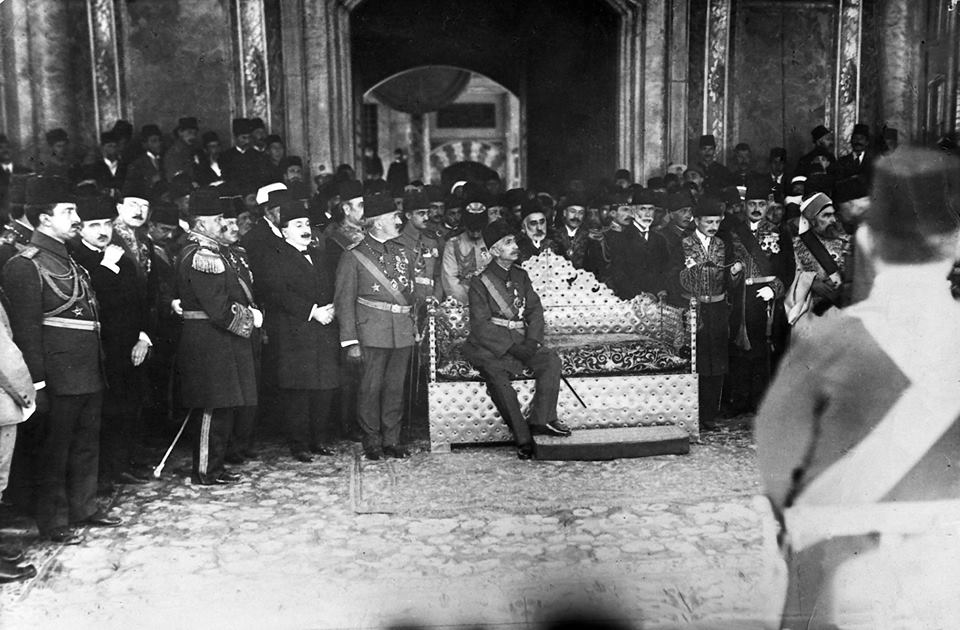
Mehmed VI's cülûs ceremony, where he was girded the Sword of Osman

On 3 June 1918, Talât Pasha, now the Grand Vizier, called Vahdeddin to tell him of Sultan Mehmed V's death. Even though he was the crown prince and entitled to become the new Sultan as the eldest male of the Ottoman family, he was greatly shaken by the news and did not immediately accept his entitlement over the call. Later that day Talât, Enver, and Hayri, the Sheikh-ul-Islam, visited Vahdettin in his palace. He again wavered over becoming Sultan, suggesting they should focus on his half-brother's funeral, raising anxieties among the Unionists about a constitutional crisis. Following a long night of contemplation, prayer, and even some sleep, Vahdeddin let Talât know he was ready to become Sultan during the funeral. They held an enthronement ceremony at Topkapı Palace. He delivered an oath to the National Assembly and to the Constitution, and he took the regal name Mehmed VI, though like his predecessor he was known by the people, and in modern Turkey, by his more distinct name, Vahdeddin. He held his sword girding ceremony on 31 August.

== Reign ==
=== Beginning of his reign ===
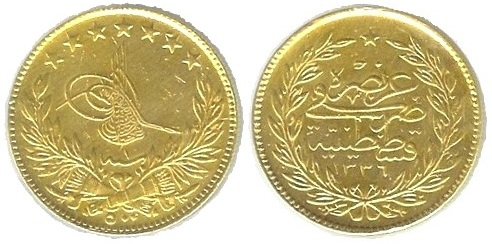
500 kuruş gold coin of Mehmed VI, struck in Constantinople in 1336 [AH] (1918 AD)

Mehmed Vahdettin ascended to the throne at the age of fifty-seven with little experience in statecraft at possibly the worst possible moment to become an Ottoman sultan. He described his situation the following: "I did not sit on a feathered throne but upon the ashes of fire." He was not at all prepared for the crises he had to tackle in his reign; the Great War was going poorly for Turkey and her allies and he would soon oversee the empire's surrender and sure dissolution. In addition, the last few Sultans had a bad track record ruling the empire: his uncle Abdul Aziz was deposed and died in suspicious circumstances, Murad V and Abdul Hamid II were also deposed, and Mehmed V never could wield power. He later wrote that he decided to become Sultan because he believed it was his national duty and he did not trust Abdul Mejid, but that this decision was a mistake. Sabiha recounted how she, her nurse, and her mother could not hold back their tears as they moved to the Dolmabahçe Palace, and had to be admonished by the foremen and eunuchs to compose themselves otherwise entering the palace may bring bad luck. Though he detested the Unionists and was ideologically an absolutist, for four months he had to maintain the Sultanate's subservience to the CUP, and the de-jure constitutional monarchy. Vahdeddin reappointed Talât Pasha as Grand Vizier for another term. This awkward fact aside, he was happy to allow the Unionists to take responsibility for their crimes, troubles, and mishaps, and for now there were not too many problems between him and the CUP.

Mustafa Kemal's first audience with Vahdeddin as Sultan was on 5 August 1918, where he implored his sovereign to dismiss Enver Pasha as Deputy Commander-in-Chief and hinted that he should be his chief of staff, to which Vahdeddin gave vague and non-committal replies. Several more audiences of this nature later, and Kemal understood he was going nowhere. At some point he asked Vahdeddin for Princess Sabiha's hand in marriage, but he warned him off, telling him that she loved someone else (likely Prince Ömer Faruk). He was soon assigned to take command again of Seventh Army on the crumbling Syrian front by the Sultan himself, but Kemal suspected this assignment was orchestrated by Enver. All of his meetings with Sultan Vahdeddin came to crooked fruition when the Sultan took the title of Commander in Chief himself and installed his son-in-law İsmail Hakkı Pasha chief of a private staff organization attached to Yıldız Palace, but at least he was a graduate of the Prussian War Academy. Mustafa Kemal soon understood after arriving at his command that his troops, demoralized, deserting, and badly under-equipped, stood no chance of repelling a British attack. Three weeks later on 19 September, the British attacked in the Battle of Megiddo and smashed through the Turkish lines. Perhaps as a way to motivate him, Vahdeddin made Mustafa Kemal Pasha his honorary aid-de-camp the next day. Over the course of October, one major Levantine city after another fell to the British, while Constantinople attempted to negotiate ceasefire terms. With the tides of war turning against Turkey, Talât Pasha would resign, allowing Vahdeddin to appoint a new Grand Vizier. More significantly, the fall of Talât and defeat in the war lead to the disintegration of the CUP, whose leaders fled the country and dissolved itself as an organization by 1 November 1918.

Vahdeddin's first choice as premier was his in-law Ahmed Tevfik Pasha, an elderly Hamidian that everyone objected to and could not present a government, so he dropped the matter. He was eventually persuaded to assign the task of forming a government to Ahmed İzzet Pasha, who assembled a cabinet of anti-war Unionists. Mustafa Kemal, who was gunning for the War Ministry, was excluded from the new cabinet, as were any minorities. The Sultan strongly demanded his Grand Vizier send Damat Ferid Pasha to negotiate an armistice with the British, but İzzet and other statesmen thought of him as a quack, and categorically refused Vahdeddin's request. He instead dispatched Hüseyin Rauf (Orbay), a famous naval officer with Anglophile leanings, and Major General Charles Townshend, a British officer who had been captured by the Turks, to parley with the British on the battleship HMS Agamemnon. Vahdeddin insisted the delegation prioritize the protection of the Caliphate, Sultanate, and Ottoman dynasty over British demands on Ottoman provinces. İzzet had to remind him that they were simply signing an armistice, not a peace settlement.

Rauf reluctantly signed the Armistice of Mudros. He and Mehmed VI recognized the potentially harsh cease fire terms, but thought it a prudent step in order to regain the lost trust with Britain. Rauf himself believed the many loopholes of the terms would not be exploited due to his trust in English diplomatic credit and Admiral Calthorpe. Instead, the allies exploited Article VII to continue occupying more Ottoman territory, to much dismay from Ottoman Anglophiles. Writing of the armistice terms during his exile, Vahdeddin believed Rauf Bey, who later became a Prime Minister of the Ankara government, to be responsible for the ensuing crisis, and Mustafa Kemal for aggravating it.

=== Ruling in force ===
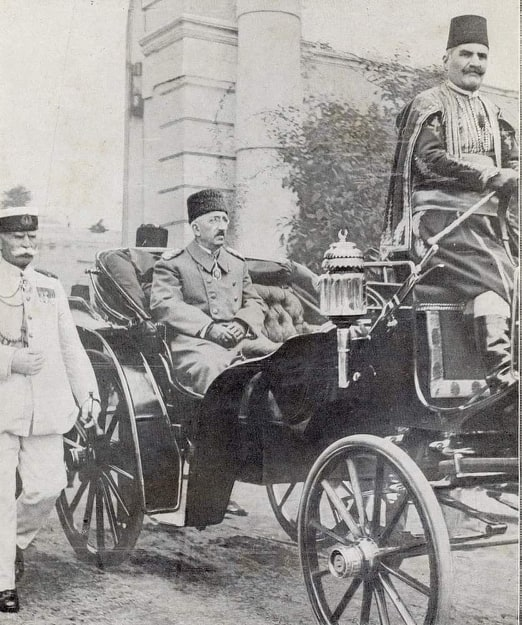
Riding the royal carriage

The First World War was a disaster for the Ottoman Empire. Turkey's entry into the war was initiated by the CUP dictatorship. British and Allied forces captured Baghdad, Damascus, and Jerusalem during the war, resulting in a defeated Turkey set to be partitioned amongst the Allies. Now dealing with an existential crisis over the Turkish state, Sultan Mehmed VI was prepared to offer Britain and France the traditional policy of close cooperation in order to rehabilitate Turkey into the international community and sign a lighter peace treaty – or as he call it: friendship with Britain, closeness with France. However this strategy did not turn out to be successful, as despite the leadership change, the Allies considered the participation of Turkey during the Great War – and its trend in the last decade towards political instability – akin to a rogue state that deserved punishment. Therefore, Entente statesmen sought to elevate Greece as a responsible Eastern Mediterranean Great Power in Turkey's place.

Domestically, the wars end and the CUP's collapse and discreditation represented a power vacuum, and an opportunity for Vahdeddin to reassert the Sultanate and purge the Unionists. However Vahdeddin's program – peace by all means necessary – was ill-conceived and unpopular, while his governments lacked cohesion and he himself had bad political acumen. The Sultan and his government would be trapped between the demands of the Allies and the demands of neo-Unionist Turkish Nationalists. Though he may have had little room to maneuver in foreign affairs, he squandered the mandate given to him in domestic affairs, which lead to his deposition.

Mehmed VI witnessed many of the monarchies of Europe experiencing their demise or extreme shakeup with the end of the Great War. The German Hohenzollerns, Austrian Habsburgs, and Russian Romanovs all met their end due to the Great War, and Greece and Bulgaria's monarchies also experienced great instability due to the war. The highest priority for Vahdeddin was to safeguard his dynasty's interests, which soon came into conflict with his country's national interest. He hoped to rely on Grand Viziers that were connected to the royal family by marriage ties. Damat Ferid Pasha was Vahdeddin's brother-in-law, or imperial damat, being married to his full-sister Mediha Sultana. Vahdeddin did not have a good relationship with his damat, but appointed him as Grand Vizier five times due to his supposedly good relations with the British. Ahmed Tevfik Pasha was his in-law through his son İsmail Hakkı's marriage to Vahdeddin's daughter Ulviye Sultana. He was a capable, though elderly, Hamidian statesman, who often had to "clean up" Ferid's mess.

=== Armistice era ===
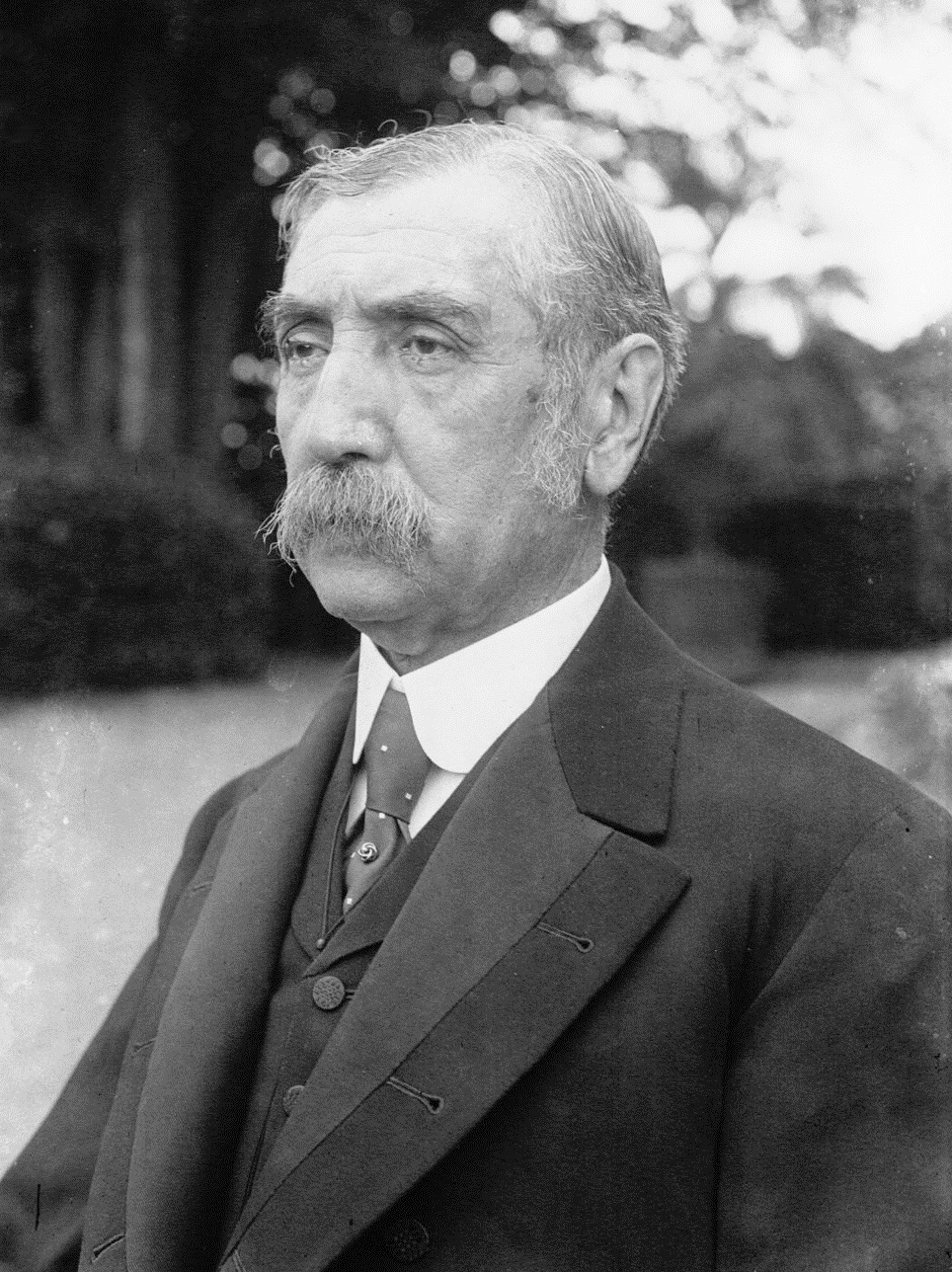
Damat Ferid Pasha, Vahdeddin's brother-in-law and five times appointed Grand Vizier

Sultan Vahdeddin soon requested the resignation of İzzet, which was unconstitutional, and assigned Tevfik Pasha to form a government, who he wanted in the first place. Two days later, the allies occupied Istanbul, though Tevfik Pasha was able to receive a vote of confidence from a disgruntled parliament afterwards. Over time, Vahdeddin disliked the sight of the massive Allied fleet anchored in the Bosphorus from Dolmabahçe Palace and retired to Yıldız Palace, passing Dolmabahçe to Crown Prince Abdul Mejid. In his speech for the opening of the new legislative year of the parliament, Vahdeddin wished for peace along the lines of Woodrow Wilson's Fourteen Points, with the appropriate honour and dignity of the state.

The question which immediately dominated Turkey was the fate of the war criminals and the profiteers of stolen Armenian property. He made a press statement absolving the Ottoman people of collective guilt, stating that the CUP was solely responsible for the war and its excesses, such as the Armenian genocide. He requested his government to establish tribunals to try war criminals. The Chamber of Deputies, dominated by Unionists elected back in 1914, obstructed the agenda; they objected that only the chamber had the authority to establish special tribunals. Vahdeddin was initially reluctant to dissolve the body despite its age and composition since it would signal the loss of Arabia, Palestine, Syria, and Mesopotamia to Allied occupation. When it seemed the Chamber was drawing up a motion to censure Tevfik, Vahdeddin and the Grand Vizier opted to dissolve the Chamber on 21 December 1918. He said in his announcement he was doing the bidding of British Occupation Forces. The Sultan postponed elections until a peace treaty could be signed on the grounds that the country was under occupation, even though they were constitutionally mandated to occur four months after a parliament's dissolution.

Sultan Vahdeddin asked Tevfik Pasha to resign and assigned him to form a new government in order to purge Unionist sympathizers from the government. The jailbreak and suicide of Reşid Bey, "the Butcher of Diyarbekir" (25 January 1919), renewed British interest in prosecuting war criminals. Britain cooperated with the Turkish government in these arrest campaigns, though controversially demanded extradition of some criminals. British and French demands on war criminals increasingly mounted on the Tevfik Pasha government, and after the Sultan complained about the lack of progress on the matter after more than three months, he resigned, and Damad Ferid Pasha was appointed Grand Vizier on 4 March 1919.

A new government, consisting of members of the Freedom and Accord Party, arrested the leaders of the CUP, including a former grand vizier, Said Halim Pasha. The trial of Boğazlıyan District Governor Mehmed Kemal Bey was quickly concluded. He was sentenced to death and publicly hanged in Beyazıt Square after the fatwa was signed by the Sultan. This did not go over well with Turks and he was declared a national martyr. Efforts to repair the government's relationship with Greeks and Armenians were ultimately doomed when in March 1919 their respective patriarchates announced the dissolution of their flocks' status as Ottoman citizens. Ferid Pasha was initially unable to send a Turkish delegation to the Paris Peace Conference, and the Allies increased interference in government. To calm the situation at home and shore up his popularity, Vahdeddin dispatched Commissions of Admonition [Heyât-i Nasîha] to Anatolia and Rumelia, delegations representing the imperial family headed by royal princes.

On 15 May 1919, after receiving the necessary support from the Allies, Greece landed an occupation force in Izmir, which inflamed sectarian tensions in Turkey. This began the Greco-Turkish War. In order to calm nationalist tempers, the Sultan had Ferid, who had resigned following the Greek Occupation of Izmir, form his second government on 19 May, which included ten nationalist ministers without portfolio unaffiliated with political parties or the palace. Twenty-three jailed nationalists, whose trials had already been postponed were released. The Sultan sent a message to the British High Commissioner Admiral Calthorpe where he complained that Greek atrocities had "turned Aydın into a slaughterhouse". He warned Calthorpe of the wrath of the Anatolian people should Greek excesses continue. Damat Ferid convened a Sultanic Council [Şûrâ-yi Saltanat], a faux parliament akin to an estates general, to formulate a response to the Greek occupation of Izmir. The delegates concluded the council demanding complete independence and the establishment of an emergency national council. Though the government did not implement the council's recommendations, in response the Allies extradited sixty-seven prisoners from the Bekir Ağa Division to Malta, making them the first of the Malta exiles.

=== Mustafa Kemal's assignment ===
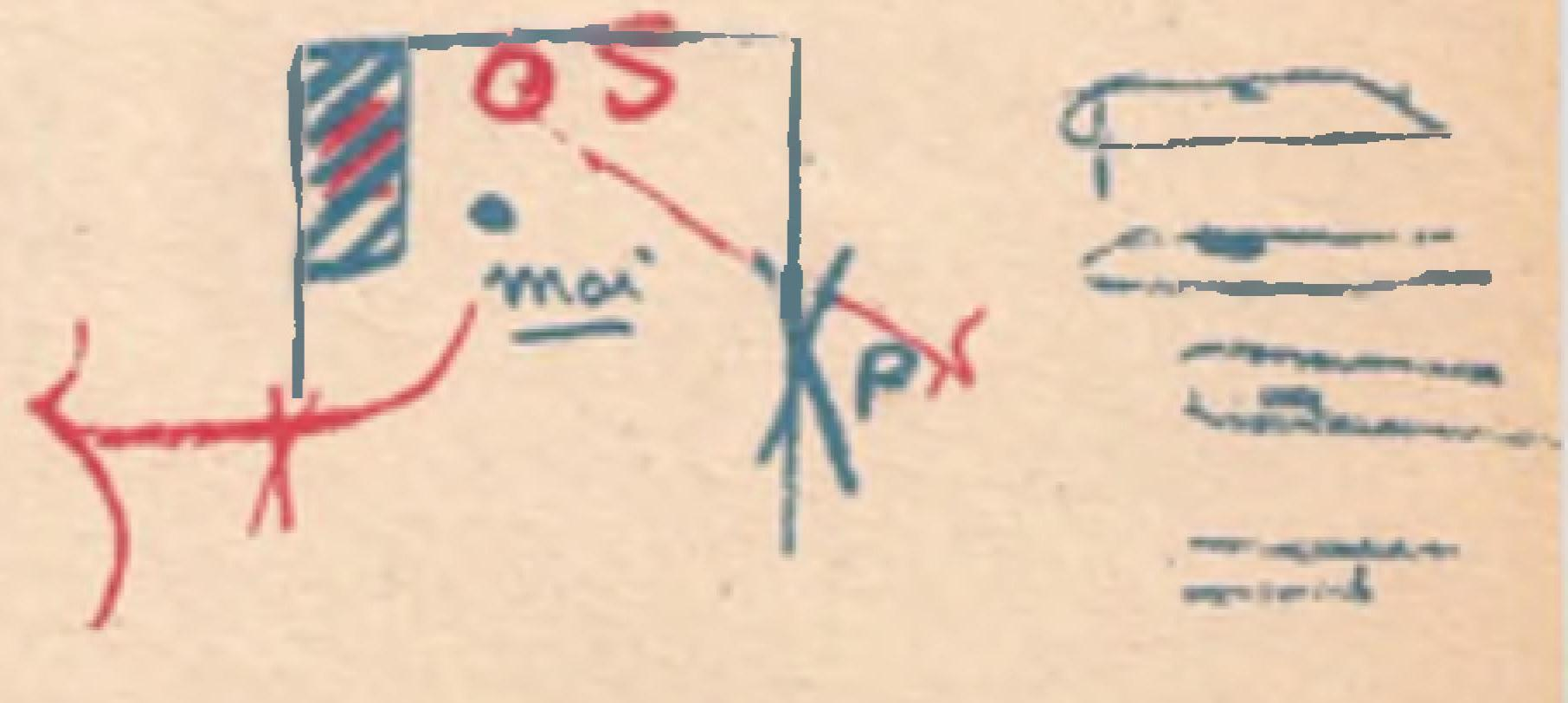
Mustafa Kemal's sketch of his last audience with Sultan Vahdeddin at Dolmabahçe Palace. Kemal was the dot marked "moi" in front of the red circle marked "S" for Sultan, who was watching the Allied warships anchored in view outside the window

By the end of the war, conditions in Thrace and Anatolia – by all metrics – were disastrous, to the point where public order collapsed. The Allied Powers allowed officers to be assigned to the army to ensure public order and demobilize the army. On 30 April 1919 Mustafa Kemal Pasha was assigned to the Ninth Army Troops Inspectorate, a wide-ranging responsibility which effectively gave him civil and administrative authority over all of Anatolia. No subject of an Ottoman Sultan received such a delegation of powers since Köprülü Mehmed Pasha in the 1650s. Mustafa Kemal was a popular, competent, and ambitious general who fought with distinction in the Gallipoli campaign and since the armistice had attempted to capitalize on his fame. Though he was a Unionist, he had poor relations with CUP leaders and was annoyingly isolated from power. He was also outraged by the bad faith of the allied powers, and secretly believed drastic actions had to be taken to secure Turkish independence in the face of Western imperialism. In the lead up to this assignment, Kemal and the Sultan reconnected and held several audiences. Vahdeddin was attempting to gauge the loyalty of the military, Kemal wrote later that this singular concern gave him a feeling of hopelessness. Kemal also held several meetings with the Grand Vizier, Damat Ferid Pasha, and it is perhaps because of these meetings he was not caught up in the first waves of arrests of Unionists and war criminals.

According to Mustafa Kemal his last audience with the Sultan was in Yıldız Palace on 15 May. At the end of the audience, as he was gifted a golden watch with the Sultan's monogram, Vahdeddin was said to have excitedly let Kemal know that he "can save the state" in his mission. This left Kemal shocked that the Sultan implicitly hoped for him to indeed establish a nationalist resistance. However Vahdeddin never wrote of a meeting like this occurring, and his later actions, declarations, and justifications show that Kemal did not manifest any implicit intention of his. No funds were provided for his mission besides a small secret sum from Interior Minister Mehmed Ali.

The lead up to Kemal's departure filled the capital with tension. British officers stationed in the city distributing visas for Mustafa Kemal's party noticed his mission included many more officers and personnel necessary than an inspectorate would need. Instead of three or four people, he intended his party to include thirty-five officers. Liaison officer John Godolphin Bennett, reading the names of the officers, believed Kemal intended to wage war. These concerns were relayed to High Commissioner Rumbolt, who assured him that he trusted the Sultan, who in turn trusted Kemal. On 16 May 1919, Kemal and nineteen officers out of the thirty-five he hoped to join him left early with the news of Izmir's occupation (See Mustafa Kemal Atatürk's voyage to Samsun). Once he arrived in Samsun on 19 May 1919, out of the reaches of Istanbul and without the Sultan's permission, Kemal indeed used his extraordinary powers to coordinate a nationalist resistance with like minded officers, which led to British demands for his recall.

=== Initial clashes with Mustafa Kemal ===
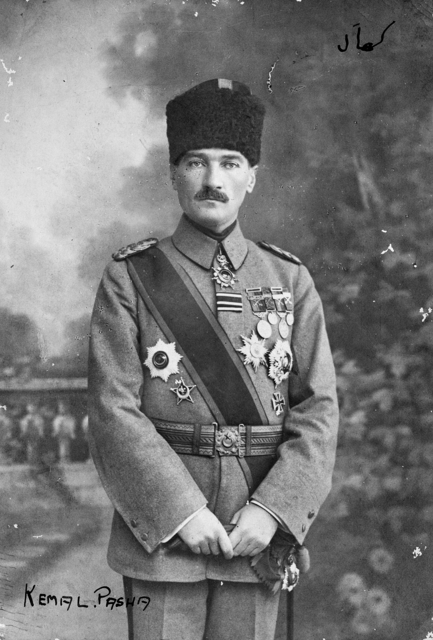
Mustafa Kemal Pasha (Atatürk) with his Great War medals, leader of the Turkish nationalist movement and responsible for Vahdettin's downfall

The Sultan was indifferent to his activities until late June. Though the government announced Mustafa Kemal's cashiering from the army on 23 June, Vahdeddin preferred to remain silent. In a conversation on the night of 8–9 July 1919 over telegram with Kemal, who was in Erzurum, Vahdeddin stated that the British wanted him to come to Istanbul immediately and that they had given him a guarantee that they would not treat the general dishonorably. In a second telegram he sent without waiting for the reply to the previous telegram, he announced that Mustafa Kemal Pasha had been dismissed from his duty as the Third Army Inspector (position since renamed) and that he should return to Istanbul. Mustafa Kemal Pasha simultaneously announced his resignation from the army and that he was ready to continue the struggle as a civilian.

By the summer of 1919, the Allies finally decided to invite a Turkish delegation to the Paris Peace Conference, which coincided with the commencement of the trial and arrest of the Unionists once again. The Sultan demanded Tevfik accompany Damad Ferid Pasha, who headed the delegation, as he did not trust the Grand Vizier. His presentation of the Turkish position to the conference, effectively demanding status quo ante bellum, produced shock and ridicule from the Allied representatives, discrediting Istanbul's diplomatic position and shuttering Turkey from the peace negotiations. The Sultan nevertheless reappointed him Grand Vizier after his resignation upon returning from Paris, hoping that stacking his cabinet with even more nationalist ministers could unite the country and minimize the influence of Mustafa Kemal's burgeoning movement. Ferid issued a circular opposing the proceedings of the Erzurum Congress (23 July). When the Erzurum Congress convened under the presidency of Mustafa Kemal Pasha anyway, it began its work by sending a telegram of loyalty to the Sultan, and a telegram criticizing the Grand Vizier's circular.

After a long struggle instigated by British pressure, Ferid was able to obtain an arrest warrant for Mustafa Kemal Pasha and Rauf Bey on 29 July. Abdul Mejid, who had nationalist sympathies, stormed the palace and criticized the Sultan for blindly supporting Damad Ferid Pasha and his pro-British policy, to the point of insult. Ferid had few friends and many enemies, one of whom was the crown prince. The Sultan's continued reliance on Ferid prompted Abdul Mejid to correspond independently with Allied leaders and send letters of advice to his cousin, one of which was to push back in the negotiations for peace terms. Abdul Mejid wrote a memorandum to the Sultan which he subsequently leaked to the press calling for cooperation between the government with the nationalists. In a telegram to XV Corps, Mustafa Kemal would later downplay the Veliahd's memorandum as claims not to be taken seriously.

With a decree Ferid had the Sultan personally sign, all of Mustafa Kemal Pasha's decorations were withdrawn and his honorary rank of aide-de-camp to the Sultan was also abolished. İzzet and Tevfik would resign from Ferid's cabinet over this. The government was again unsuccessful in dispersing the Sivas Congress (4–11 September 1919). Upon its conclusion, Mustafa Kemal began the Telegram War by instructing provincial officials to cut communications with Istanbul until they give in to Sivas' demands, the National Pact being one of them. Within a month, every governor in Anatolia and Thrace, save Istanbul, pledged allegiance to Kemal's movement. Damat Ferid Pasha's government collapsed, and on 2 October Ali Rıza Pasha, a general with nationalist credentials, was brought to the premiership and signed the Amasya Protocol with the nationalists, a document meant to coordinate resistance against the Allied powers between the Istanbul government and the Turkish nationalists. Vahdeddin was unhappy to have been forced to compromise with what he thought were unreconstructed Unionists rebelling against a rightful monarch.

=== Detente with the nationalists ===
In the 1919 general election, held as part of the Amasya Protocol, Mustafa Kemal's Association for the Defence of Rights of Anatolia and Rumelia won an uncontested victory. The Sultan did not attend the opening of the legislative session, citing his illness as an excuse.

Despite the appearances of national unity, the Sultan would always believe that the Turkish nationalists surrounding Mustafa Kemal were Unionists (most members of the movement, including Mustafa Kemal, were previously members of the CUP) whose acts of futile resistance were resuming a destructive conflict counterproductive to peace. This disrespect was mutual, Kemal thought of Vahdeddin as naïve and incompetent whose attempt at a diplomatic solution invited bad faith from the allies. Never-the-less, he maintained the political fiction that the Sultan's actions were done under duress of foreigners and manipulative courtiers, and he needed to be rescued. Vahdeddin considered the nationalists’ seizure of the country's administration as a rebellion, based on the fact that the Sultan's prerogatives were no longer absolute. He believed that it was out of the question for a sovereign to compromise and negotiate with rebels. The nationalists imploring him to escape from Istanbul to Bursa or Ankara was also offensive to the Sultan, as it was believed it would make a compelling excuse for Greece or the Allies to press a claim on the imperial capital. Meeting the British High Commissioner Horace Rumbold, he said that Mustafa Kemal Pasha was "a revolutionary... Bekir Sami is a Circassian. They are all the same... My government, unfortunately, is powerless against them."

=== Conflict with the nationalist movement ===
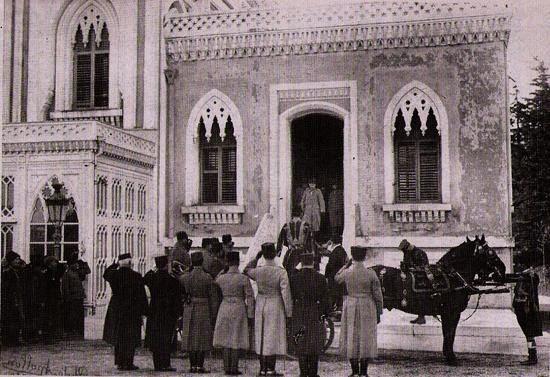
Mehmed VI exiting Yıldız Mosque

After the military occupation of Istanbul (16 March 1920), an unpopular action the Sultan had to accept under duress, Vahdeddin reported that he received the Allies' pronouncement with sorrow. He said that he had always desired cooperation with the Allied Powers, that he was relieved by the arrest of certain nationalist leaders in Istanbul, and that if the allies had not made such a decision, he would have had to do it himself. He expressed his appreciation for their guarantees to his own royal prerogatives.

The Salih Hulusi government was forced to resign because it did not accept the Allied powers’ demands to condemn the nationalists (2 April). It was understood that Damat Ferid Pasha was due to return as Grand Vizier. The deputy president of the Chamber of Deputies, Hüseyin Kâzım Bey, stated that appointing Ferid as Grand Vizier without receiving a solid guarantee from the British would be a disaster for the country and the sultanate. This angered the Sultan who said, "If I wanted, I could give the office of Grand Vizier to the Greek or the Armenian Patriarch, or to the Chief Rabbi!" and assigned Ferid to form a government for the fourth time (5 April). Under pressure from the British, fatwas were issued declaring that the nationalists were infidels to be killed, and defection from Istanbul was punishable by death. A counter-fatwa was later issued by Rifat Börekçi and 147 religious scholars in Ankara, declaring the nationalists' struggle against imperialism legitimate and divinely sanctioned. Istanbul's response to this was to sentence Mustafa Kemal Pasha and five of his comrades to death in a martial law court, a decision signed by the Sultan. These announcements sparked civil war in Anatolia when anti-Kemalists rose up in the Sultan's name against Ankara. An army formation, the Army of the Caliphate, was also raised to crush the nationalist forces, which failed miserably and only delivered a financial crisis to the government's coffers.

The Sultan dissolved the Chamber of Deputies and suspended the constitution, adopting personal rule and formally ending the Second Constitutional Era, though it was practically not in effect since 1912. On 23 April 1920, the Grand National Assembly was established in Ankara and declared itself the sole legitimate government of Turkey. A great religious ceremony was held upon its establishment in which Vahdeddin's name was called from the minarets of the provincial town, continuing the fiction of the captive monarch undertaking actions under duress. A few days later Mustafa Fevzi Pasha (Çakmak) defected to Ankara and delivered a speech, noting that his defection was encouraged by Sultan Vahdeddin in order to keep communication open between Istanbul and Ankara. Afterwards, a telegram of allegiance was sent to the Sultan, and the new parliament announced that the national resistance was being carried out to rescue the captive Sultan. This created a diarchy in Turkey: the Sultan's government in Istanbul and the Nationalist government in Ankara, a situation Greece, Armenia, France, and Britain hoped to exploit.

In a speech to the Grand National Assembly, Mustafa Kemal said the following of Sultan Mehmed VI's legitimacy as a Caliph:

“..Istanbul is officially and effectively occupied by the enemy. Today, there is no difference between saying Istanbul and saying London. Unfortunately, in Istanbul, which is like London, our Caliph, to whom the entire Islamic world is devoted, and our Sultan, the most precious legacy of our great ancestors, has remained."

=== Treaty of Sèvres ===
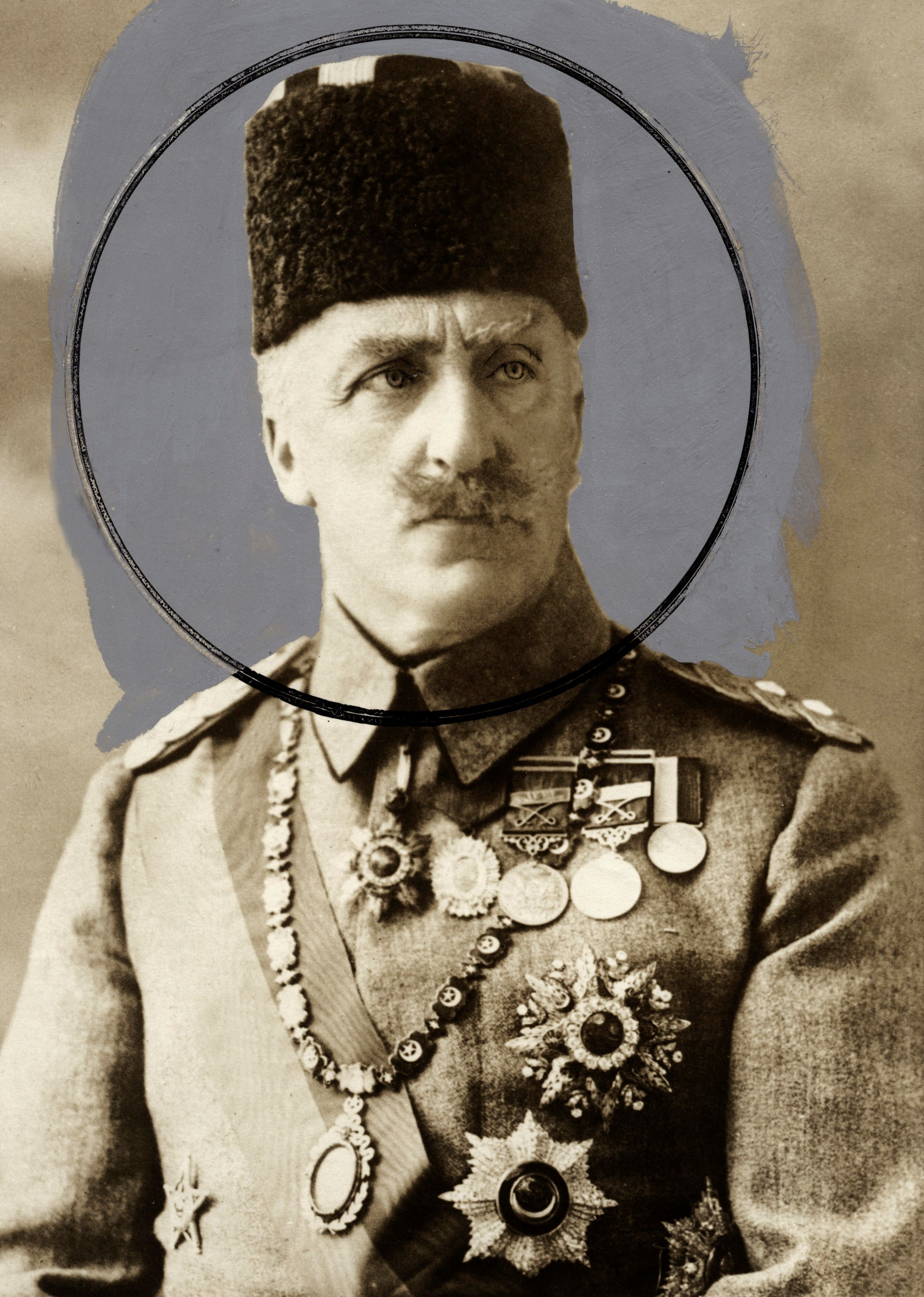
Caliph Abdul Mejid II, who was crown prince during Vahdeddin's reign

Throughout 1918–1920 the Sultan attempted several times to contact the British government through Ferid and his nephew Sami Bey to basically request a protectorate status for the Ottoman Empire under Britain, with the justification of Britain's responsible custodianship of millions of Muslims in its empire. Calthorpe would often be the one to reject these proposals, as the British considered them "diplomatic bribery" and did not think her allies would accept. In the lead up to the presentation of peace proceedings, Vahdeddin sent a telegram to King George V, asking the king to intervene in his government to ease the peace terms. King George replied "The future of Turkey is in the hands of the allied governments."

The Sultan convened the last Sultanate Council of the Ottoman Empire in Yıldız Palace to deliberate over the peace terms, which he described as a "conglomerate of calamities" [mecelle-i mesâib]. The grand vizier reported that it was understood that Istanbul would be fully occupied by Greek troops if the treaty was rejected. The council was unanimous in signing the treaty except for one delegate. With the approval he received from the Sultanate Council, Ferid Pasha shuffled his cabinet to suppress the Turkish nationalist movement in Anatolia and formed his fifth cabinet. Sultan Vahdeddin's representatives signed the Treaty of Sèvres on 10 August 1920. This treaty detached the Arab provinces of Turkey and turned them into countries under British and French mandates, while recognizing British, French, and Italian spheres of influence in Anatolia. Eastern Thrace was to be annexed by Greece which would also control Izmir and Armenia was to be given independence. Though Turkey could nominally keep its capital, a large Allied presence would be stationed in the Turkish straits. Hundreds of articles of the treaty delved into minutia only appropriate for colonies, such as provisions for foreign excavation and archeology, protection of birds useful for agriculture, and bans on pornography. The Ottoman Empire was to remain a rump state in Anatolia under foreign influence, relegating the country as an "uncivilized" state necessary of civilizing initiatives by great powers.

The first murmurs of deposing Vahdeddin in the Grand National Assembly came about in the fall out of Sèvres. In a secret session of the Grand National Assembly, Mustafa Kemal claimed that the Sultan could not be considered a legitimate caliph, and accused him of treason. The signatories of the Treaty of Sèvres, including Damad Ferid Pasha, were sentenced to death by an Independence Tribunal in Ankara. Ankara denounced the rule of Mehmed VI and the command of Süleyman Şefik Pasha, who was in charge of the Army of the Caliphate; as a result, a temporary constitution was drafted for Kemal's counter-government in Ankara.

Around this time Abdul Mejid received an invitation from Mustafa Kemal to come to Ankara to join the nationalists in order to give his movement more legitimacy. But despite his misgivings with Vahdeddin's reliance on Ferid Pasha, Abdul Mejid decided the move would be too risky and could cause a full-scale civil war, putting further distrust of the royal family among the nationalists. Upon this correspondence being found out the government initiated the thirty-eight-day blockade of Dolmabahçe, which was only resolved with British shuttle diplomacy, and ended his relationship with Vahdeddin. Abdul Mejid would be the only member of the Ottoman family to call Vahdeddin a traitor following his exile. Other members of the royal family such as Şehzade Ömer Faruk and İsmail Hakkı were inspired to betray their patriarch and join the nationalists after this incident.

=== Collaboration with Greece (1919–1922) ===
On 20 September 1919, after the Greek occupation of Smyrna, Vahdeddin implored the Turks not to resist and supported further Greek incursions into Anatolia. Kurd Ahmet Izzet Pasha immediately ordered his Ottoman troops to not resist allied and Greek troops under the instruction of his nephew Şerif Pasha. He also ordered them to welcome Greek troops with a special ceremony and respect.

Vahdeddin's Justice Minister, Ali Rüştü Efendi, had already stated in May 1919 that "Prayers will be said for the success of the Greek army", and that "This army is our army". Factions in Istanbul pushed the view that the Greek army was the Caliph's army and had come to protect the rights of the Ottoman Empire. In May 1920, speaking for Mehmed, Ahmet Anzavur noted that "The Sultan does not consent to war against the Greeks. The Greeks are our friends. To take up arms against them, contrary to the Sultan's order and approval, is unbelief (kufr) and rebellion (baghi)".

During the Greek Summer Offensive of 1920, the Kuva-yi Inzibatiye, established by Vahdeddin and the imperial government of the Ottoman Empire, landed in Izmit (Nicomedia) to help the Greeks. At the same time, religious and Turkish civil leaders in Bursa were declaring that the Greek Army was advancing with the permission of "the Caliph" Vahdeddin, allowing Greek troops to occupy the city with no resistance from the Muslim inhabitants. Vahdeddin's Justice Minister, Ali Rüştü Efendi, then stated "Thank God, Bursa has also been included among the provinces liberated by the Greek army". Meanwhile, the Sheikh-ul-Islam of the Ottoman Empire, Mustafa Sabri, noted that "The Greek army is the army of the Caliph. When they come to your town, your village, do not fail to show them respect". A bit later, Sofoklis Venizelos visited and photographed himself in the tomb of Osman I, founder of the Ottoman Empire; he was applauded by the local population, primarily Greek Christians but also Muslim Turks.

After the November 1920 elections and the government change in Greece, little changed. The mufti of Bursa and the head of the city's Freedom and Accord Party branch, Hacı Ömer Feyzi Efendi, wrote a congratulatory letter to King Constantine I of Greece during his visit to Anatolia, respectfully expressing his gratitude for having honored Anatolia with His Majesty's presence. In August 1922, just before the Great Offensive, Vahdeddin said "The nationalist leaders are not a government, but a group of rebels and revolutionaries. They are the revivalists of the Committee of Union and Progress [...] They are nothing but Bolsheviks. My government and I are ready to make peace and make sacrifices in this regard".

=== Lead up to deposition ===
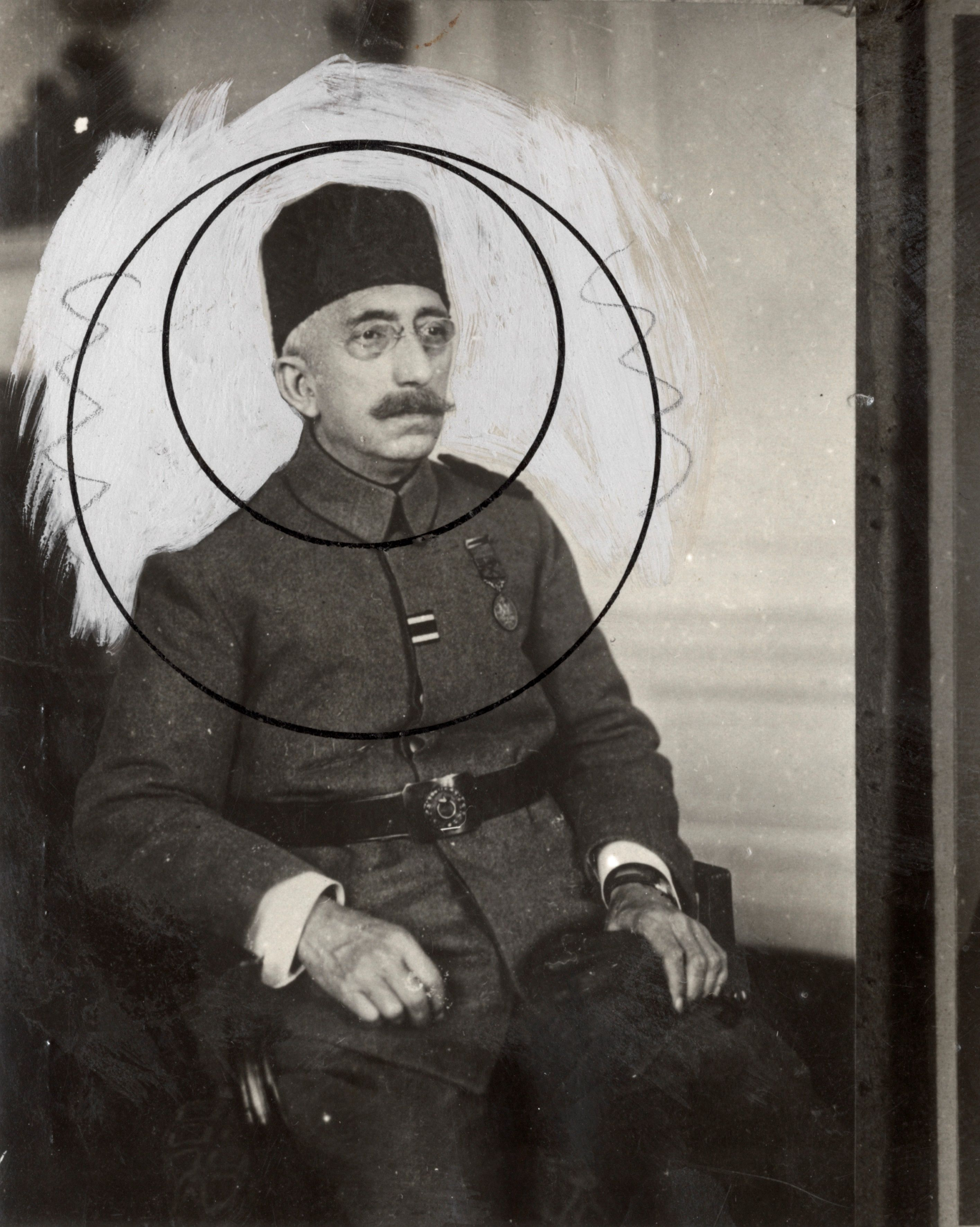
1922 portrait of Mehmed VI

A series of events coincided with the Allies shifting away from Greece. In particular, the fall of Georges Clemenceau in France after the January 1920 French elections, the fall of Eleftherios Venizelos after the November 1920 Greek elections and the return of King Constantine, as well as support for Ankara throughout the Islamic world. The Allies now hoped to draw up a new peace settlement more acceptable for the Turks, and invited Istanbul and Ankara to the Conference of London.

In October 1920, the Allied Powers sent their high commissioners in Istanbul to the Sultan and requested that the government of Ferid be changed for a new government that could reach an agreement with Ankara to implement the treaty. The Sultan reappointed Tevfik Pasha to the premiership, who composed a cabinet made up of ministers sympathetic to the Nationalists. Istanbul once again began a rapprochement with Ankara, though they would be in dispute over which delegation represented the nation. Istanbul's delegation eventually conceded to only represent the interests of the Ottoman dynasty, though this was not enough for Ankara, which wished for sole representation in the negotiations.

A memorandum of understanding was published in January 1921, where Istanbul recognized the Grand National Assembly. Vahdeddin put responsibility of the treaty on Ferid. The newly appointed Grand Visier, Ahmet Tevfik Pasha, suspended the Special War Tribunal for war criminals of the Great War, lifted Mustafa Kemal's death penalty sentence, and pardoned nationalist prisoners. Vahdeddin's Chief of Staff Avni Pasha now sought ways to make Vahdeddin escape the capital to join Kemal in Ankara. But this was as far as he was able to go. Ministers like İzzet, Ali Rıza, and Tevfik advised Vahdeddin against doing so, as there was no guarantee Kemal's movement would succeed and they too had antagonist relationships with him. Avni was pressured to resign. Around early summer 1921, Vahdeddin's nephew Sami Bey organized an escape attempt with the royal yacht Söğüt, only to be confronted on the docks by High Commissioner Rumbold right before he was to fetch the Sultan, reminding him that if he leaves the Allies would evacuate Constantinople too, allowing the Greeks to take sole custody of the city if he fled.

In another secret session of parliament in February 1922, Mustafa Kemal and the delegates discussed the feasibility of dethroning Vahdeddin with the justification that the Sultan had vacated the Caliphate by accepting Sèvres.

== Abolition of the Sultanate ==
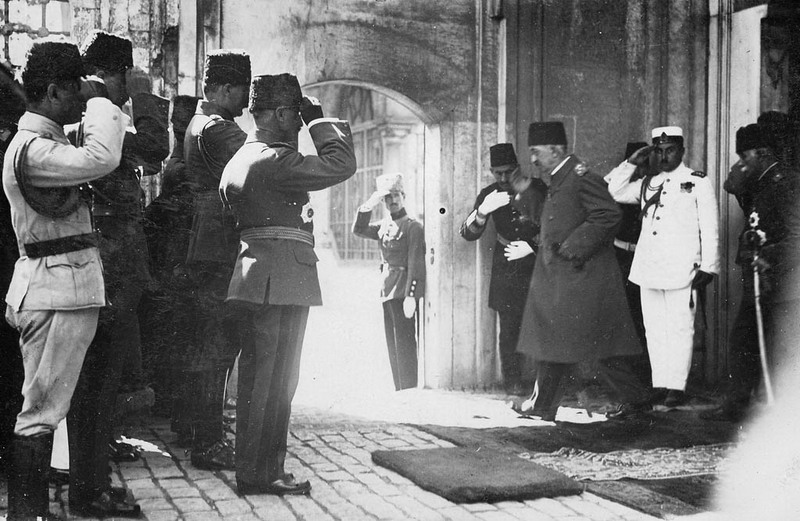
Sultan Vahdeddin departing from the backdoor of the Dolmabahçe Palace

As the nationalist movement strengthened its military positions with the Great Offensive of late August 1922, Mehmed VI, his five wives, and attendants could no longer leave the safety of the palace. On 19 October 1922, after the Armistice of Mudanya ending the Greco-Turkish War, Refet Pasha arrived in Constantinople as an emissary from Ankara to an exuberant city (at least the Muslims were), his mission to unite Turkey under the Ankara government. To one of Tevfik's sons welcoming him on behalf of Vahdeddin, Refet declared his greeting to the Caliph, not the Sultan, and met with Istanbul's ministers on a personal basis, not in an official capacity. Refet gave speeches announcing that sovereignty belonged to people now, no longer Khans, Sultans, and Constitutional Monarchs. In a meeting with İzzet Pasha, Refet informed him that should Istanbul send a delegate to the peace talks to be held in Lausanne, Ankara would quit the talks.

When Refet met with the Sultan and then the Grand Vizier, he requested him to dissolve the Istanbul government and recognize Ankara as Turkey's sole legitimate government. However, they rejected Refet's demand by claiming that he was a constitutional monarch and he could not dissolve the government and he wished for a delegation to represent the interests of the dynasty. When news reached Ankara of Vahdeddin's intransigence the Grand National Assembly voted to separate the offices of Caliphate and Sultanate, abolished the Sultanate, and deposed him as Caliph on 1 November 1922. Vahdeddin told Refet Pasha, who notified him of the decision of the assembly, that a Caliphate could not exist without a Sultan. Eighteen days later Abdul Mejid accepted the Grand National Assembly's election of him as Caliph. Reactions to his deposition were muted.

Newspapers began a press offensive accusing Mehmed VI of treason, and soon the Grand National Assembly voted to put him on trial, though the method would never be determined. With Istanbul ministers resigning from cabinet, in a surprise move Tevfik Pasha resigned the Grand Vizierate, making him the last Grand Vizier of the Ottoman Empire. He did not return the imperial seal and never met with Vahdeddin again. On 5 November Refet announced the liquidation of the Istanbul government. In his memoirs, Vahdeddin accused Tevfik of being an agent of Mustafa Kemal.

When news came of Ali Kemal's lynching the royal family and its supporters panicked. Those who could get visas ran away, those who could not took refuge in British barracks. Vahdeddin was overwhelmed by those who came to the palace asking for money to escape the country, and kept to his harem. On 10 November he attended Friday prayers for the first time after the abolition of the Sultanate, and was not mentioned in the khutbah. With this experience and reading articles attacking him in the press, he decided to flee the country.

== Exile ==
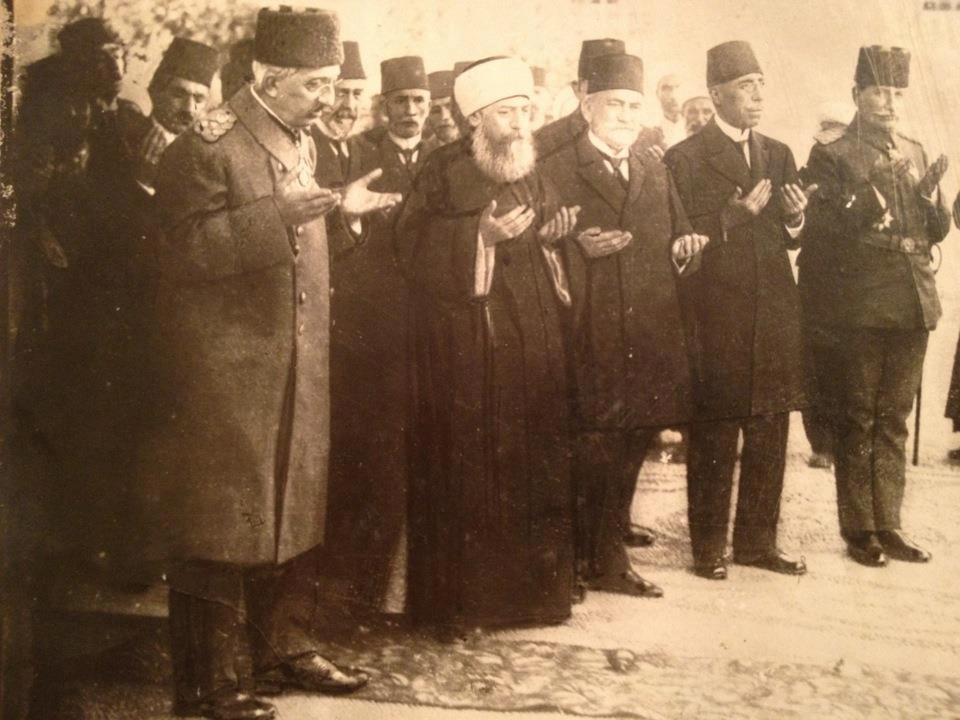
Mehmed VI prays with Shaykh al-Islām Nuri Efendi and Grand Vizier Ahmed Tevfik Pasha before leaving Istanbul, 17 November 1922

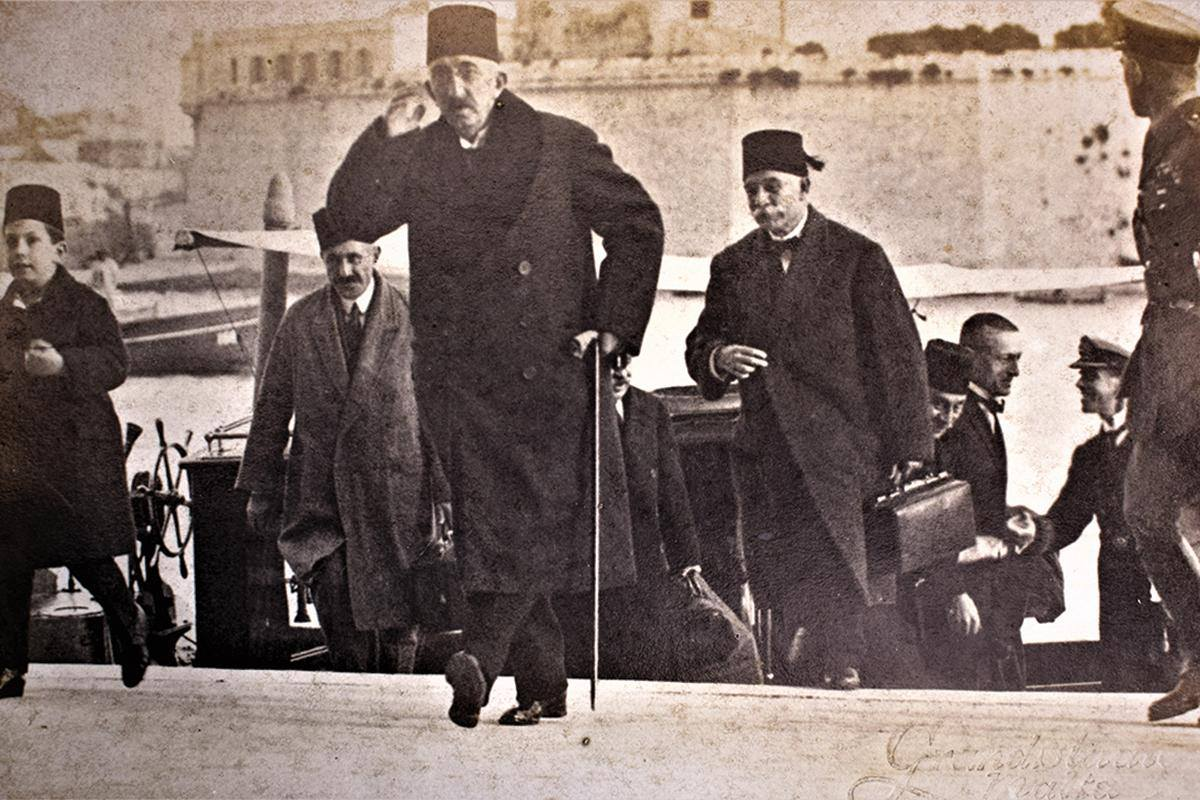
Mehmed VI arrives in Malta on a British warship, 9 December 1922. On the left, 10-year-old Prince Mehmed Ertuğrul Efendi

On 16 November 1922, Vahideddin wrote to General Charles Harington (the British General commanding the Army of Occupation)

Sir,

Considering my life in danger in Constantinople, I take refuge with the British Government, and request my transfer as soon as possible from Constantinople to another place.

Mehmed Vahideddin, Caliph of the Muslims.

He stated that he expected the protection of his person by England, which had the most Muslim subjects and its history of friendship with the Ottoman royal family and the Islamic Caliphate. He had requested British occupation authorities (and Lord Curzon) security of his person in the event he had to flee the country since July 1919 and made it his highest priority after the formal occupation of Istanbul. The day before his departure, he had lunch with his daughter, Ulviye Sultana.

Waking up to a rainy day on 17 November 1922, he took care not to take valuable items or jewelry owned by the Ottoman family, other than his personal belongings and burned many documents. He refused to bring with him the Relics of the Sacred Trust. He and his entourage of ten -including his son Şehzade Mehmed Ertuğrul- left Yıldız Palace under British ambulance escort to Dolmabahçe, and with Harington himself, boarded the British warship HMS Malaya at the Tophane docks. Admiral Sir Osmond Brock asked the Sultan where he wished to go, but a despondent Vahdeddin had no preference. Osmond suggested Malta, which he accepted.

In his memoirs, Vahideddin wrote that he did not flee, but performed a dignified hijrah by following the example of the Islamic prophet Muhammad, and that he would return to his homeland one day. He left without abdicating.

The British governor of Malta, Lord Plumer, welcomed Vahdeddin on behalf of George V. He thanked the king and reiterated that he had not given up his throne and the Caliphate. An eight-room apartment was prepared for the Sultan and his entourage in the Pini Barracks. On 19 November, his cousin and crown prince, Abdul Mejid, was elected caliph by the Grand National Assembly as Abdul Mejid II. Upon hearing this news Vahideddin said "Only my prophet [Muhammad] can do that" ["Beni ancak müvekkil-i zîşânım hal edebilir"]. He was doubtful his cousin could handle the Caliphate under the Kemalists:

Mecid Efendi finally achieved his wish. They sent an imam’s coat to the poor man. He is still pretending not to know and trying to sit on the throne by dragging his robe.

=== Umrah to Hejaz ===
Hussein bin Ali, King of Hejaz, who had rebelled against Turkey with British support in the Arab Revolt, invited the deposed Sultan to his new kingdom to perform umrah. He took up the invitation because he thought it undignified for him to live in a Christian country with his titles. His British hosts were happy to see him leave Malta as he was an expensive guest. He was welcomed by King Hussein's son at Port Said after a voyage on the Battleship HMS Ajax. He reached Jeddah via Suez on 15 January 1923. King Hussein welcomed his guest with a 101-gun salute with field guns previously operated by the Ottoman army. Also waiting for him was Rıza Tevfik (Bölükbaşı) and Mustafa Sabri. He treated him as a distinguished guest but not as a caliph, because Hussein was working to get himself recognized as caliph in the Islamic world. From there, they proceeded to Mecca. The deposed Sultan stayed in Mecca until the end of February 1923 when he informed Hussein that the dry heat was too much for him, and he wanted to go to Cyprus or Haifa, Palestine. Hussein was in correspondence with British intelligence, and remarked that there might be ulterior motives behind this. The British vetoed this wish; British hospitality for Vahdeddin hit its breaking point and his presence could have caused unrest in British controlled Muslim lands, he was told to stay in Taif. There he composed many poems about the longing he had for his homeland; in one of them he drew parallels to himself and Cem Sultan, an Ottoman prince that was similarly exiled from his empire.

The Islamic world criticized his visit to Hejaz because it was viewed as an insincere British public relations stunt for the Muslim world. The Indian Muslim writer Mawlana Abul Kelam accused Vahdeddin of being used by the British to sow discord among Muslims by sentencing Kemalist heroes to death while they were saving their nation. In the face of this criticism, Vahdeddin published a declaration addressed to the Islamic world with the hope of salvaging his legacy. A summary of the declaration, which could not be distributed due to King Hussein's censorship, was published in Al-Ahram. In this document, Mehmed Vahdeddin defended his actions as Sultan-Caliph as adhering to sunnah and responded to the accusations against him.

=== In Italy ===
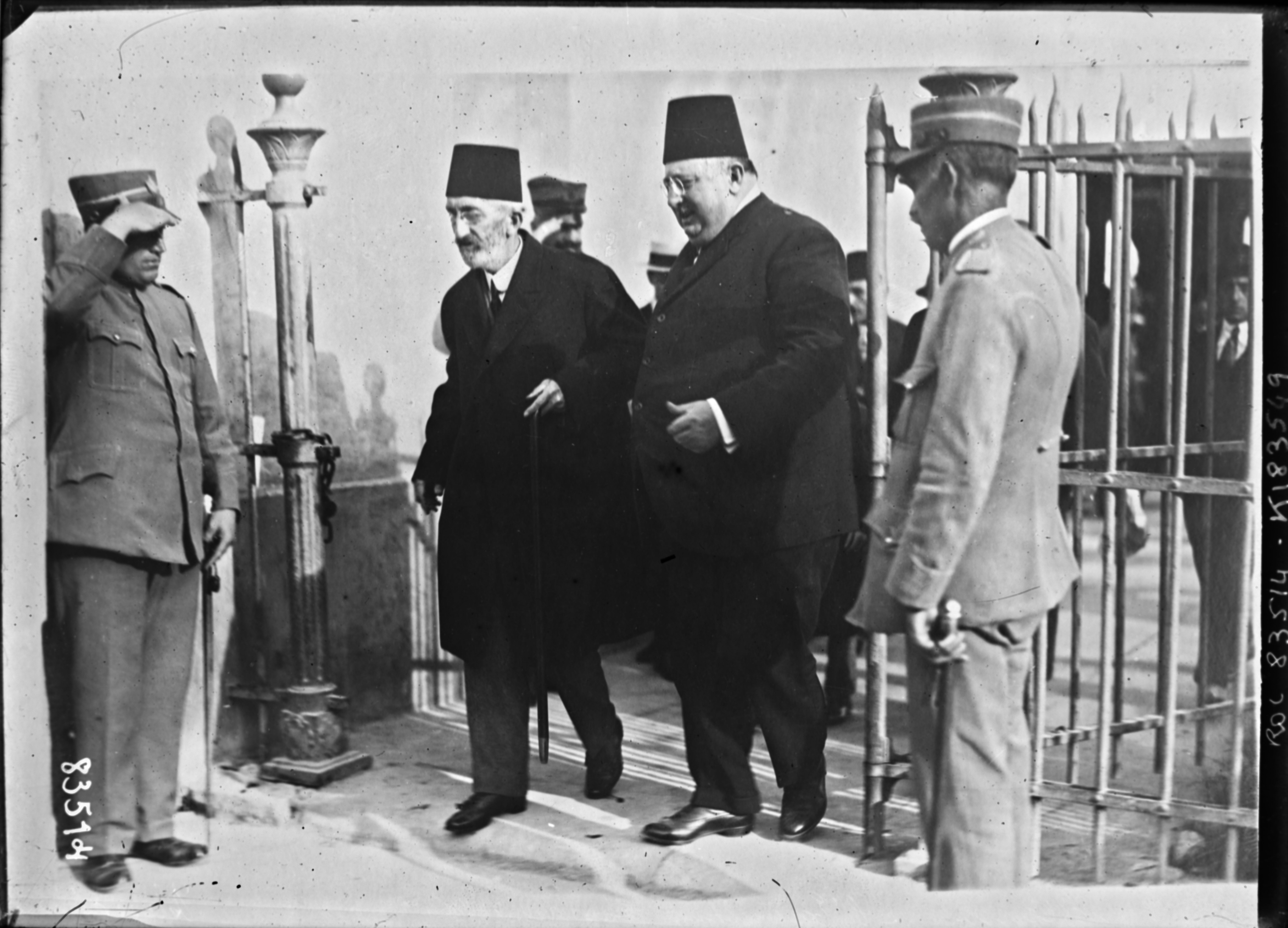
Vahdeddin arriving at San Remo, 1923

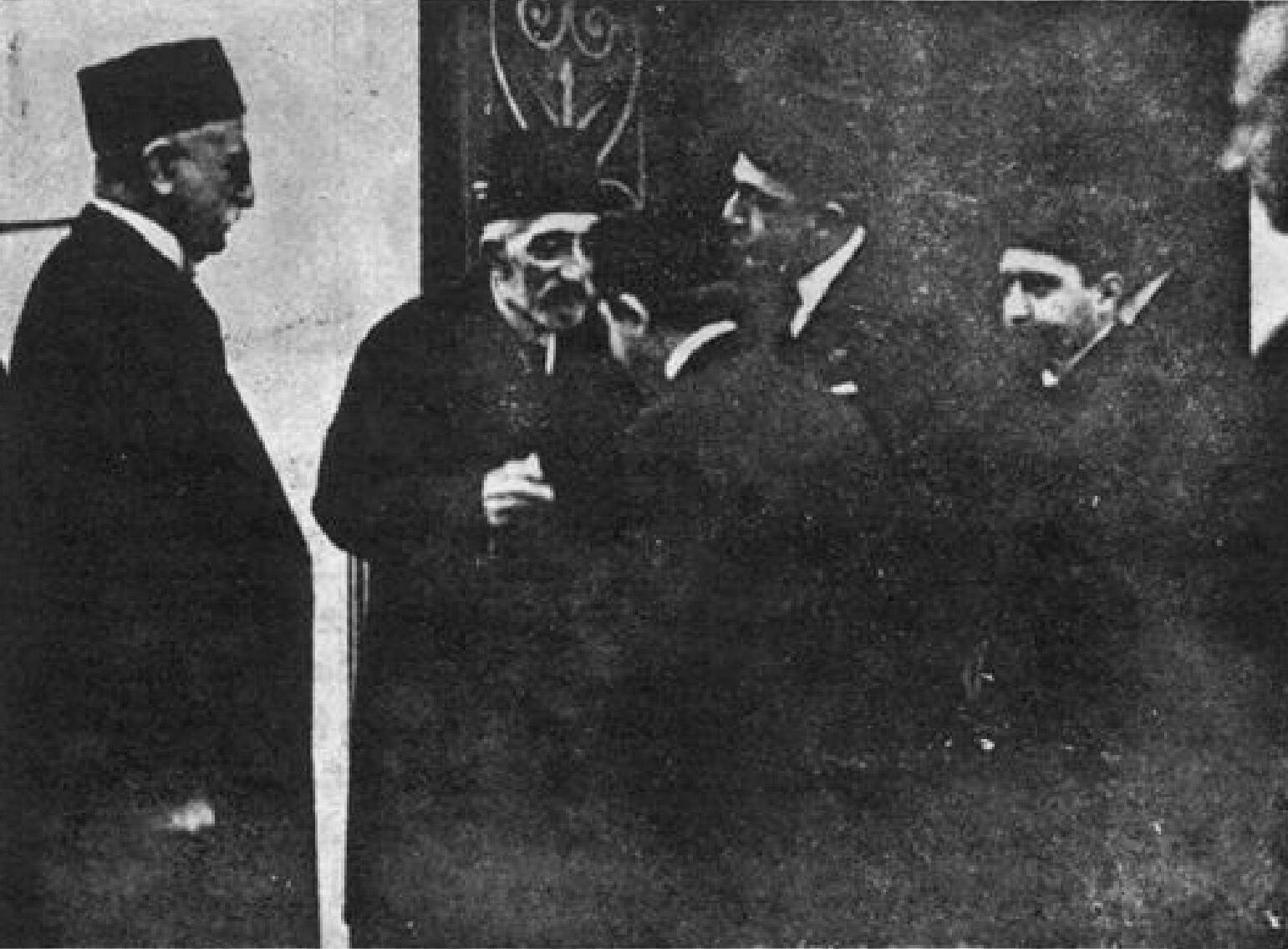
Vahdeddin and Ahmad Shah Qajar at the funeral of Mohammad Ali Shah Qajar, 1925, Sanremo

When Vahdeddin insisted that he could not stay in the Hejaz any longer, the British offered to house him in Switzerland, though he had to pay out of his own pocket for the journey. From Jeddah, he landed in Suez by sea and from there he reached Alexandria by train provided by the Egyptian government. But due to the ongoing Lausanne Conference, soon to produce the Treaty of Lausanne, the British realized his presence could raise unnecessary tensions and directed him to Italy.

Benito Mussolini and the Italian government, through King Victor Emmanuel III's aid-de-camp General Laderci, welcomed Vahdeddin with an unofficial ceremony at the Port of Genoa on 2 May 1923. Damad Ferid Pasha was a part of this crowd, and met with his former sovereign for the last time. Vahdeddin had good relations with the king since he was crown prince. His visit in 1900 coincided with the death of Victor Emmanuel's father Umberto I, and he was touched by Vahdeddin's offers of condolence. Vahdeddin moved to the Villa Nobel in San Remo, all expenses paid by the Italian government. He passed time playing his qanun and writing doomed petitions to England and France for permission to go to a Muslim land, and to object the attacks on the Ottoman Caliphate by the Turkish government. For sixteen months he lived there with Ertuğrul and a couple of servants.

On 3 March 1924 the Turkish government abolished the Caliphate and expelled the Ottoman Family (soon to be rendered surname Osmanoğlu) and he was able to reunite with the rest of his wives, Ulviye, Mediha, and his elder half-sister Princess Seniha. The family moved to the larger Villa Mamolya, though this strained their finances. As fugitives of the Ottoman court gathered in San Remo a Little Istanbul emerged. Abdul Mejid and his kin chose to settle in Nice, and he and Vahdeddin fought over the use of the title of Caliph and obtaining power of attorney, an issue which symbolized family leadership, to recover their family's properties in former Ottoman lands (see Efforts to recover Ottoman estates by the Ottoman family). The dispute was settled by granting neither power of attorney, but instead two lawyers: Reşad Halis Bey and Şerif Pasha. Vahdeddin would die six days after signing the paper work, and Abdul Mejid took over the legal cases and claimed sole power of attorney.

In 1924, Vahdeddin also had to deal with the suicide of his personal doctor Reşad Pasha, the fallout of which, in the Trial of the Distoliers, led to Ankara accusing the exiled Sultan-Caliph of planning a restoration. An investigation revealed an anti-Kemalist/pro-royalist secret society founded in 1920 known as the Tarikat-ı Salâhiye, which recruited members under the pretext of selling the drug distol, was involved in the Sheikh Said rebellion. In 1925 Reşad's son-in-law went to Turkey, and in front of an Independence Tribunal claimed his father-in-law was actually killed, and accused Vahdeddin of ordering his death so that plans for his restoration to the throne would not be interfered with. The judge agreed the evidence he provided of two likely fabricated letters indicated intent, and ten people were executed for their membership in the organization.

In Villa Mamolya he was visited by Generals Harrington and Osmond Brock. Royalty came to see him too, including the Aga Khan, Faisal of Iraq, and Mohammad Ali Shah Qajar. He struck up a friendship with the latter, though he previously turned down his son Ahmed Shah's petition to marry Sabiha due to their Shiism. The Italian government kept his household under surveillance, and after the Turkish government opened a consulate in Genoa, they joined in too.

With Turkey having abolished the Ottoman Caliphate, a congress was organized in Egypt to spiritually unite the Muslim world under a new Caliphate, a challenging question since no Muslim country other than Mustafa Kemal's Turkey was independent, and the British Empire ruled over the most Muslims anyway. In the end the Caliphate Congress would be inconclusive, and no widely recognized caliph has been proclaimed since. Vahdeddin protested that the congress was unnecessary because he was still Caliph. The congress met on 13 May 1926, but he died from a blocked artery before hearing of the news of the congress meeting on 16 May 1926 in Sanremo, Italy.

== Death and funeral ==
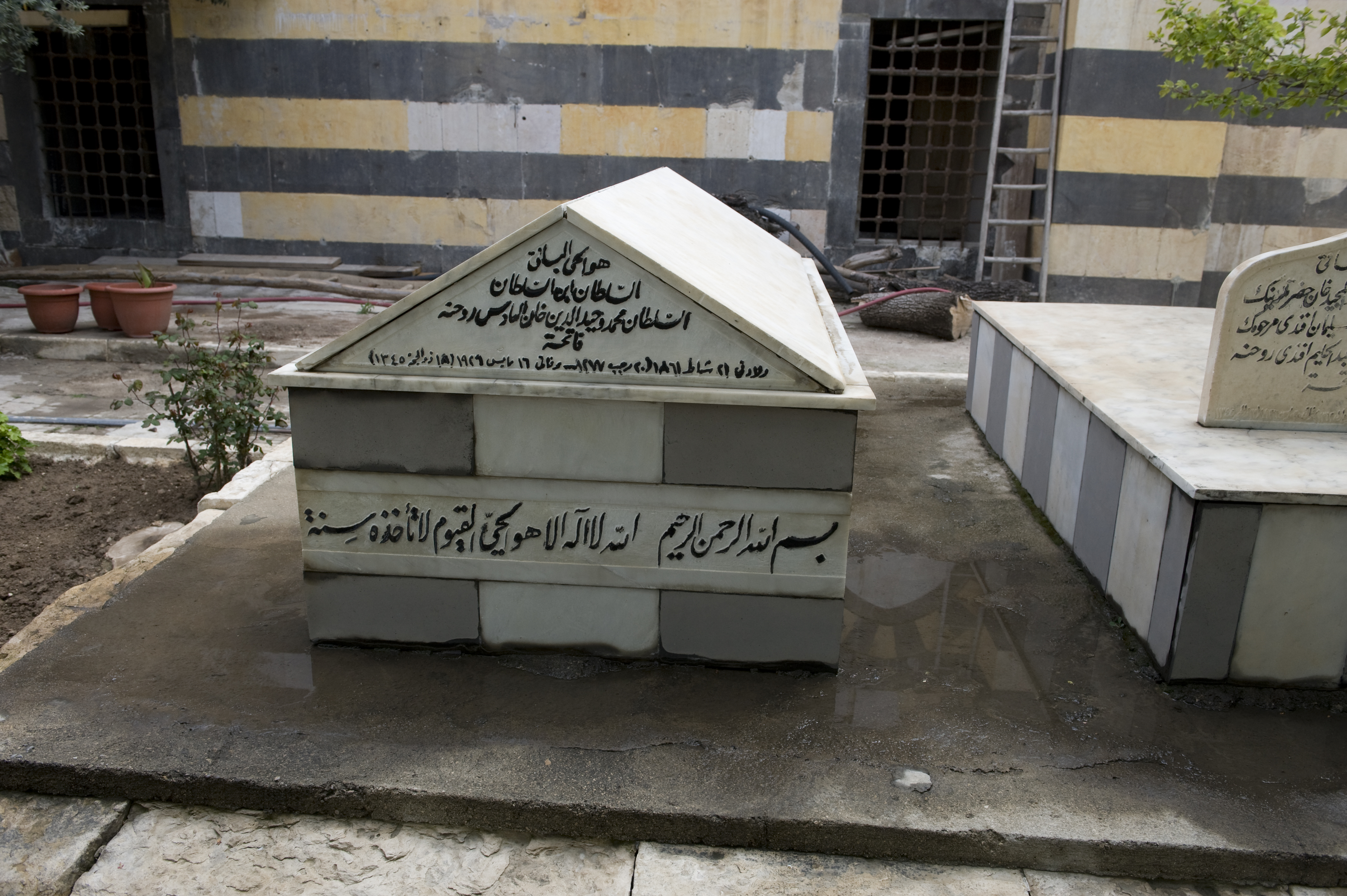
Mehmed VI's grave in the cemetery of Sulaymaniyya Takiyya in Damascus

Vahdeddin left Istanbul with £20,000 and died penniless, deep in debt. Most of the money was gambled away by his former brother-in-law and chief aid Zeki Bey in casinos and other acts of debauchery (Zeki was later discovered to be on Ankara's payroll to report on Vahdeddin's activities). A lot was given to swindlers and con-men that the exiled Sultan-Caliph felt obliged to gift. Since he was in dire financial straits, he had sold everything he had that could provide money, including some of his medals. He owed some 60,000 Italian lire to all the artisans and creditors of San Remo. Officers placed a lien on the Sultan's coffin along with all the belongings they found in Villa Mamolya and sealed the door. The funeral would be delayed for a month as money was scrounged to pay the creditors. Reactions of his death were cold indifference because Turkey and the wider Islamic world believed he was a traitor. President Mustafa Kemal, then having dinner with friends in Adana, quipped upon hearing the news: "A very honorable man has died, if he had wanted, he could have taken all the jewels from Topkapı, formed such an army, and returned.

In the meantime, a Muslim land was sought where the body could be buried – it was out of the question to bury him in Turkey. It was decided that it would be buried in the courtyard of the Suleymaniyye Mosque Complex in Damascus, commissioned by Mehmed VI's ancestor Suleiman the Magnificent. The necessary permission was soon obtained from France – the mandate power of Syria – and Sabiha found money for a burial. The French and Italian governments chose not to hold a state funeral for him, and the French foreign ministry deemed it unnecessary to deploy an honor guard. Once the debt was paid off the coffin was taken to a station by a horse-drawn carriage belonging to the Green Cross of Sanremo. They tried to erase the cross from the carriage but stains were still visible, and the simple coffin was otherwise unremarkable with no flowers. An Italian witness in the train station remarked that the funeral party was unworthy of a king. From there the coffin was transported to Trieste by train, the stationmaster placed a black wreath in the coffin's carriage, which was removed for being incompatible with Islamic customs. Here, the coffin was loaded onto a ship and transported to Beirut under the supervision of Ömer Faruk. Upon arriving in Beirut, Şehzades Selim, Mehmet Orhan, Abdülkerim, and Ömer Nami received the funeral party and noted that the coffin smelled meaning the body was likely not to have been embalmed. Selim noted a vast crowd assembled to welcome the party, and many Beirutis shook and kissed his hand and addressed him as "Sultan."

Vahdeddin was buried in the Suleymaniyye Tekiyye on 3 July 1926, in a background of fierce fighting and street clashes from the Great Syrian Revolt. His funeral was attended by members of the Mevlevi, Qadiri, and Rufai Sufi orders, Turkish civil servants and officers still in Damascus, and Syrian dignitaries, including president Ahmed Nami, an Ottoman damat. The body was at first buried under a pile of earth. Faruk and Sabiha lobbied the Syrian government to commission a mausoleum for him, but bureaucracy and Syria's chronic political instability prevented this from happening, so a compromise was made for a simple marble sarcophagus. Thirty other members of the Ottoman family were later buried in the complex's courtyard.

== Personality ==
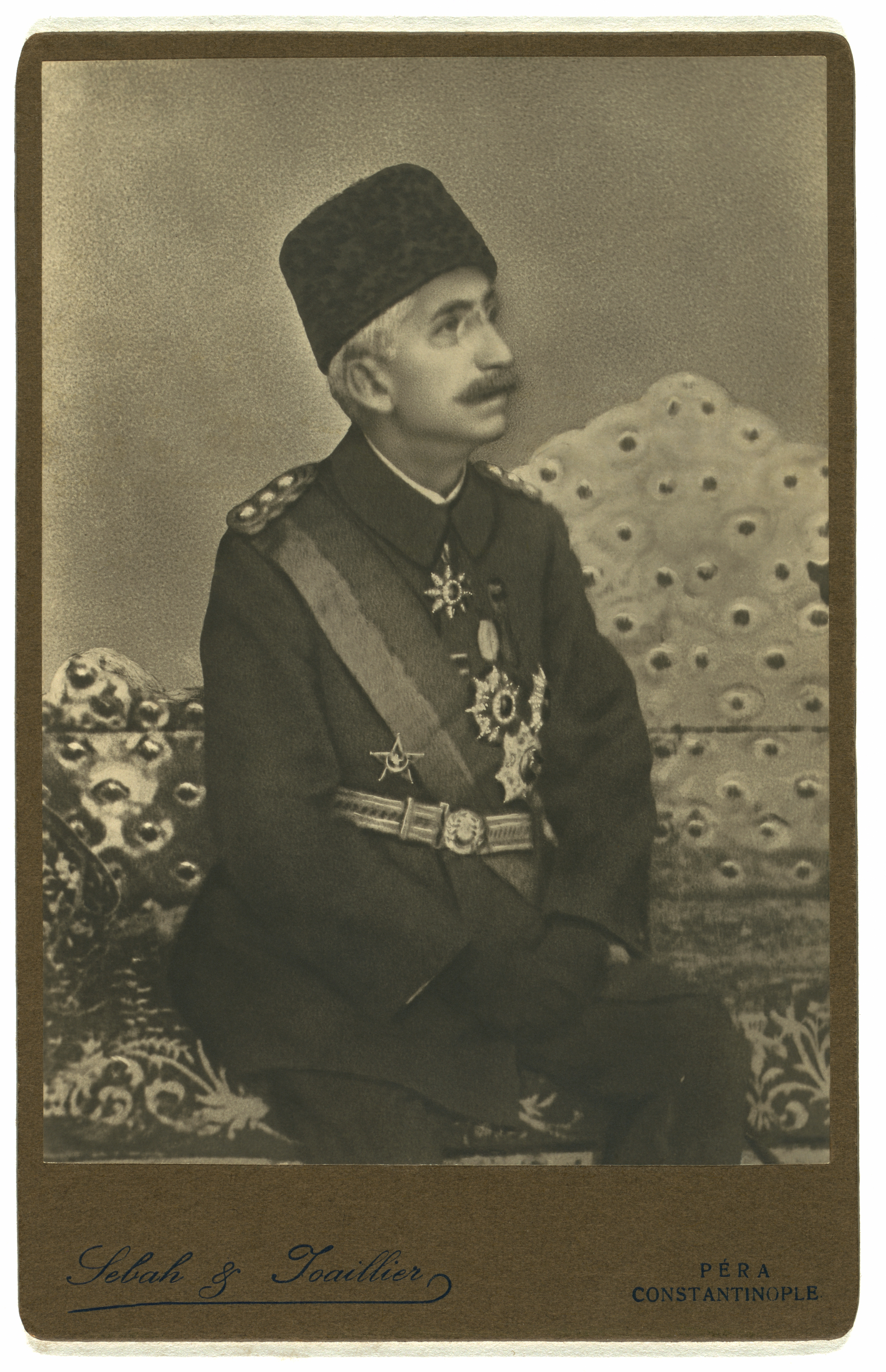
1920 portrait

A British intelligence report written in 1920 described Vahdeddin:

He is known for being against the CUP, but he has not openly taken part in any struggle in his political life. He is a considerable intellectual and a pleasant nature. He has sincere convictions to serve his country and protect his dynasty. After he ascended to the throne, his personal influence and authority as Sultan-Caliph became a factor in domestic affairs. He had ideas that he knew how to use, but his weakness, timidity and caution prevented him from turning the throne into a strong element. He believed that the grace of England could save Turkey. Despite being extremely nervous, he expressed his ideas comfortably. His private life is free of scandals, but it is said that he finds solace in his sorrows in friendship with ladies.

Vahdeddin had an optimistic and patient personality according to the testimony of his relatives and employees. He was evidently a kind family man in his palace; outside, and especially at official ceremonies, he would stand cold, frowning and serious, and would not compliment anyone; he attached great importance to religious traditions; he would not tolerate rumors, nor would he allow them to circulate in his palace. Even in his informal conversations, he always attracted attention with seriousness.

Mehmed VI was talented in literature, music, and calligraphy, a tradition of his family. His compositions were performed in the palace when he was on the throne. Instead of commissioning his own anthem he signed an edict making his grandfather Mahmud II's anthem as the official national anthem of Turkey. The lyrics of the poems he composed while in Taif envision the longing of the country and the pain of not getting the news that they have left behind. He loved to play the saz and qanun. Sixty-three works belonging to him can be identified, but only forty works have signatures.

== Assessment ==
Mehmed VI's legacy in modern Turkey has stayed moribund. His government's signing of the Treaty of Sèvres, and other actions taken during his reign, has him condemned in Turkish history as a traitor, coward, and a British collaborator. Recent scholarship into his life had painted a more nuanced picture. Murat Bardakçı asserted the Sultan was more of a tragic, if incompetent, monarch faced with an incredible crisis. Some historians, principally championed by Bardakçı, assert that Vahdeddin not only provided Mustafa Kemal the resources to coordinate a nationalist resistance against the Allies but intended him to do so, but Kemal chose to betray his sovereign. This theory is supported by ideological Islamists, such as the poet Necip Fazıl Kısakürek. Competing theories of why the government gave Mustafa Kemal such extensive powers in his assignment as Ninth Army Troops Inspector have remained inconclusive.

In an interview between Suat Hayri Ürgüplü and Sabiha Sultana, Sabiha would say that the man her father most admired was Mustafa Kemal and that he was not a traitor.

Those close to Vahdeddin described him as intelligent and quick-grasped, but he was under the influence of his entourage and especially those he believed in, that he had a very evident, unstable and stubborn temperament. A quality he shared with Abdul Hamid II was his knack for stalling and using time to have problems solve themselves, though in practice these strategies were disastrous when decisive action was necessary.

== Honours ==
=== Turkish honours ===
- Order of House of Osman, Jeweled
- Order of Glory, Jeweled
- Imtiyaz Medal, Jeweled
- Order of Osmanieh, Jeweled
- Order of the Medjidie, Jeweled

=== Foreign honours ===
- Prussia: Order of the Black Eagle of Prussia, 15 October 1917

== Family ==
=== Consorts ===
Mehmed VI had five consorts:

- Nazikeda Kadın (9 October 1866 – 4 April 1941). Başkadin and only consort for twenty years, she is considered the last Ottoman Empress. She was born Emine Marşania, she was Abkhazian and before marrying Mehmed she was in the service of Cemile Sultan with her sisters and cousins. Mehmed married her in 1885, after a year of insistence and the threat that he would never marry anyone else and the promise that Nazikeda would be his only consort. He kept his word until, after giving him three daughters, Nazikeda could no longer have children, which forced Mehmed to take other consorts to have male heirs. She was described as tall and beautiful, buxom, with fair skin, light hazel eyes, and long auburn hair.
- Inşirah Hanım (10 July 1887 – 10 June 1930). Born Seniye Voçibe, she was Circassian, the niece of Durriaden Kadin, consort of Mehmed V, older half-brother of Mehmed VI. She was tall, with beautiful blue eyes and very long dark brown hair. She was proposed to by Mehmed in 1905. Inşirah refused, but was obliged by her father and her brother. Unhappy but still jealous, she divorced Mehmed in 1909, when she found a servant in his quarters. Having divorced before Mehmed's accession to the throne, she was never an Imperial Consort. Later she fell into depression. She tried to return to her husband in 1922, when he was in exile at Sanremo, Italy, but she was not allowed to see him and he was not notified of her presence. She attempted suicide twice. The first time she was saved by her niece, but the second time she succeeded by drowning herself in the Nile.
- Müveddet Kadın (12 October 1893 – 20 December 1951). Second Imperial Consort and only consort other than Nazikeda to obtain the title of Kadın. Born Şadiye Çıhcı, she was introduced to the court by Habibe Hanım, treasurer of Mehmed's harem. They were married in 1911. She was tall, with blue eyes and auburn hair and was known as a very sweet, shy, kind-hearted and hardworking woman. She was also loved and respected by her stepdaughters. She bore Mehmed her only son, whose death caused her to fall into depression. After Mehmed's death she remarried, but divorced after four years.
- Nevvare Hanım (4 May 1901 – 13 June 1992). Başikbal. Born Ayşe Çıhçı, she was niece of Müveddet Kadın, who raised her. She married Mehmed in 1918, although Müveddet did everything possible to prevent this. She was tall and beautiful, with green eyes and long black hair, of a kind but proud disposition. She filed for divorce in 1922, when Mehmed was deposed and exiled, and she was granted it in 1924. After that, she remarried.
- Nevzad Hanım (2 March 1902 – 23 June 1992). Second Ikbal and last woman to become consort of an Ottoman sultan. Born Nimet Bargu. She married Mehmed in 1921, previously she had been a Kalfa (servant) in the household of Şehzade Mehmed Ziyaeddin, son of Sultan Mehmed V. She was Mehmed's favorite consort in his later years, so much so that it is said that he never agreed to part with her. After Mehmed's death she changed her name back to Nimet and remarried. By her second marriage she had a son and a daughter. She never agreed to talk about her years as Imperial Consort.

=== Son ===
Mehmed VI had only one son:

- Şehzade Mehmed Ertuğrul (5 November 1912 – 2 July 1944) – with Müveddet Kadın. He never married or had children.

=== Daughters ===
Mehmed VI had three daughters:

- Münire Fenire Sultana (1888 – 1888, two weeks later) – with Nazikeda Kadın. Died an infant, she is sometimes regarded as twins rather than a single princess.
- Fatma Ulviye Sultana (11 September 1892 – 1 January 1967) – with Nazikeda Kadın. Married twice, she had one daughter.
- Rukiye Sabiha Sultana (19 March 1894 – 26 August 1971) – with Nazikeda Kadın. She married Şehzade Ömer Faruk and had three daughters.

== See also ==
- Line of succession to the former Ottoman throne
- Osmanoğlu family
- Alexandre Vallaury

== Notes ==
Mehmed VI House of Osman Born: 14 January 1861 Died: 16 May 1926
Regnal titles
Preceded by Mehmed V	Sultan of the Ottoman Empire; 3 July 1918 – 1 November 1922	Sultanate abolished Succeeded by Mustafa Kemal Atatürk as President of Turkey
Sunni Islam titles
Preceded by Mehmed V	Caliph of the Ottoman Caliphate; 3 July 1918 – 19 November 1922	Succeeded by Abdulmejid II
Preceded by Sultanate abolished	Head of the Osmanoğlu family 1 November 1922 – 16 May 1926	Abdulmejid II
