= Nevvare Hanım =

Consort of Ottoman Sultan Mehmed VI

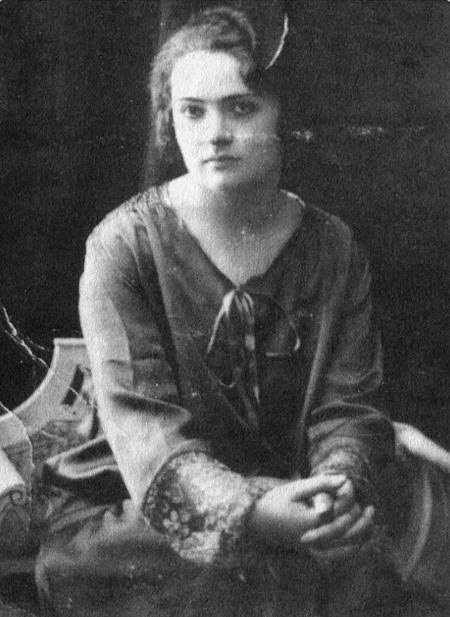
- Born: Ayşe Çıhçı; 4 May 1901; Derbent, Ottoman Empire
- Died: 13 June 1992 (aged 91); Derbent, Turkey
- Burial: Derbent cemetery
- Spouse: Mehmed VI (m. 1919; div. 1924) Mevlüd Bey (m. 1926; died 1974)
Names
- Turkish: Ayşe Nevvare Hanım; Ottoman Turkish: نوارہ خانم
- House: Çıhçı (by birth); Ottoman (by marriage)
- Father: Mustafa Çıhcı
- Mother: Hafize Kap-Ipha
- Religion: Sunni Islam

Nevvare Hanım (Ottoman Turkish: نوارہ خانم; "young blessing" or "young child"; born Ayşe Çıhçı, after 1926 Nevvare Leyla Sönmezler; 4 May 1901 – 13 June 1992) was the fourth consort of Sultan Mehmed VI of the Ottoman Empire.

== Early life ==
Nevvare Hanım was born on 4 May 1901 in Derbent, Ottoman Empire. Born as Ayşe Çıhçı, she was a member of Abkhazian noble family, Çıhçı. Her father was Mustafa Bey Çıhcı, and her mother was Hafize Hanım Kap-Ipha.

As a young child, she had been sent to live in Mehmed's Çengelköy mansion when he had been a prince, and where after sometime she became a lady-in-waiting to her aunt Müveddet Kadın. Here her name was changed, to Nevvare, according to the custom of the Ottoman court. She was a close friend of princess Leyla Achba, also a consort of Mehmed. Nevvare was very beautiful and tall, with green eyes and long black hair.

== First marriage ==
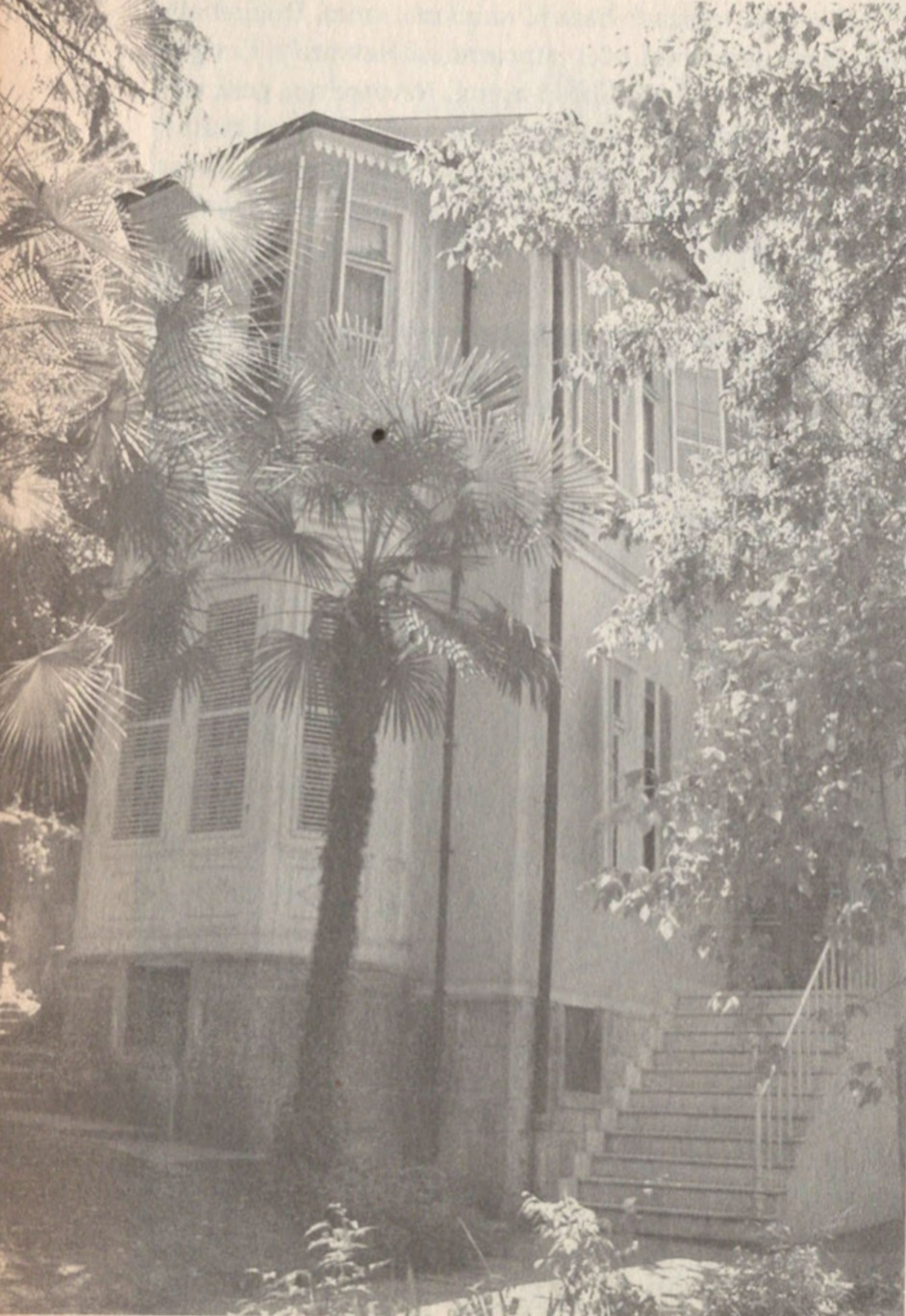
Mansion belonging to Nevvare Hanım

Mehmed noticed Nevvare among the ladies of Müveddet and fell in love with her. Nevvare married Mehmed on 20 June 1918 in the Dolmabahçe Palace, although Müveddet was opposed in every way. Mehmed was fifty-seven, while Nevvare was seventeen years old. Nevvare remained childless. After Mehmed's accession to the throne on 4 July 1918, she was given the title of "Senior Ikbal", although she would have been entitled to the title of Third Kadın. He probably did not receive the title so as not to further offend Müveddet. She was given a mansion on the grounds of the Yıldız Palace. Her close friend Leyla described her as kind but very proud.

After Mehmed's deposition in 1922, he was sent into exile in San Remo. She, like the rest of the family members, was imprisoned in Feriye Palace. During their stay in the Feriye, Nevvare became so sick that she had to be taken to a hospital. She wasn't issued a passport, and it was decided that she should join the others once she felt a little better. Nevvare managed to sneak out disguised as Kalfa, and on 6 March 1924, her parents took her to her hometown in Derbent. After she regained her health, she wrote to the Sultan asking for a divorce, which was granted on 20 May 1924.

== Second marriage ==
In 1926, Nevvare married a trader named Mevlüd Bey Sönmezler and changed her name to Leyla Hanım, in honor of her old friend Leyla Achba. They first settled in Ferenyolu, then in Derbent. In 1940, widowed, she settled in Şişli.

== Death ==
In the 1970s she bought a house in Derbent, where she had been born, and lived there until her death. Nevvare died on 13 June 1992 at the age of ninety-one in Derbent, and was buried in a cemetery in Derbent.

== See also ==
- Ikbal (title)
- Ottoman Imperial Harem
- List of consorts of the Ottoman sultans

== Sources ==
- Açba, Leyla (2004). Bir Çerkes prensesinin harem hatıraları. L & M. ISBN 978-9-756-49131-7.
- Sakaoğlu, Necdet (2008). Bu Mülkün Kadın Sultanları: Vâlide Sultanlar, Hâtunlar, Hasekiler, Kandınefendiler, Sultanefendiler. Oğlak Yayıncılık. ISBN 978-6-051-71079-2.
- Uluçay, M. Çağatay (2011). Padişahların kadınları ve kızları. Ötüken. ISBN 978-9-754-37840-5.
