= Vahdettin Pavilion =

Building in Istanbul, Turkey

Coordinates: 41°03′13″N 29°03′17″E

- Vahdettin Köşkü
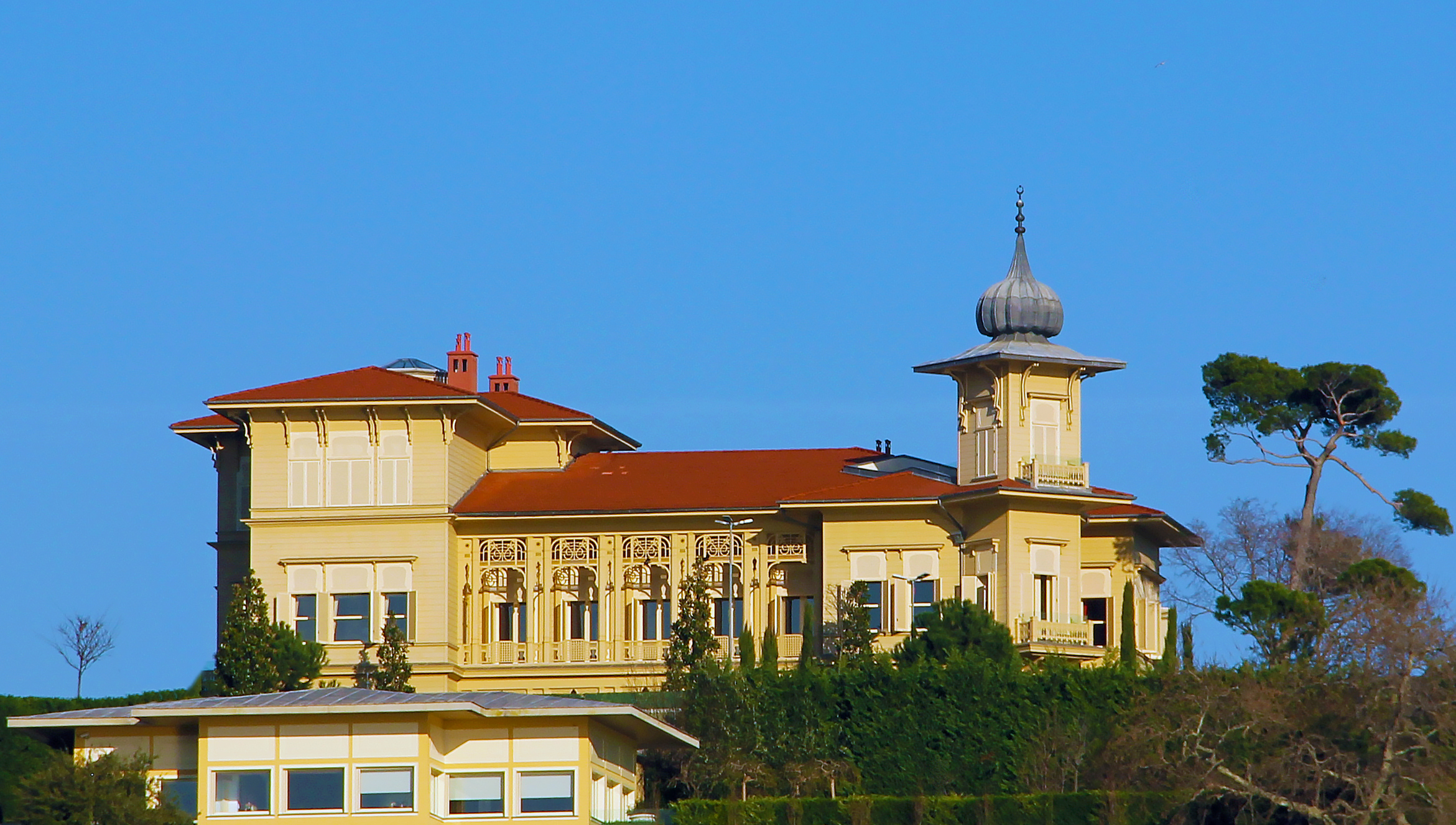

- Location within Istanbul
- Etymology: Ottoman Sultan Vahdettin

General information
- Location: Çengelköy, Üsküdar, Istanbul, Turkey
- Current tenants: President of Turkey
- Construction started: 2013
- Owner: General Directorate for Foundations

Technical details
- Grounds: 65 decares (65,000 m^{2}; 700,000 sq ft)

Vahdettin Pavilion, a.k.a. Çengelköy Pavilion (Turkish: Vahdettin Köşkü or Çengelköy Köşkü) is the name of a rebuilt structure in Çengelköy neighborhood of Üsküdar district in Istanbul, Turkey. It is also the name of a historical timber mansion which stood at the same location. The original pavilion was used by the then Ottoman şehzade (prince) Mehmed Vahdettin. The site of this monument, which was demolished in 2013 and replaced with an inaccurate concrete replica, is now an official residence assigned to the President of Turkey. It is also used as state guest house.

The residence was designed by the French-Ottoman architect Alexander Vallaury (1850–1921) and built by Ottoman Sultan Abdul Hamid II (reigned 1876–1909). The sultan allocated the building to his brother, Mehmed Vahdettin (1861–1926), who resided in the pavilion before he ascended the throne in 1918. As he was removed from throne in 1922, and was forced to leave the country, he gave the property to one of his odalisques. The real estate was parceled and sold to third persons.

It is situated on a hill in Çengelköy, on the Asian part of Istanbul, overlooking the Bosphorus. The real estate covers an area of 65 decares (65,000 m^{2}; 700,000 sq ft). There are additional buildings in the property including Old Köçeoğlu Pavilion, Kadın Efendi Pavilion and Ağalar Apartment.

In 1988, Prime minister Turgut Özal (in office: 1983–1989) instructed the development of the pavilion into a rest home for the prime ministry. The restoration works terminated with the death of Özal in 1993. The contractor abandoned the buildings as the appropriations stood away. In 2007, the property was handed over from the Ministry of Culture and Tourism to the General Directorate for Foundations, which assigned it to the Prime Ministry. Prime Minister Recep Tayyip Erdoğan (in office: 2003–2014) ordered the restart of the renovation works. All the buildings were pulled down. During the 'reconstruction' no attention was given to the architectural details, materialization, orientation, location, or the existing surrounding landscape design. Three adjoining historical timber mansions were demolished as well, and similarly all of them were 'rebuilt' without giving any attention to the original designs. The buildings resemble the original monuments only superficially. For landscaping, an area of 4,000 m^{2} (43,000 sq ft) was nationalized by governmental decree in 2013. Hundreds of trees were felled surrounding the Pavilion, and a tall concrete wall now surrounds the complex. During Ramadan 2014 residents of 14 neighboring structures were evicted from their homes. The transformation works completed in August 2014. Vahdettin Pavilion is used by the prime minister and serves also as a state guest house.

There are a greenhouse, a decorative pool with water lilies, a helipad and a parking garage in the residence area. The wood in which the pavilion is situated features about three hundred trees, including stone pine (Pinus pinea), linden (Tilia), oak (Quercus), cedar of Lebanon (Cedrus libani), laurel, redbud (Cercis) and gumwood (Commidendrum).
