= Hacı Abdürrahim Efendi =

Ottoman scholar

Hacı Abdürrahim Efendi or Hoca Abdürrahim Efendi was a seventeenth-century Ottoman scholar and Shaykh al-Islām.

Abdürrahim was born in Adana, the son of Mehmed Efendi of Adana. He studied under Hüseyin Halhalî, Ahmed Münceli, and Sadreddinzâde Mehmed Emin Şirvânî.

Later, Abdürrahim joined the order of Hocazade Abdulaziz Efendi and became his assistant (mülâzım). Between 1620 and 1624, he was müderris at the madrasas of Siyavuş Paşa, Hâfız Paşa, Mustafa Paşa, Sahn-ı Seman, Ayasofya, Süleymaniye, and Sultan Ahmed. In 1634 he was appointed qadi of Yenişehir and in 1638-39 qadi of Istanbul. He married Saliha Hanım, a granddaughter of Hoca Sâdeddin Efendi. He trained many students, including Çatalcalı Ali Efendi, Mehmed Bahâî, Mustafa Bolevî, and Yahya Minkarîzâde.

After the 1638 capture of Baghdad, Murad IV brought the scholar Molla Çelebi el-Âmidî to Istanbul, where Âmidî asked "nine difficult questions" to test the scholars of the city. The questions led to heated debate among the scholars. Abdürrahim was among the few whose written responses were considered acceptable.

In 1641 he was appointed kazasker of Anatolia. He was briefly qadi of Adana and then in 1645 was appointed kazasker of Rumelia.

Abdürrahim was made Shaykh al-Islām of the Ottoman Empire in April 1647. According to one account, Sultan Ibrahim believed that Grand Vizier Salih Paşa, Kösem Sultan, and Abdürrahim were plotting to overthrow him and so in September 1647 had Salih Paşa executed.

Abdürrahim's most important action as Shaykh al-Islām was to issue a fatwa to depose Ibrahim and then a fatwa to kill him in August 1648. He had the support of the Janissary leaders and religious scholars in this action. However, Abdürrahim attracted the dislike of the people of Istanbul because of the luxurious life he and his son (Mehmed Efendi, qadi of Istanbul) lived. Abdürrahim was dismissed by Grand Vizier Kara Murat Paşa in July 1649 and sent to Mecca.

After hajj, Abdürrahim was made qadi of Jerusalem. Eventually through the influence of the Janissary leaders, he returned to Istanbul and was made qadi of Üsküdar. During the 1651 revolt against the Janissary leaders (Ağalar Vak‘ası), he was sent away to Belgrade. He died there on February 6, 1656, and was buried (in May 1656, according to some sources) behind the mihrab of the Imaret Mosque.
