= Zenbilli Ali Cemali Efendi =

Ottoman mufti and shaykh al-Islam (1445–1526)

Personal life
- Born: Ali Cemali; 1445 Aksaray, Ottoman Empire
- Died: 1526 (aged 80–81) Istanbul, Ottoman Empire
- Main interest(s): Fiqh, Usul, Lughat, Nahw, Tafsir, Hadith
- Notable work: Fatwas

Religious life
- Religion: Islam
- Denomination: Sunni
- Jurisprudence: Hanafi

Muslim leader
- Influenced: * Ottoman scholars and statesmen

Zenbilli Ali Cemali Efendi (1445 – 1526) Ottoman mufti, Islamic scholar (alim), shaykh al-Islam, Sufi, and minister. Zenbilli Ali was the son of Ahmed Çelebi, the grandson of Cemaleddin Aksarayi, a descendant of Fahraddin al-Razi. Since he is the descendant of Cemaleddin Aksarâyî, he is referred to with the title of Cemali (pronounced Jemali), like his contemporary relatives and other statesmen and scholars. He was known among the people as "Zenbilli mufti" and "Zenbilli Ali Efendi", because he took people's questions with a weaved basket (zenbil) hanging from the window of his house in order to conclude the affairs of those who applied to him for a fatwa in a short time and put the answers back in the zenbil.

== Birth ==
According to Cavit Baysun, Zenbilli Ali was born in the first reign of Sultan Mehmed the Conqueror, which coincides with 1444-1446 CE. According to Hüseyin Hüsameddin, he was born in Eslem Hatun (Islam) neighborhood in Amasya. Som sources mention his birthplace as Karaman. It is known that the Cemali family resided in Aksaray and later some of this family migrated to Istanbul and for this reason it is likely that he was born in Aksaray.

== Career ==
Zenbilli Ali Cemali Efendi received his first education from Mevlana Hamza of Larende, who was the grandfather of Piri Mehmed Pasha from his mother's side. Then he went to Istanbul and attended the lessons of Molla Hüsrev. When Molla Hüsrev was appointed to the office of mufti, he went to Bursa and began to take lessons from Mevlana Hüsamzade Mustafa Efendi, who was the instructor of Sultaniye. When he completed his education, Hüsamzade took him as his partner and married him to his daughter. During the reign of Mehmed the Conqueror, he was appointed as the professor of the Ali Bey Madrasa according to Mecdi and the Taşlık Madrasa according to Hodja Sadeddin. Clothes along with 5000 coins were sent to him by the sultan as gifts. When Karamini Mehmed Pasha became the grand vizier, he first transferred him to the Beylerbeyi Madrasa in Edirne, and then to the Siraciye Madrasa, due to the close relationship between his political rival Sinan Pasha and Zenbilli Ali Efendi, and reduced his salary. Upon this, Zenbilli Ali Cemali resigned from his duty, entered the service of the Halvetiyye Sufi order Sheikh Mesud-i Edirnevi and tried to get his support. Later he moved to Istanbul. Here, besides Sinan Pasha, he attended the lodge (tekke) of Sheikh Ibn ul-Vefa Muslihuddin Mustafa from Konya and met with him frequently. After the death of Fatih Sultan Mehmed and the murder of Grand Vizier Karamani Mehmed Pasha by the janissaries. He became a professor again during the Sultan Bayezid II period. According to Mecdi, Bayezid II saw Ali Cemali in a dream one night and wanted to meet and talk to him. Ali Cemali Efendi did not accept this, saying "Meeting with sultans is the worst of permissible things [in religion]", but the sultan still gave him the professorship of Hudavendigar (Thermal Spring) Madrasah in Bursa. Hodja Sadeddin and Atai write that he was sent to the Mufti of Amasya. Sultan Bayezid II probably wanted to show his loyalty to his sheikh by sending him to Amasya, the residence place of Çelebi Khalife (Cemal-i Halveti) from the Cemali family, who played an influential role during his reign.

Ali Cemali Efendi was appointed to Hudavendigar Madrasah in Bursa after being Mufti of Amasya, and then to Bursa Sultaniyesi (Yeşilcami Madrasa). Mecdi writes that while he was a professor in Bursa (even though he did not want it), the mufti of the city was given to him. When the construction of the Amasya Beyazıt Madrasa was completed in 1486, he went there again as a professor and assumed the role of Mufti of Amasya. Meanwhile, when Şehzade Ahmed, who was an administrator in Amasya, put his teacher Birgivizade Mustafa Efendi ahead of the ulema there at the circumcision wedding of his sons Murad and Alaeddin in 896 (1491), Cemali Efendi left his job and returned to Istanbul. However, it should be taken into account that the attitude of the Sunni mystics and scholars in Amasya against Şehzade Ahmed who is said to be close to the Persian (Shia) ulama, had an effect on this. Mecdi writes that Bayezid II got angry and dismissed him because he left the madrasah in Amasya without permission. It could be for this reason that Ali Cemali Efendi waited for six months and was appointed to the professorship of the Sultan (Beyazit II) Madrasa, which Bayezid II had opened for him in Istanbul. When he hesitated to accept the position because this madrasah was not suitable for his scholarly level, he was transferred to one of the Semaniye madrasahs. While in this position, he went on Hajj (pilgrimage) with his uncle Çelebi Khalifa. However, he had to wait in Egypt for a year due to some turmoil in Mecca and was able to fulfill his pilgrimage the following year. While he was in Egypt in 908 AH/1503 CE, the mufti of Istanbul Efdalzade Hamiduddin Efendi died and the mufti post was given to him. The fatwa authority was left to the teachers of Sahn-i Seman until he returned. Ali Cemali Efendi most probably came to Istanbul towards the middle of 910 AH / 1504 CE and sat in the office of fatwa.

In addition to this, Sultan Bayezid II handed him the madrasa built in Istanbul in 911 AH (1505-1506) – now the Turkish Calligraphy Foundation Museum – along with 50 coins to teach one day a week. In 912 AH (1506-1507) the Sultan appointed Ali Cemali Effendi a minister for the trusts (waqifs) of his charitable foundations in different parts of the Ottoman Empire. He continued working as a professor at Beyazit Madrasah in Istanbul. Following this, it has become a custom for the sultan to give the supervision of the foundations belonging to him to the muftis of Istanbul, which would turn into the post of Sheikh al-Islam.

Sultan Selim the Resolute (Yavuz in Turkish) ascended the throne after Bayezid II and left Zenbilli Ali Efendi as mufti during his reign. Ali Cemali Efendi remained in this position until his death during the reign of Sultan Suleiman the Magnificent. Ali Cemali joined the Ottoman conquest of the island of Rhodes in the time of Sultan Suleiman and led the first Juma (Friday congregational prayer) in the Cathedral of Saint Jean, which was converted into a mosque. In 929 AH (1523 CE) he became too ill for work and Suleiman the Magnificent asked him to appoint a regent in his place. He appointed Sheikh Bahaeddinzade Muhyiddin Mehmed. This situation continued until his death, so his term as mufti was 24 years. The date of his death is estimated as a little before the month of Sha'ban 932 AH (May–June 1526). His grave is in the cemetery of the mosque and school he had built in Zeyrek.

== Legacy ==
According to sources, Zenbilli Ali Cemali Efendi was a dignified scholar who had authority in the fields of literature, fiqh, usul, lughat (vocabulary), nahw (syntax), tafsir, and hadith. Although he remained in the fatwa office for a long time, he was humble until the end of his life. According to the statement in Risale-i Hirz al-Muluk, he enjoyed making people's work easier and would conclude the affairs of those who applied for a fatwa in a short time.

Zenbilli Ali Efendi also had a mystical side. Hence he is recorded in some works with the title "Sufi" and described as "arbab-i hal" (person of spiritual states) and "sahib-i karamat" (displayer of miraculous works). Although he had close relatives from Halvetiyye sheikhs such as Çelebi Khalifa and Ishak Karamani, he was affiliated with Sheikh Muslihuddin Mustafa, the sheikh of the Zeyniyye order.

Sources state that he did not make concessions in scholarly matters and even opposed the tough-tempered Sultan Selim the Resolute. It is claimed that he told the sultan without hesitation that the officials would be punished within the framework of legal rules, that they could not be killed by the order of the sultan, that the execution would be possible with the mufti's fatwa after the court decision, and that he prevented some personal practices and determined the limits of the sultan's authority. Rumor has it that he once openly told Sultan Selim that he would issue a fatwa for his abdication if he were to order executions that were "contrary to the Sacred Law (Sharia)". When the sultan sternly informed him not to interfere in decisions regarding state administration, Zenbilli Ali Efendi angrily left the sultan's presence without obtaining permission. Sultan Selim I, who realized the mistake of this behavior later complimented him and offered to give him the kazasker positions of Anatolia and Rumelia. It is very likely that such narrations about Zenbilli Ali Efendi and Sultan Selim I are aimed at emphasizing the importance of the station of shaykh al-Islam, which was in fact in the forming as a new official institution. Just as in the case of the office of grand vizier, the first important steps to take on a form for the Istanbul mufti office in order to ensure religious control were taken during his duty.

Zenbilli Ali Cemali Efendi was known for his philanthropy and had mosques and schools built in different parts of Istanbul. While Alaca Mescid was on Tersane street in Galata, it was demolished in 1957 when Azapkapı street was opened. Mufti Ali (Zenbilli Ali) Efendi Mosque is in the Küçük Mustafa Paşa district. It was built in 932 (1525–26). The single-domed, square planned Ali Cemali Efendi School was built on Zeyrek Slope between 1523 and 1525. Mufti Hamam, destroyed in 1960, was located near the Mufti Ali Mosque in the Fatih Kadı Fountain. The income of this bath was donated to the mosque and school mentioned above. Muhyiddin Mehmed Şah Efendi (Molla Çelebi), one of the sons of Zenbilli Ali Efendi, is the author of Târîh-i Âl-i Osman, and Ruhi Çelebi is the author of another Tevârîh-i Âl-i Osman. Fudayl Çelebi, on the other hand, is a scholar who has various poetic and prose works. Cemaleddin Mehmed (Cemal Çelebi) worked as a judge and governor, and his daughter Sitti Şah Hatun had a mosque and madrasah built in Istanbul.

== Works ==
Zenbilli Ali Cemali Efendi constantly renewed himself by following scholarly developments. Sources state that he was very interested in books and brought works from various places. His main works are:

- Mukhtarat min al-Fatawa (Fetâvâ-yı Ali Efendi). Various copies of this copyrighted work on Hanafi fiqh can be found in Istanbul libraries (Süleymaniye Lib., Âşir Efendi, n. 138; Esad Efendi, n. 644; Fatih, n. 2387, 2388, 2389; Laleli, n. 1154).
- Mukhtasar al-Hidaya. A work of fiqh.
- Risala Fi Haq al-Dawran (Risâletü'd-deverân). The work states that if the Sufi “dance” is performed for the purpose of dhikr (remembrance of Allah), it is not haram (forbidden). Records state the availability of two copies of the work, one in prose and the other in verse. The copy registered in the Süleymaniye Library (Hacı Mahmud Efendi, nr. 3093/2) with the name Risâle fî cevâzi devrâni'ṣ-ṣûfiyye is in Arabic and in prose.

Although the work on ethics named Adab al-Awsiya is attributed to Ali Efendi, it has been determined that this work was written by his son Zenbillizâde Fudayl Çelebi.
