= Sunizade Seyit Mehmet Emin Efendi =

Ottoman scholar

Sunizade Seyit Mehmet Emin Efendi was a seventeenth-century Ottoman scholar and calligrapher and briefly Shaykh al-Islam.

== Early life and education ==
Mehmet Emin was born in 1614. He was the son of Sun‘ullah Efendi, the qadi of Aleppo, who was also known as Kara Sun‘î, thus Mehmet Emin's patronymic Sunizade, “son of Suni.” Mehmet Emin was said to be a descendant of Emir Sultan on his mother's side; thus his title of seyit. Mehmed Emin completed his education in Istanbul, especially under Azmîzâde Efendi. He became a novice or assistant (mülazım) to Osman Hânî Ömer Efendi.

== Career ==
In 1627, Mehmet Emin began as müderris at the Nişancı Mehmed Paşa (Nişancı Paşay-ı Atîk) Madrasa. In 1630, he was appointed to the Yahya Efendi Madrasa, in 1632 to the Murad Paşa (Murad Paşay-ı Cedîd) Madrasa, in 1634 to the Sahn-ı Semân Madrasa, in 1637 to the Şâh Sultan Madrasa, in 1639 to the Aya Sofya Madrasa, and in 1640 to the Süleymaniye Madrasa.

He was appointed qadi of Salonica in 1641, but was dismissed in 1643. He was appointed qadi of Aleppo in 1646 and of Cairo in 1647, but was dismissed from Cairo in less than a year. He was appointed qadi of Istanbul in 1649, but was dismissed in 1650. He was appointed kazasker of Anatolia in 1654, but retired in 1655. Nevertheless, he was appointed kazasker of Rumelia in 1657. He was dismissed in 1658 and retired into seclusion (inziva). However, he was made kazasker of Rumelia for a second time in 1660.

During his term as kazasker, in February 1662, he was appointed Shaykh al-Islam. According to sources of the period, Mehmed Emin was a “frivolous person” (hafif meşreb) who could not maintain the dignity of his office, and thus was dismissed on the grounds of senility in November 1662. Additional reasons given included “lack of foreign affairs” (umûr-ı hâriciyyesinin bulunmayışı) and the taking of bribes. Some sources mention also his issuance of a fatwa for the execution of qutb of the Melâmiyye Sufi order Sütçü Beşir Ağa and his murids.

Mehmed Emin was said to be skilled in taliq calligraphy, which he learned from Derviş Abdî-i Mevlevi.

== Death and burial ==
Mehmed Emin died in his yalı in Beşiktaş in July 1665. He was buried near the Aziz Mahmud Hüdâyî Dergâh in Üsküdar. His grave was marked with a large turban (kavuk). Because of repairs and enlargements after the 1894 earthquake, Mehmed Emin's grave may now be underneath the dergah mosque.
