= Yekçeşm Hüseyin Efendi =

Ottoman scholar and Shaykh al-Islām

Yekçeşm Hüseyin Efendi (d. 1704) was an Ottoman scholar who was briefly Shaykh al-Islām.

== Early life and education ==
Hüseyin's father was a man named Ahmed from the Hamid Sanjak. Since Yekçeşm means "one-eyed," Hüseyin most likely had a missing eye or an eye with some major problem. At some point, he moved to Istanbul and became connected to the asitâne of Shaykh al-Islām Minkârizâde Yahya Efendi.

== Career ==
Hüseyin was appointed müderris in various educational institutions over the years:

- Halil Paşa Madrasa, 1681
- Kepenekçi Sinan Madrasa, 1685
- Damad Efendi Madrasa, 1687
- Hacı Hasanzâde Dârülifâdesi, 1688
- Gazanfer Ağa Madrasa, 1688
- Sahn-ı Semân Madrasa, 1689

Through the influence of Grand Vizier Köprülüzâde Mustafa Paşa, Hüseyin was appointed qadi of the Ottoman Army (Ordûy-u Hümâyûn) in 1689 and so participated in the recapture of Nish and Belgrade in 1690. In 1691, he was appointed qadi to one of the places named Yenişehir, but was dismissed in 1692. In 1697, he was made qadi in both Edirne and Damascus, but was apparently dismissed in 1698.

During the Edirne Incident of 1703, Hüseyin was in attendance at a council in July at the Shaykh al-Islām's home in Edirne to discuss news of the uprising in Istanbul. Amidst the turbulence, Sultan Mustafa II appointed Hüseyin Shaykh al-Islām of the Ottoman Empire on August 19 or 20. At some point, Hüseyin was sent to the front lines outside Edirne to give orders to the Janissaries who were entrenching there; however, the Janissaries joined the rebellion. Mustafa was deposed on August 22 and replaced by Ahmed III, who appointed a new Shaykh al-Islām. Sources vary on the length of Hüseyin's term in office, from one to three days.

== Exile and death ==
Hüseyin was exiled to Cyprus on August 24, 1703. He died there in February 1704, and was buried near one of the mosques called Hagia Sophia.
