= Mustafa Sabri =

Ottoman Islamic scholar

Mustafa Sabri مصطفى صبرى Effendi
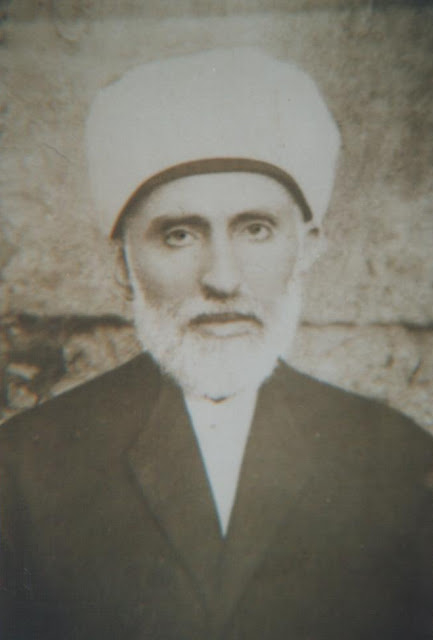

Shaykh al-Islam of the Ottoman Empire
- In office 1919–1920
- Preceded by: Haydarizade Ibrahim Efendi
- Succeeded by: Medeni Mehmet Nuri Efendi

Personal life
- Born: 1869 Tokat, Sivas Vilayet, Ottoman Empire
- Died: 1954 (aged 84–85) Cairo, Egypt
- Era: 19th and 20th centuries
- Main interest(s): Aqidah, Kalam (Islamic theology), Tawhid, Fiqh (Islamic jurisprudence), Usul al-Fiqh, Usul al-Din, logic
- Notable work(s): Mawqif al-'Aql wa al-'Ilm wa al-'Alim min Rabb al-'Alamin ("The Position of Reason, Knowledge, and the Scholar in Regards to the Lord of the Worlds")

Religious life
- Religion: Islam
- Denomination: Sunni
- Jurisprudence: Hanafi
- Creed: Ash'ari

Mustafa Sabri (Ottoman Turkish: مصطفى صبرى افندی; 1869 – 1954) was an Ottoman theologian and university professor who was the penultimate Shaykh al-Islām of the Ottoman Empire. He is known for his opinions condemning the Turkish nationalist movement under Mustafa Kemal Atatürk. Due to his resistance to Atatürk, he lived half of his life in exile in various countries, and died in Egypt.

== Life ==
His father was Ahmed Efendi. He was born in Tokat in 1869. He began his education in his hometown and quickly memorized the Quran. He pursued his education in Kayseri and Istanbul, where he studied under Ahmed Asim Efendi and received his certificate of proficiency (icazetname). He married the daughter of his master Asım Efendi. He passed the Rüus-ı Tedris examination (teaching qualification exam) and became a teacher (müderris) at Fatih Mosque in Constantinople.

From 1898 until 1914, he attended Huzur lessons (lectures and discussions given by the Ulema in the presence of the Sultan). Between 1900 and 1904, he was the librarian (hafiz-i kutub) of Sultan Abdul Hamid II (r. 1876–1909).

After the re-establishment of the Constitution in July 1908, he entered Parliament as the representative of Tokat. From 1908 to 1912, he was the chief editor of the journal Bayan-ul-Haq (The Exposition of Truth), an intellectual journal published by the Cemiyet-i İlmiye (Religious Scholars’ Association). Although he thanked the CUP (Committee of Union and Progress) and the army in an article in the first issue of Bayan-ul-Haq for ending the Hamidian regime, shortly afterwards he joined the opposition to the party.

He became the founding member of the Ahali Fırkası in 1910 and the Freedom and Accord Party in 1911. In 1912, he participated in the foundation of another political organization, the Cemiyet-i İttihad-ı İslamiye (Islamic Union Association).

In January 1913, after the Bab-i Ali coup, he fled to Egypt and then went to Romania, where he made his living teaching Turkish. After the occupation of Romania by Ottoman troops during the First World War, he was arrested and sent to Turkey, where he was imprisoned in Bilecik. He was exiled for a time to Bursa. After the end of the war, he again entered politics and joined Dar-ul-Hikmet-i İslamiye (Islamic University).

He became the Shaykh al-Islām, but he resigned from this post. In 1919, he was appointed as Shaykh al-Islām in the cabinet of Damad Ferid Pasha. Sabri served as the acting Grand Vizier during the absence of Damad Ferid Pasha while he was attending the Paris Peace Conference, and he was nominated to the senate after the fall of Ferid Pasha's cabinet. He became the first president of the Cemiyet-i Müderrisin (Society of Islamic Scholars), which later became the Teali-i İslam Cemiyeti (Society for the Elevation of Islam).

In 1920, Mustafa Sabri was again appointed as Shaykh al-Islām to the second cabinet of Damad Ferid Pasha.

In 1922, he fled Turkey once more to escape arrest by the Turkish National Movement when his name appeared on a list of 150 political dissidents. He went to Romania for a second time where he published the journal Yarın (Tomorrow).

Sabri first went to Romania and then to Greece, where he published an anti-Kemalist newspaper in which he violently attacked the new Turkish regime and its founder, Kemal Atatürk (1881–1938). He later went to Hejaz, before settling in Egypt, where he continued his intellectual activities.

In the early 1930s he went to Egypt, where he stayed until his death on 12 March 1954.

== Works ==
As a conservative scholar, he produced a number of works. In his writings, he opposed both Western secularism and Islamic modernism, which is affected by Westernization. He proposed a program of Islamization before and after the fall of the Ottoman Empire. He remained within the context of the traditional Ash'arite-Maturidite theology and Ottoman madrasa system. In Egypt, he wrote several books in Arabic in response to such modernist thinkers as Muhammad Farid Wajdi and 'Abbas Mahmud al-'Aqqad (Note: According to Oliver Leaman, he criticized 'Abbas Mahmud al-'Aqqad, the author of a literary work on the prophet Muhammad, for praising him because of his "genius" ('abqariyya) rather than because he was a prophet sent by God. Sabri considered such modern readings of Islam as devaluing its divine origin and mission. But he accepted the general outlines of political modernism, especially in regards to such concepts as parliamentary democracy, the rule of law, freedom, and equality.) as well as Jamal al-Din al-Afghani, Muhammad 'Abduh, and Muhammad Mustafa al-Maraghi.

He also criticized the views of some Egyptian intellectuals such as: Qasim Amin, Zaki Mubarak, Zaki Naguib Mahmoud, Mohammed Hussein Heikal, Taha Hussein, and 'Ali 'Abdel Raziq, who remained under the influence of Westernization and interpreted the Islamic religion according to Western thought and values.

He responded to the allegations of the Arab historian Muhammad 'Abdullah 'Inan against the Ottoman Turks and refuted his theses. He insisted that Islam was not in conflict with science and it was a religious obligation to cover women according to certain conditions.

One of the persons that he debated on scholarly issues was Mahmud Shaltut, who took office in various levels and rose to prominence with his reformist thoughts. He objected the fatwa of Shaltut who used the thesis that there is no open expression in Quran and in Hadith that support the ascension and descent of Jesus in such as extend to form the basis of faith and the person who rejected this belief would not be in trouble with in terms of faith. He criticized Shaltut and he gave answers to his assertions and the evidences he used.

Mustafa Sabri criticized Musa Bigiev's thought and called him the "Luther of Islam". According to Sabri, Bigiev was an "eminent scholar", but ultimately could not remain "immune to the disease of European material progress". Sabri also criticized some poets like Jamil Sidqi al-Zahawi and Ahmad Shawqi.

After the abolition of the Sultanate and the position of Shaykh al-Islām in 1922, he published his Al-Nakir 'ala Munkiri al-Ni'ma min al-Din wa-al-Khilafa wa-al-Umma (Arabic: النكير على منكري النعمة من الدين والخلافة والأمة). Completed before the abolition decision was made, Sabri's book mentioned the fate of the caliphate very briefly at the conclusion of his work, only as an additional proof for the arguments already advanced in the book. This work is a strong attack on the Kemalists and their evolving vision for post-Ottoman Turkey.

Sabri presents the Kemalists as decadents, Turkish chauvinists who colluded with the British against Islam and the caliphate, and Kemal Atatürk as a concealed Jew. Although the caliphate is not the main focus of the book, Sabri defends the last Sultan/Caliph and describes the separation of the Turkish government from the caliphate as a premeditated step on the part of the Kemalists to establish a non-Islamic government in Turkey.

In the Mas'alat Tarjamat al-Qur'an (Arabic: مسألة ترجمة القرآن, lit. 'The Issue of Translating the Qur'an'), Mustafa Sabri takes up the issue of using the translation of Qur'anic verses in ritual prayers. The book is a direct response to Atatürk's attempt to have all prayers performed in modern Turkish rather than in their original form in Arabic.

His four-volume magnum opus Mawqif al-'Aql wa-al-'Ilm wa-al-'Alim min Rabb al-'Alamin wa-'Ibadihi al-Mursalin (Arabic: موقف العقل والعلم والعالم من رب العالمين وعباده المرسلين, lit. 'The Position of Reason, Knowledge, and the Scholar in Regards to the Lord of the Worlds and His Divinely Sent Servants') is devoted to a detailed analysis and criticism of many issues of twentieth-century Islamic modernism.

== See also ==
- İskilipli Mehmed Atıf Hoca
- Muhammad Zahid al-Kawthari
- Said Nursî
- Sheikh Said
- Ömer Nasuhi Bilmen
- Muhammad Bakhit al-Muti'i
- List of Hanafis
- List of Ash'aris and Maturidis
- List of Muslim theologians
- List of Sheikh-ul-Islams of the Ottoman Empire
