= Sunnitization in the Ottoman Empire =

Sunnitization in the Ottoman Empire refers to the religious and political authorities' institutionalization of Sunni Islam as the dominant way to practice and interpret Islam in the Ottoman Empire, starting from the second half of the fifteenth century.

Initially characterized by confessional ambiguity, the Ottoman Empire gradually adopted and reinforced Sunni orthodoxy while marginalizing Shi'i Islam, a process caused by military, political, and cultural factors. The implications of Sunnitization extended beyond religious realms, permeating cultural, educational, and legal spheres. Overall, Sunnitization is an integral part of Ottoman history, with its effects still felt in modern Turkey's religious landscape and sectarianism.

== History of Sunnitization in the Ottoman Empire ==
The religious climate of the Ottoman Empire during its first centuries was marked by "metadoxy", a term coined by historian Cemal Kafadar to describe the lack of polarization or a prominent sectarianism in thirteenth and fourteenth century Anatolia. In other words, there was a lack of confessional identity. Islam in the early Ottoman Empire could neither be described as heterodoxy nor as orthodoxy.

From late 15th century and onwards, the Ottoman consolidated Sunni orthodoxy and promoted Sunni Islam as the dominant identity within its borders, marginalizing Shi'i Islam and relevant practices.

Sunnitization in Ottoman Empire fully matured in the second half of the reign of Suleyman I, when the Empire abandoned its project of world dominance and focused on consolidating its power, maintaining its borders, and its internal institutions.

== Causes ==
Different opinions exist regarding the factors that contributed to the development of Sunni Islam in the Ottoman Empire.

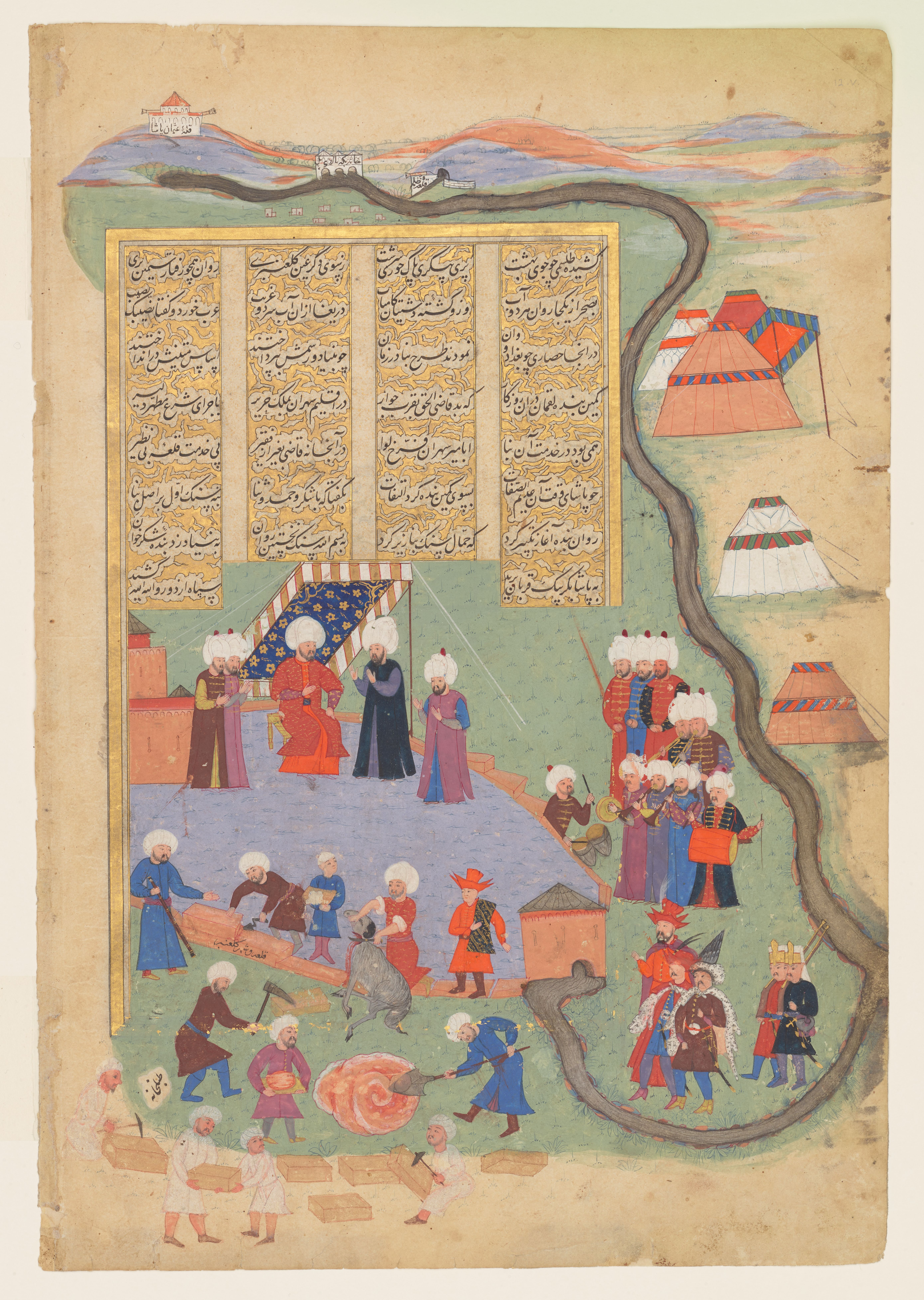
Fortifications along the Ottoman frontier with Safavid Iran

One thesis is that the conquest of Syria and Egypt, dominantly inhabited by Sunni Muslims, from the Mamluks in the early 16th century led to the adoption of Sunni Islam. According to this thesis, Sunni Islam helped the Ottoman state legitimize its rule over Muslims and the Ottoman sultans to acquire a more universal title, the caliph or, in other words, the leadership of the Islamic community.

A more recent thesis suggests that the rise of the Safavid Empire resulted in a Sunni-Shi'a divide, which threatened the Ottoman aspirations to lead the Muslim community. According to this view, this led to the rise of Sunni orthodoxy in the Ottoman Empire as a response to the rise of Qizilbash and Shi'ism amongst Safavids. Some historians have claimed, in a similar fashion, that Safavids adopted and promoted Shi'a practices in response to the Ottoman Sunni orthodoxy.

It has also been argued that the process of Sunnitization was a continuation of earlier trends, such as the rise of Islamic literacy and empowerment of the ulema, and, thus, should not be viewed as solely a political response to the Safavid threat.

== Implications ==
The effects of Ottoman Sunnitization was felt in various dimensions of the Empire, such as architecture, policy, law, education, and culture.

=== Architecture ===
A trend attributed to Sunnitization and increasing compliance with Hanafi jurisdiction is the conversion of Ottoman imarets, which were charitable institutions offering food, shelter, and ritual space, into mosques in the late 15th century, accompanied by the increasing number of masjids in neighborhoods.

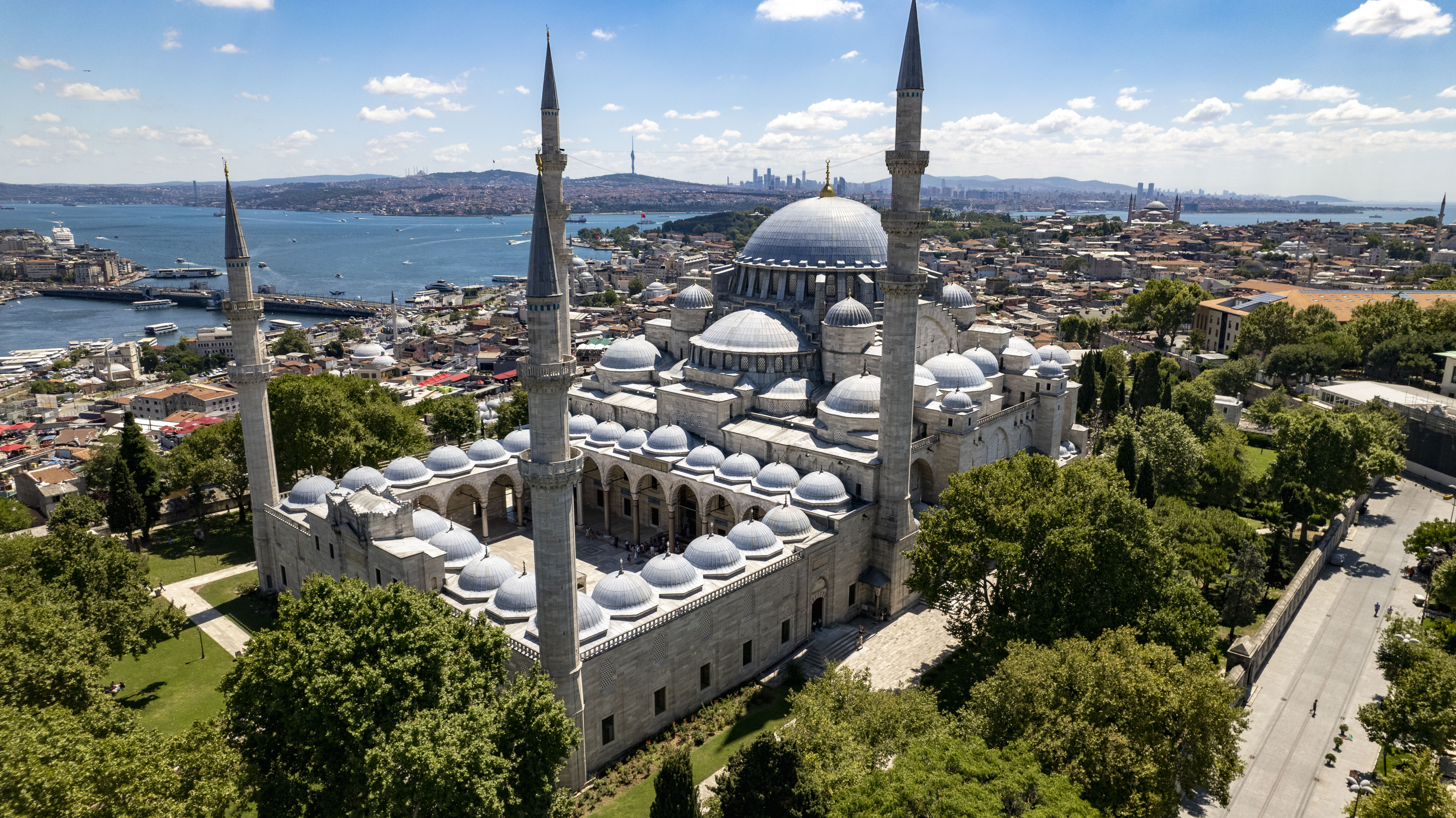
Süleymaniye Mosque, Istanbul

In the 16th century, it also became common for large masjids to be converted into Friday mosques as urbanization gained speed and Hanefi jurists allowed multiple Friday mosques in major cities and their suburbs.

Sunnitization was also visible within the walls of the mosques. For example, the Süleymaniye Mosque in Istanbul was decorated with the names of the first four caliphs according to Sunni belief, which are Abu Bakr, Umar, Uthman and Ali.

=== Legal ===
Sunnitization was enforced and strengthened through laws, policies, bans, and fatwas.

During the 16th century, efforts led by figures like Ebussuud Efendi, an Ottoman Hanafi Maturidi jurist and Shayk al-Islam of Ottoman Empire from 1545 to 1574, aimed to reconcile Ottoman sultanic laws (kanun) with shari’a principles by embedding the language of Hanafi tradition to sultanic laws, which contributed to the standardization and rise of the Hanafi school during this period.

The fatwas of Ebussuud Efendi have particularly played a prominent role in Sunnitization, emphasizing the difference between Sunni and Shi'i Islam. In fact, one of his fatwas declare the killing of Qizilbash as lawful.

The sixteenth century also saw a revival of the concept of heresy and heresiography in an attempt to define heresy and their notion of the right way to practice Islam, which was a response to the Qizilbash and the first war with the Safavids. Scholars who produced heresiographies in the 16th century are Ebussuud Efendi, Kemalpaşazade, and Lütfi Pasha. Often, these heresiographies used historical examples of heresy to indirectly make a case for the present. For instance, Lütfi Pasha defined the true Sunni as obedient to the Sultan in his Risale-i Fırak-i dalle, which was a way to refer to the Şahkulu rebellion and label the Qizilbash as misbelievers. The genre remained popular throughout the 17th century, when second and third Ottoman-Safavid Wars happened.
