= Hüsamzade Abdurrahman Efendi =

Ottoman scholar and calligrapher

Hüsamzade Abdurrahman Efendi, also known as Kocahüsamzade Abdurrahman Efendi or Tulumcuzade Abdurrahman Efendi, was an Ottoman scholar and calligrapher of the 17th century and was briefly Shaykh al-Islām.

== Early life and education ==
Abdurrahman was born in Istanbul in 1594–95. He was the son of Tulumcu Koca Hüsam Efendi, a qadi of Istanbul. After completing his madrasa education, he became an assistant (mülâzım) of Shaykh al-Islām Hocazâde Mehmed Efendi. Later, he studied under various scholars in Egypt, Jerusalem, and Medina. At some point, he became a master taliq calligrapher and archer.

== Career ==
When Abdurrahman returned to Anatolia, he worked as a teacher in various madrasas, such as Sahn-ı Semân, Ayasofya, and Süleymaniye. Between 1640 and 1645, he served as qadi in Aleppo, Damascus, and Istanbul. In 1649, he was appointed kazasker of Anatolia, but was dismissed the following year. In 1652, he was appointed kazasker of Rumelia, but was again dismissed soon after.

After the third dismissal of Ebûsaid Mehmed Efendi from the post of Shaykh al-Islām, Abdurrahman was appointed, in May 1655. During the Çınar Incident of 1656, Abdurrahman recommended against Sultan Mehmed IV's meeting with the rebels and so was dismissed from his post (or requested his own dismissal) in March 1656.

After dismissal, he requested and was given the position of qadi of Jerusalem. He also lived in Damascus for a while. Later, he was made qadi of Aintab and then qadi of Giza. He died in Egypt in September 1670.
