= Constantinople massacre of 1821 =

Massacre that took place in Constantinople, Ottoman Empire (now Istanbul, Turkey)

- Part of the Greek War of Independence
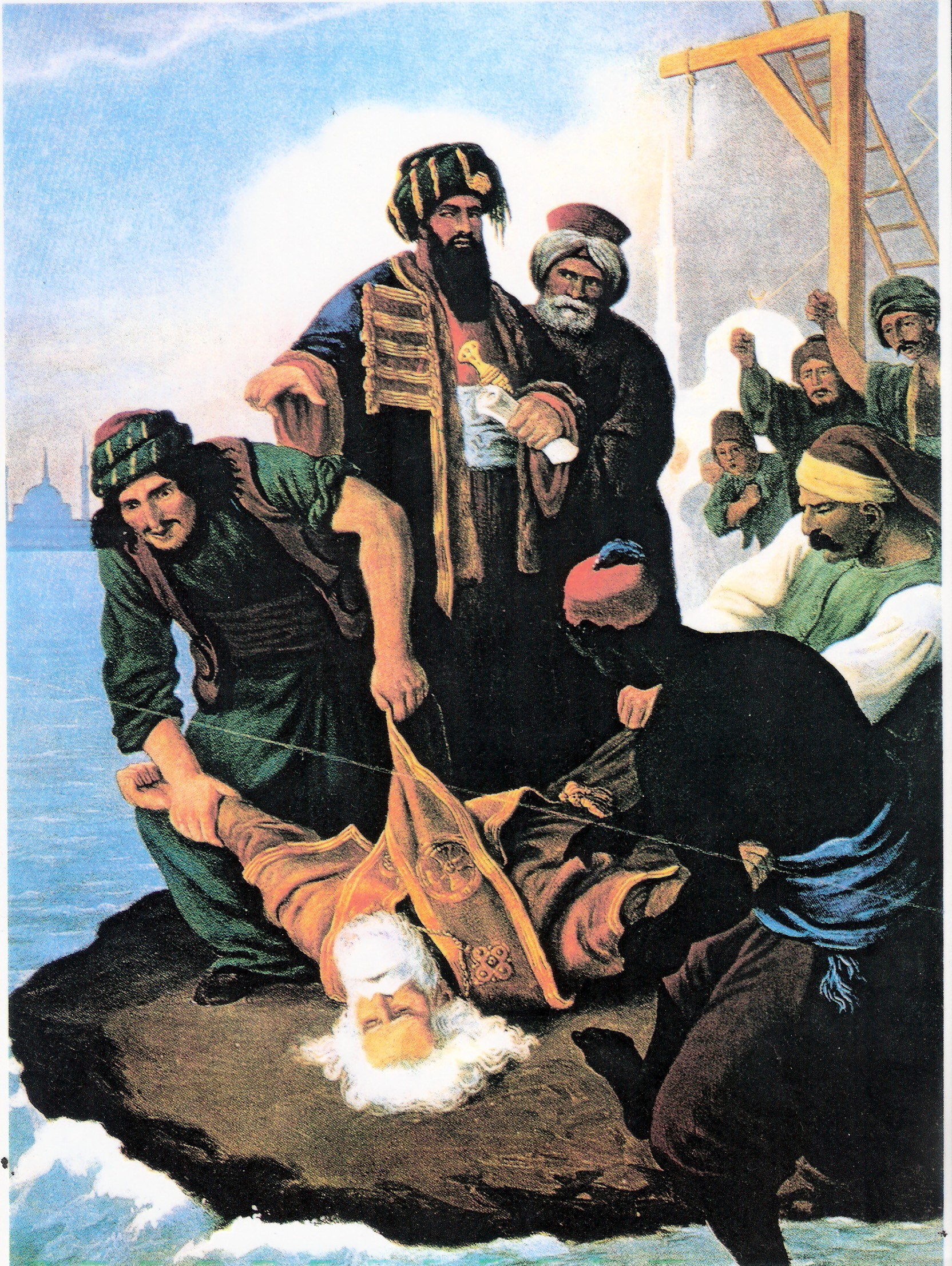
- Painting by Peter von Hess depicting the casting of the corpse of Patriarch Gregory V of Constantinople into the Bosphorus.
- Location: Constantinople, Ottoman Empire
- Date: April–July 1821
- Target: Greek Orthodox Christians
- Attack type: Massacre, pogrom, executions, looting
- Deaths: c. 10,000–30,000
- Perpetrators: Ottoman authorities, Janissaries and other local Turkish mobs
- Motive: Outbreak of the Greek War of Independence

The Constantinople massacre of 1821 was orchestrated by the authorities of the Ottoman Empire against the Greek community of Constantinople following the outbreak of the Greek War of Independence (1821–1830).

As soon as the first news of the Greek uprising reached the Ottoman capital, on 24 March 1821, Sultan Mahmud II ordered his men to kill all Greek Christians in the city. This was initially avoided because of the intervention of the Sheikh-ul Islam, Hacı Halil Efendi and, later, after the latter's dismissal, due to fears of a Russian casus belli.

Nevertheless, although the full extermination of the Greek population of the city was prevented, massacres, mass executions, pogrom-type attacks, destruction of churches, and looting of the properties of the city's Greek population still happened systematically. The events culminated with the hanging of the Ecumenical Patriarch, Gregory V and the beheading of the Grand Dragoman, Konstantinos Mourouzis; the massacre took the lives of around 10,000–30,000 Greek civilians.

== Background ==
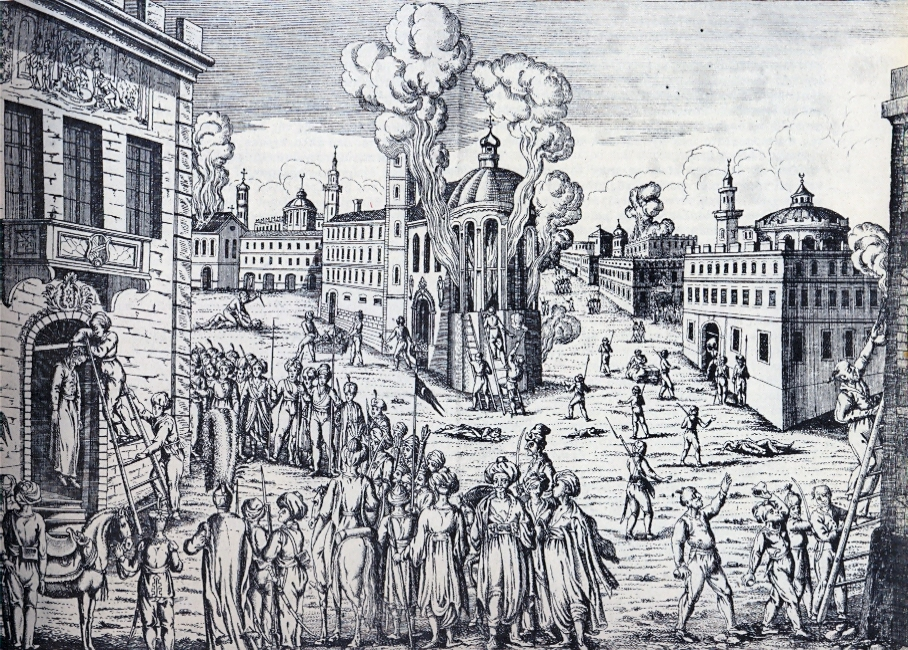
Atrocities committed by Ottoman religious fanatics and Janissaries in Constantinople in the Greek quarter, April 1821

In early March 1821, Alexandros Ypsilantis crossed the Prut river and marched into Moldavia, an event that marked the beginning of the Greek War of Independence.

On 24 March 1821, after news that the Greek War of Independence broke out, Sultan Mahmud II sought to aggress on the Greeks and ordered his men to kill all of the Greek Orthodox inhabitants living in Constantinople, while also asking for a fatwa from the Sheikh-ul Islam, Hacı Halil Efendi to authorize them. When he learned of this, Patriarch Gregory V visited Halil, who asked for proof that only a few Greeks were involved and not the entire nation. Gregory convened the Holy Synod to promulgate an excommunication of those involved in the uprising. This convinced Halil that the entire nation was not guilty and thus he refused to issue the desired fatwa, arguing that the Quran required the sultan to separate the innocent from the guilty. This refusal led the sultan to exile and execute or assassinate Halil. However, the planned extermination of the Greeks in the city didn't materialize due to fears of a Russian casus belli and possible invasion.

Leading personalities of the Greek community, in particular the Ecumenical Patriarch, Gregory V, and the Grand Dragoman, Konstantinos Mourouzis, were accused of having knowledge of the revolt by the Sultan, Mahmud II, but both pleaded innocence.

The Ecumenical Patriarch was forced by the Ottoman authorities to excommunicate the revolutionaries, which he did on Palm Sunday, April, 15 [O.S. April, 3] 1821. Although he was unrelated to the insurgents, the Ottoman authorities still considered him guilty of treason because he was unable, as representative of the Orthodox population of the Ottoman Empire, to prevent the uprising.

== Executions of the Patriarch and the Grand Dragoman ==
Although the Patriarch found himself forced to excommunicate the revolutionaries, he still failed to appease the Ottoman rulers. Later, on the same day as the excommunication, the Sultan ordered the execution of the Grand Dragoman, Konstantinos Mourouzis. He was arrested at the house of the Reis Effendi and beheaded, while his body was displayed in public. Moreover, his brother and various other leading members of the Phanariote families were also executed, although in fact only a few Phanariotes were connected with the revolutionaries.

Despite the efforts of the Orthodox Patriarch to profess his loyalty to the Sultan, the latter remained unconvinced. One week after the excommunication, on Easter Sunday, April, 22 [O.S. April, 10] 1821, he was grabbed by Ottoman soldiers during the liturgy and hanged at the central gate of the Patriarchate. Thus, although he was completely uninvolved with the Revolution, his death was ordered as an act of revenge. His body remained suspended at the gate for three days, and was then handed to a Jewish mob (there had been animosity between the Greek and Jewish communities of Constantinople at the time), dragged through the streets before being thrown into the Golden Horn. The body was eventually picked up by the Greek crew of a Russian ship, brought to Odessa, and fifty years later was brought to Greece, where, on the one hundredth anniversary of his death, Gregory V was formally proclaimed a saint by the Greek Orthodox Church. Gregory's execution caused outrage throughout Greece and the rest of Europe, and resulted in an upsurge of sympathy and support for the rebels in Europe. The gate from which he was hanged remains closed to this day.

== Spread of the massacres (April–July 1821) ==
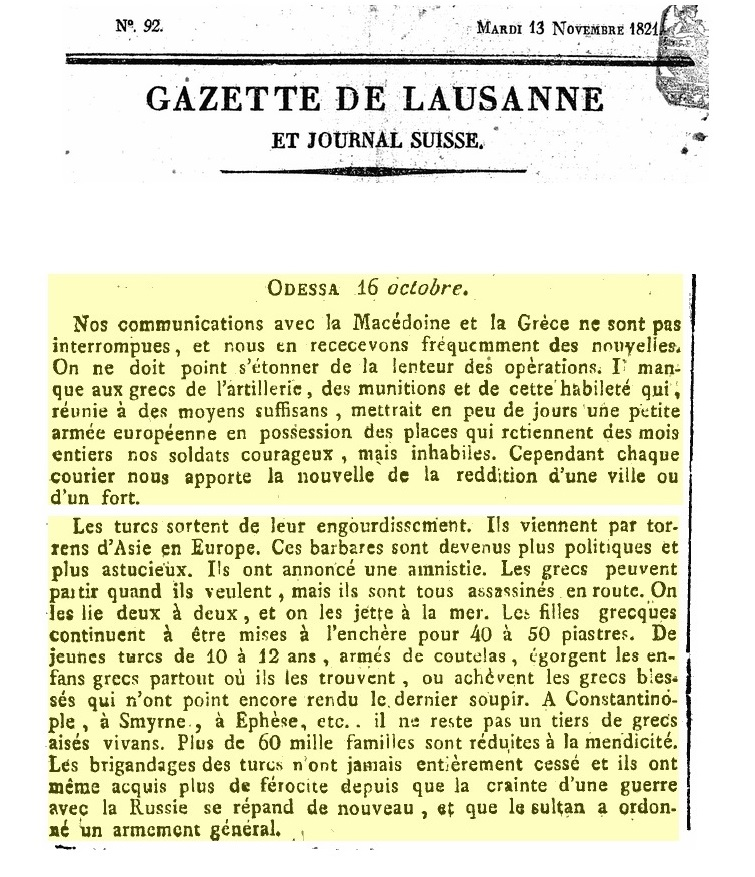
News about the massacre and enslavement of Greeks in Constantinople in 1821, as published in the "Gazette de Lausanne" of Nov. 13, 1821. The correspondence is from Odessa as of Oct. 16, 1821.

On the day of the hanging of Gregory V, three bishops and dozens of other Greeks, high officials in the Ottoman administration, were quickly executed in various parts of the Ottoman capital. Among them were the metropolitan bishops, Dionysios of Ephesus, Athanasios of Nicomedia, Gregory of Derkoi, and Eugenios of Anchialos.

Moreover, the execution of the Patriarch signaled a reign of terror against the Greeks living in Constantinople in the following weeks, while fanatical Muslims were encouraged to attack Greek communities throughout the Ottoman Empire. Thus, groups of fanatical Turks, including janissaries, roamed the streets of the city, as well as the nearby villages. They looted Greek churches and property, initiating a large-scale pogrom. Around 14 Christian churches suffered heavy damage, while some of them were completely destroyed. The Patriarchal complex also became one of the targets. Eugenius II, the newly elected Patriarch, saved himself at the last moment, by escaping to the roof. During this period, the Ottoman authorities sought prominent Greeks from all over Constantinople: in government service, in the Orthodox Church, or members of prominent families and put them to death by hanging or beheading. In addition, several hundred Greek merchants in the city were also massacred.

By May 1821, restrictions on the local Greeks increased, while churches continued to be assaulted. On May 24, Patriarch Eugenius presented a memorandum to the Ottoman authorities, begging them to be merciful towards the Greek people and church, claiming that only a few Greeks revolted and not the entire nation. Eugenius also repeated the excommunication of Gregory toward the revolutionaries. Nevertheless, public executions of Greeks were still a daily occurrence in Constantinople. On June 15, five archbishops and three bishops were executed. Additionally, in early July, seventy shared the same fate. Additionally, 450 shopkeepers and traders were rounded up and sent to work in mines.

== Anti-Greek massacres in other parts of the Ottoman Empire (May–July 1821) ==
The same state of affairs also spread to other major cities of the Ottoman Empire with significant Greek populations. In Adrianople, on May 3, the former Patriarch, Cyril VI, nine priests and twenty merchants were hanged in front of the local cathedral. Other Greeks of lower social status were executed, sent to exile or imprisoned.

In Smyrna, numerous Ottoman troops were staged, waiting orders to march against the rebels in Greece. They entered the city and together with local Turks embarked on a general massacre against the Christian population of the city which amounted to hundreds of deaths. During another massacre in the predominantly Greek town of Ayvalik, the town was burned to the ground, for fear that the inhabitants might rebel and join the revolution in Greece. As a result of the Ayvalik massacres, hundreds of Greeks were killed and many of the survivors were sold for slavery in the Ottoman Empire.

Similar massacres against the Greek population during these months occurred also in the Aegean islands of Kos and Rhodes. Part of the Greek population in Cyprus was also massacred. Among the victims was the archbishop Kyprianos, as well as five other local bishops.

== Aftermath ==
The American newspaper Niles' Weekly Register reported on 21 July 1821 that "The Greeks murdered in Constantinople appear to have amounted to thousands". Historian Spyridon Trikoupis, in 1853, finally arrived at a death toll of 10,000 Greek civilians in the massacre. Author Charlotte M. Yonge later wrote in 1876 that "thousands of Christian families" who had never even heard of the revolution "were slain in their houses". Theologian Thomas Hopko and historian David C. Ford estimate that "as many as 30,000 Greeks in and around Constantinople" were killed.

The British and Russian ambassadors made strong protests to the Ottoman Empire as reaction of the execution of the Patriarch. The Russian ambassador in particular, Baron Stroganov protested against this kind of treatment towards the Orthodox Christians, while his protest climaxed after the death of the Patriarch. In July 1821, Stroganov proclaimed that if the massacres against the Greeks continued, this would be an act of war by the Porte to all Christian states. The public opinion in the European countries was also affected, especially in Russia.

== Legacy ==
The massacre in Constantinople was one of the reasons that triggered massacres against Turkish communities in regions where the uprising was in full swing, such as the massacre in Tripolitsa.

On the other hand, part of the jurisdiction of the Ecumenical Patriarch, secured in 1453, was revoked. The Patriarchate had until then been vested by the Ottoman Empire as the sole representative of the Orthodox communities of the Empire. Apart from leader of the Greek Orthodox millet, the Orthodox Patriarch was also responsible for legal, administrative, and educational rights of his flock. The Patriarchate never recovered from the atrocities that occurred in the city in 1821.

== Motivation ==
The massacres were undertaken by the Ottoman authorities, as a reaction to the outbreak of the Greek Revolution, centered in southern Greece. The victims of these actions were hardly related to the revolution, while no serious investigations were conducted by the Ottoman side in order to prove that there was any kind of involvement by the people put to death.

== Sources ==
- Clair, William St. (2008). That Greece might still be free (New ed., rev., corr., and with additional ill. and updated bibliography. ed.). Cambridge: Open Book Publ. p. 7. ISBN 9781906924003. "massacred+1821+constantinople+greeks."
- Frazee, Charles A. (1969). The Orthodox church and independent Greece: 1821-1852. Campridge University Press.
- Runciman, Steven (1985). The Great Church in captivity : a study of the Patriarchate of Constantinople from the eve of the Turkish conquest to the Greek War of Independence (1st pbk. ed.). Cambridge [Cambridgeshire]: Cambridge University Press. ISBN 9780521313100.
