= List of Sheikh-ul-Islams of the Ottoman Empire =

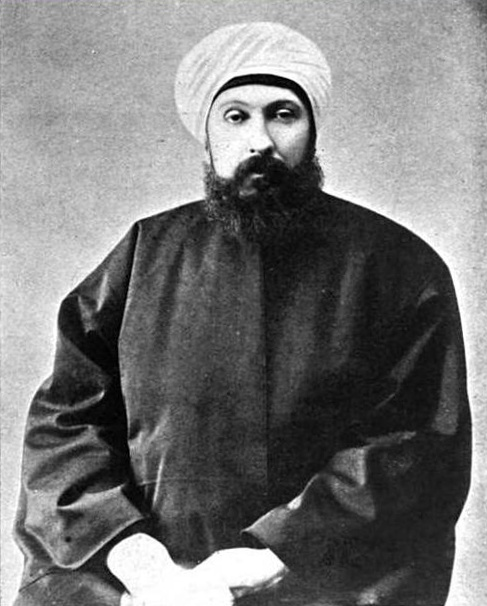
Shaykh ul-Islam Mehmet Cemaleddin Efendi during the reign of Sultan Abdul Hamid II

Following the foundation of the Ottoman state, the title of Sheikh-ul-Islam (Turkish: Şeyhülislâm), formerly used in the Abbasid Caliphate, was given to a leader authorized to issue legal opinion or fatwa. His office was known as the Şeyhülislâm Kapısı, Bâb-ı Fetvâ, or Bâb-ı Meşîhat (The Sheikh's Porte). During the reign of Sultan Murad II, (1421–1444, 1446–1451) the position became an official title, with authority over other muftis in the Empire. In the late 16th century, the Shaykh al-Islam were assigned to appoint and dismiss supreme judges, high ranking college professors, and heads of Sufi orders. Prominent figures include Zenbilli Ali Cemali Efendi (1445–1526), Ibn-i Kemal (Kemalpaşazade) (1468–1534), Ebussuud Efendi (1491–1574) and al-Kawthari (1879–1952).

== Structure ==
The Sheikh-ul-Islam was appointed by the Sultan. His office was known as the Şeyhülislâm Kapısı, or the Bâb-ı Meşîhat, which during the Tanzimat was housed in the old quarters of the Agha of the Janissaries. The office was quite large, the Sheikh-ul-Islams' rank was checked only by the Grand Vizier or the Serasker. Several departments were devoted to the legal systems in Anatolia and Rumeli, which were headed by the Kazasker, or Sadr. Inside this ministry was the Supreme Religious Court (Fetvahane-i Celile) making the Sheikh-ul-Islam the supreme jurisconsult (grand mufti), and as last resort of appeal from lower religious courts. Another department, headed by the ders vekili, supervised the training of ulema and the education of teachers in primary mektebs and secondary madrasas. The fetva emini would issue opinions and judgements. The imperial mint (Darphane), the Ministry of the Sultan's privy treasury (Hazine-i Hassa) and the administration of the holy cities' foundations (waqf) all reported to the Sheikh-ul-Islam, though the 19th century would see these departments separate from the Bab-ı Meşîhat.

Following the Young Turk Revolution the office lost more of its power, which accelerated in the period after 1913. In April 1913, a regulation put religious courts and ulema under closer control from the state and to acknowledge the secular appeals court [Mahkeme-i Temyiz] in many areas of jurisprudence. Standards of education and training were imposed on kadıs, who had to go through a new madrasa in Istanbul to train them. Kadıs were soon under the control of the Ministry of Justice, and madrasas the Ministry of Education. In 1916 the Sheikh-ul-Islam was removed from the cabinet. Like other civil servants, members of the ulema became salaried and started to collect pensions. The next year the authority to administer Sharia courts was put under the Justice Ministry's purview, while the madrasas were modernized and put under the Ministry of Education, and foundations were put into a new ministry: Evkaf until that became a department in the Ministry of Finance. Administration of family law received reform in 1917, codifying Sharia, Jewish, and Christian law regarding family law, and essentially secularizing marriage contracts. This came after a 1916 law allowing women to obtain divorce if their husbands violated their marriage contract.

The Bâb-ı Meşîhat retained its religious consultative functions, or ifta, with a new department: the Dar ul-Hikmet ul-İslâmiye (School of Islamic Wisdom). A Council of Sheikhs [Meclis-i Meşayih], was created to organize and regulate Sufi orders and dervishes. In 1918 after the armistice of Mudros and the dissolution of the CUP the reforms of the Unionists were also disbanded by the governments of the Armistice Era, meaning the Bâb-ı Meşîhat and the Sheikh-ul-Islam regained their power. Upon the declaration of the Turkish Republic, the office was reorganized into the Presidency of Religious Affairs.

== List ==
During the existence of the office (from 1424 to 1922), there were in total 131 Sheikh-ul-Islams. The longest-serving officeholder was Ebussuud Efendi for 29 years, the shortest was Memikzade Mustafa Efendi for 13 hours. The following is a list of Sheikh-ul-Islams of the Ottoman Empire.

- 1. Molla Şemseddin Fenari (1424–1430)
- 2. Molla Fahrettin Acemi (1430–1460)
- 3. Molla Hüsrev (1460–1480)
- 4. Molla Gürâni (1480–1488)
- 5. Molla Abdülkerim (1488–1495)
- 6. Alaettin Çelebi (1495–1496)
- 7. Efdalzade Hamidettin (1496–1503)
- 8. Zenbilli Muhammed Ali Effendi ben Ahmad ben Muhammad El Cemali (1503–1526)
- 9. Kemalpaşazade Ahmet Şemsettin Efendi (Ibn-i Kemal) (1526–1534)
- 10. Sadullah Sadi Efendi (1534–1539)
- 11. Çivizade Muhittin Mehmet Efendi (1539–1542)
- 12. Hamidi Abdülkadir Efendi (1542–1543)
- 13. Fenerizade Muhittin Efendi (1543–1545)
- 14. Ebussuud Efendi ْٰخجا چلبی ابو السعود افندی(1545–1574)
- 15. Hamit Mahmut Efendi (1574–1577)
- 16. Kadızade Ahmet Şemsettin Efendi (1577–1580)
- 17. Malulzade Mehmet Efendi (1580–1582)
- 18. Çivizade Hacı Mehmet Efendi (1582–1587)
- 19. Müeyyetzade Abdülkadir Efendi (1587–1589)
- 20. Bostanzade Mehmet Efendi (1589–1592)
- 21. Bayramzade Hacı Zekeriya Efendi (1592–1593)
  - Bostanzade Mehmet Efendi (1593–1598), 2nd time
- 22. Hoca Sadeddin Efendi (1598–1599)
- 23. Hacı Mustafa Sunullah Efendi (1599–1601)
- 24. Hocasadettinzade Mehmet Çelebi Efendi (1601–1603)
  - Hacı Mustafa Sunullah Efendi (1603), 2nd time
- 25. Ebülmeyamin Mustafa Efendi (1603–1604)
  - Hacı Mustafa Sunullah Efendi (1604–1606), 3rd time
  - Ebülmeyamin Mustafa Efendi (1606), 2nd time
  - Hacı Mustafa Sunullah Efendi (1606–1608), 4th time
  - Hocasadettinzade Mehmet Çelebi Efendi (1608–1615), 2nd term
- 26. Hocazade Esad Efendi (1615–1622)
- 27. Zekeriyazade Yahya Efendi (1622–1623)
  - Hocazade Esad Efendi (1623–1625), 2nd time
  - Zekeriyazade Yahya Efendi (1625–1632), 2nd time
- 28. Ahizade Hüseyin Efendi (1632–1634)
  - Zekeriyazade Yahya Efendi (1634–1644), 3rd time
- 29. Esatpaşazade Ebu Sait Mehmet Efendi (1644–1646)
- 30. Muid Ahmet Efendi (1646–1647)
- 31. Hacı Abdürrahim Efendi (1647–1649)
- 32. Bahai Mehmet Efendi (1649–1651)
- 33. Karaçelebizade Abdülaziz Efendi (1651)
- 34. Esatefendizade Ebu Sait Mehmet Efendi (1651–1652)
  - Bahai Mehmet Efendi (1652–1654), 2nd term
  - Esatefendizade Ebu Sait Mehmet Efendi (1654–1655), 2nd time
- 35. Hüsamzade Abdurrahman Efendi (1655–1656)
- 36. Memikzade Mustafa Efendi (1656)
- 37. Hocazade Mesut Efendi (1656)
- 38. Hanefi Mehmet Efendi (1656)
- 39. Balizade Mustafa Efendi (1656–1657)
- 40. Bolevi Mustafa Efendi (1657–1659)
- 41. Esiri Mehmet Efendi (1659–1662)
- 42. Sunizade Seyit Mehmet Emin Efendi (1662)
- 43. Minkarizade Yahya Efendi (1662–1674)
- 44. Çatalcalı Ali Efendi (1674–1686)
- 45. Ankaravi Mehmet Emin Efendi (1686–1687)
- 46. Debbağzade Mehmet Efendi (1687–1688)
- 47. Hacı Feyzullah Efendi (1688)
  - Debbağzade Mehmet Efendi (1688–1690), 2nd time
- 48. Ebusaitzade Feyzullah Feyzi Efendi (1690–1692)
  - Çatalcalı Ali Efendi (1692), 2nd time
  - Ebusaitzade Feyzullah Feyzi Efendi (1692–1694), 2nd time
- 49. Sadık Mehmet Efendi (1694–1695)
- 50. İmam Mehmet Efendi (1695)
  - Hacı Feyzullah Efendi (1695–1703), 2nd time
- 51. Paşmakçızade Seyit Ali Efendi (1703)
- 52. Yekçeşm Hüseyin Efendi (1703)
  - İmam Mehmet Efendi (1703–1704), 2nd time
  - Paşmakçızade Seyit Ali Efendi (1704–1707), 2nd term
  - Sadık Mehmet Efendi (1707–1708), 2nd time
- 53. Ebezade Abdullah Efendi (1708–1710)
  - Paşmakçızade Seyit Ali Efendi (1710–1712), 3rd term
  - Ebezade Abdullah Efendi (1712–1713), 2nd term
- 54. Mehmet Ataullah Efendi (1713)
- 55. İmam Mahmut Efendi (1713–1714)
- 56. Mirza Mustafa Efendi (1714–1715)
- 57. Menteşzade Abdürrahman Efendi (1715–1716)
- 58. Ebu İshak İsmail Naim Efendi (1716–1718)
- 59. Yenişehirli Abdullah Efendi (1718–1730)
- 60. Mirzazade Şeyh Mehmet Efendi (1730–1731)
- 61. Paşmakçızade Abdullah Efendi (1731–1732)
- 62. Damatzade Ebulhayr Ahmet Efendi (1732–1733)
- 63. Ebuishakzade İshak Efendi (1733–1734)
- 64. Dürri Mehmet Efendi (1734–1736)
- 65. Seyit Mustafa Efendi (1736–1745)
- 66. Pirizade Mehmet Sahip Efendi (1745–1746)
- 67. Hayatizade Mehmet Emin Efendi (1746)
- 68. Seyit Mehmet Zeynelabidin Efendi (1746–1748)
- 69. Ebuishakzade Mehmet Esat Efendi (1748–1749)
- 70. Mehmet Sait Efendi (1749–1750)
- 71. Seyit Murtaza Efendi (1750–1755)
- 72. Abdullah Vassaf Efendi (1755)
- 73. Damatzade Feyzullah Efendi (1755–1756)
- 74. Dürrizade Mustafa Efendi (1756–1757)
  - Damatzade Feyzullah Efendi (1757–1758), 2nd term
- 75. Mehmet Salih Efendi (1758–1759)
- 76. Çelebizade İsmail Asım Efendi (1759–1760)
- 77. Hacı Veliyettin Efendi (1760–1761)
- 78. Tirevi Ahmet Efendi (1761–1762)
  - Dürrizade Mustafa Efendi (1762–1767), 2nd time
  - Hacı Veliyettin Efendi (1767–1768), 2nd time
- 79. Pirizade Osman Sahip Efendi (1768–1770)
- 80. Mirzazade Seyit Mehmet Sait Efendi (1770–1773)
- 81. Şerifzade Seyit Mehmet Şerif Efendi (1773–1774)
  - Dürrizade Mustafa Efendi (1774), 3rd time
- 82. İvazpaşazade İbrahim Bey Efendi (1774–1775)
- 83. Salihzade Mehmet Emin Efendi (1775–1776)
- 84. Vassafzade Mehmet Esat Efendi (1776–1778)
- 85. Mehmet Şerif Efendi (1778–1782)
- 86. Seyit İbrahim Efendi (1782–1783)
- 87. Dürrizade Seyit Mehmet Ataullah Efendi (1783–1785)
  - İvazpaşazade İbrahim Bey Efendi (1785), 2nd time
- 88. Arapzade Ahmet Ataullah Efendi (1785)
- 89. Dürrizade Seyit Mehmet Arif Efendi (1785–1786)
- 90. Müftizade Ahmet Efendi (1786–1787)
- 91. Mekki Mehmet Efendi (1787–1788)
- 92. Seyit Mehmet Kamil Efendi (1788–1789)
  - Mehmet Şerif Efendi (1789), 2nd time
- 93. Hamitzade Mustafa Efendi (1789–1791)
- 94. Seyit Yahya Tevfik Efendi (1791)
  - Mekki Mehmet Efendi (1791–1792), 2nd time
  - Dürrizade Seyit Mehmet Arif Efendi (1792–1798), 2nd time
- 95. Mustafa Aşir Efendi (1798–1800)
- 96. Sâmânizade Ömer Hulusi Efendi (1800–1803)
- 97. Salihzade Ahmet Esat Efendi (1803–1806)
- 98. Şerifzade Mehmet Ataullah Efendi (1806–1807)
  - Sâmânizade Ömer Hulusi Efendi (1807), 2nd time
  - Şerifzade Mehmet Ataullah Efendi (1807–1808), 2nd time
- 99. Arapzade Mehmet Arif Efendi (1808)
  - Salihzade Ahmet Esat Efendi (1808), 2nd time
- 100. Dürrizade Seyit Abdullah Efendi (1808–1810)
  - Sâmânizade Ömer Hulusi Efendi (1810–1812), 3rd time
  - Dürrizade Seyit Abdullah Efendi (1812–1815), 2nd time
- 101. Mehmet Zeynelabidin Efendi (1815–1818)
- 102. Mekkizade Mustafa Asım Efendi (1818–1819)
- 103. Hacı Halil Efendi (1819–1821)
- 104. Yasincizade Abdülvehhap Efendi (1821–1822)
- 105. Sıtkızade Ahmet Reşit Efendi (1822–1823)
  - Mekkizade Mustafa Asım Efendi (1823–1825), 2nd time
- 106. Kadızade Mehmet Tahir Efendi (1825–1828)
  - Yasincizade Abdülvehhap Efendi (1828–1833), 2nd time
  - Mekkizade Mustafa Asım Efendi (1833–1846), 3rd time
- 107. Ahmet Arif Hikmet Bey Efendi (1846–1854)
- 108. Meşrepzade Mehmet Arif Efendi (1854–1858)
- 109. Seyit Mehmet Sadettin Efendi (1858–1863)
- 110. Atıfzade Ömer Hüsamettin Efendi (1863–1866)
- 111. Hacı Mehmet Refik Efendi (1866–1868)
- 112. Hasan Fehmi Efendi (1868–1871)
- 113. Ahmed Muhtar Molla Bey Efendi (1871–1872)
- 114. Turşucuzade Ahmet Muhtar Efendi (1872–1874)
- 115. Hasan Hayrullah Efendi (1874)
  - Hasan Fehmi Efendi (1874–1876), 2nd time
  - Hasan Hayrullah Efendi (1876–1877), 2nd time
- 116. Kara Halil Efendi (1877–1878)
  - Ahmed Muhtar Molla Bey Efendi (1878), 2nd time
- 117. Uryanizade Ahmed Esad Efendi (1878–1889)
- 118. Bodrumlu Ömer Lütfi Efendi (1889–1891)
- 119. Mehmet Cemaleddin Efendi (1891–1909)
- 120. Mehmet Ziyaettin Efendi (1909)
- 121. Mehmet Sahip Molla Bey Efendi (1909)
- 122. Çelebizade Hüseyin Hüsnü Efendi (1910)
- 123. Musa Kazım Efendi (1910–1911)
- 124. Abdurrahman Nesip Efendi (1911–1912)
  - Mehmet Cemaleddin Efendi (1912–1913), 2nd time
- 125. Mehmet Esat Efendi (1913–1914)
- 126. Ürgüplü Mustafa Hayri Efendi (1914–1916)
  - Musa Kazım Efendi (1916–1918), 2nd time
- 127. Ömer Hulusi Efendi (1918)
- 128. Haydarizade İbrahim Efendi (1918–1919)
- 129. Mustafa Sabri Efendi (1919)
  - Haydarizade İbrahim Efendi (1919–1920), 2nd time
- 130. Dürrizade Abdullah Efendi (1920)
  - Mustafa Sabri Efendi (1920), 2nd time
- 131. Medeni Mehmet Nuri Efendi (1920–1922)

== Sources ==
- Yakut, Esra. Şeyhülislamlık: yenileşme döneminde devlet ve din. Istanbul: Kitap Yayınevi, 2005. For a list of şeyḫülislāmları, see pp. 242–247.
- Shaw, Stanford; Shaw, Ezel (1977). History of the Ottoman Empire and Modern Turkey. Vol. II. Cambridge University Press. ISBN 0-521-29166-6.
- Zürcher, Erik (1993). Turkey: A Modern History (2nd ed.). New York, NY: I. B. Tauris. ISBN 1-86064-222-5.
