= Molla Hüsrev =

15th-century Ottoman scholar

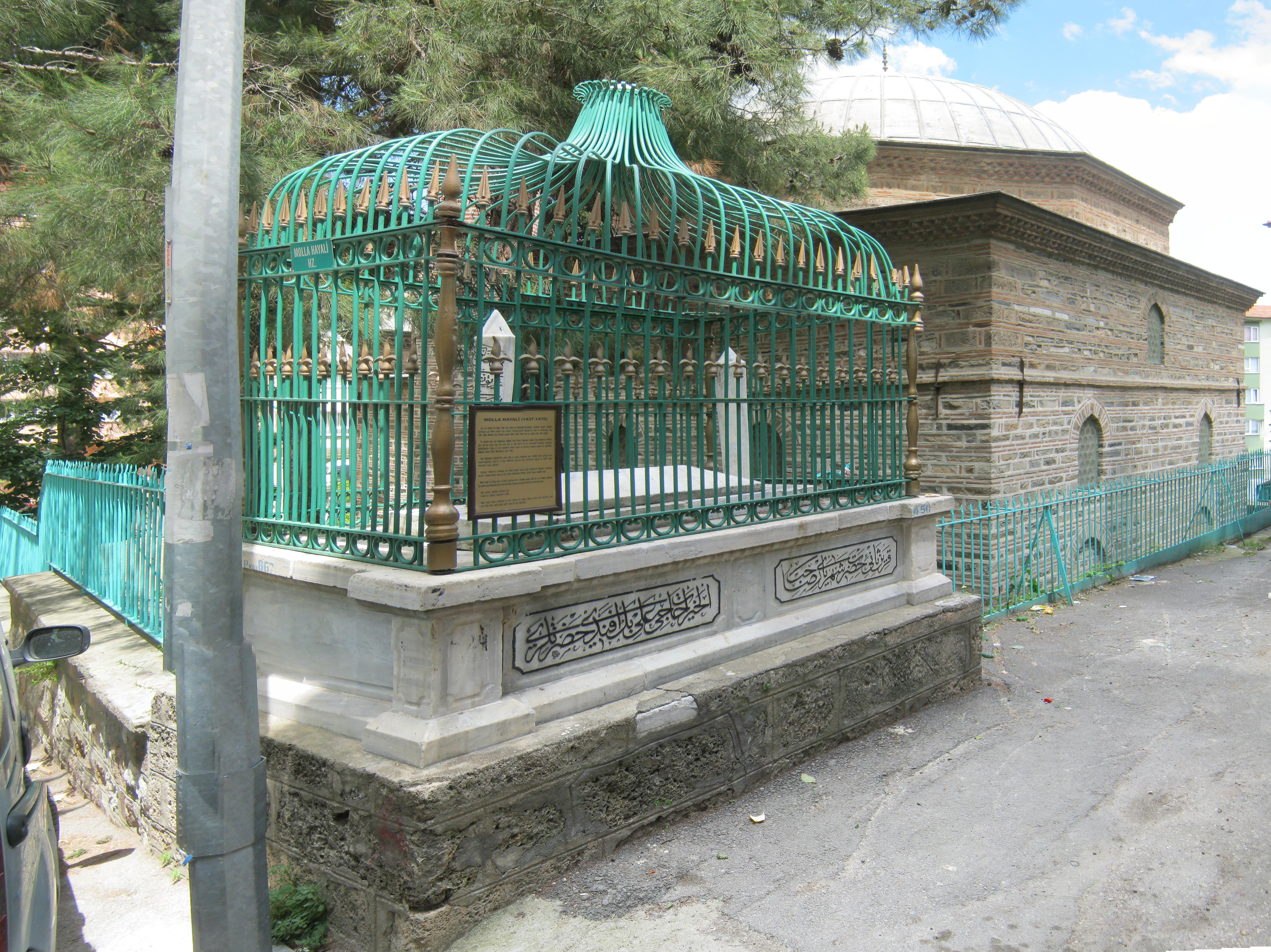
grave of Molla Hüsrev, Bursa

Molla Hüsrev or Mullā Khusraw was a 15th-century Ottoman scholar and mufti.

== Early life ==
He was born possibly in 1397, possibly in the village of Kargın, near Çırçır, Yıldızeli, Sivas (or perhaps in Yerköy, near Yozgat). He was the son of Ferâmurz or Ferâmerz of the Turkmen Varsak tribe of the Sivas-Tokat region. His given name was Mehmed.

Two stories have been given to explain the name Hüsrev. One is that after the death of Ferâmurz, Mehmed was taken in by his sister's husband Hüsrev, because of which he was nicknamed Hüsrev's In-Law (Hüsrev Kaynı), later shortened to Hüsrev. The other is that Mehmed had an older brother named Hüsrev, because of which he was nicknamed Hüsrev's Brother (Ehû Hüsrev), later shortened to Hüsrev.

Hüsrev studied in Bursa, receiving his ijazah from Yûsuf Bâlî, son of Molla Fenârî. He may also have studied in Edirne under Burhâneddin Haydar Herevî (a student of Sa‘deddin et-Teftâzânî), Molla Yegân, and Şeyh Hamza. In addition, he may have studied under Molla Süleyman (another student of Teftâzânî).

== Career ==
Hüsrev's first appointment was as müderris at the Şah Melek Madrasa in Edirne. In 1435–36, he was appointed müderris at the Halebî (Çelebi) Madrasa, also in Edirne. After the abdication of Sultan Murad II in 1444, he was appointed kazasker by Mehmed II. Sometime after Murad's return to the throne in 1446, he left this post, but at some point was appointed qadi of Edirne.

During the conquest of Constantinople, Hüsrev may have been part of Mehmed II's council. In 1453, Hüsrev may have been appointed müderris at the Kalenderhane Madrasa. In the mid-1450s, he was also qadi of Bursa. In 1459, Hüsrev was made qadi of Istanbul and also qadi of Eyüp, of Galata, and of Üsküdar, as well as müderris at the Aya Sofya Madrasa.

In 1472-73 (or 1462–63), Hüsrev left Istanbul for Bursa, apparently because Mehmed showed more favor to Molla Gürâni than to him. In Bursa, Hüsrev purchased or was given land in the Zeyniler neighborhood near the Emir Sultan Mosque. There he built the Molla Hüsrev Madrasa.

In 1467, a year he calls the Great Plague Year (Büyük Veba Yılı), Hüsrev contracted plague.

Sultan Mehmed invited Hüsrev back to Istanbul, probably in 1469, and sometime after 1473 appointed him mufti of Istanbul (later known as Shaykh al-Islām), a position he held until his death.

== Death and legacy ==
Hüsrev died in Istanbul in 1480-81 (possibly October 1480). He was buried on the grounds of his madrasa in Bursa.

Hüsrev was reputed to live modestly despite his wealth and was respected by the people because of his dignified, charitable, and pious demeanor. Sultan Mehmed called him "the Abu Hanifa of our time."

Hüsrev had several institutions built during his life, including the madrasa in Bursa, a han in Bursa, three small mosques (mescit) in Cibali, Vefa, and Sofular in Istanbul, and a fountain (çeşme) in Vefa (one of the oldest Ottoman fountains in Istanbul). The madrasa, han, and Cibali mosque were no longer extant in the 1970s.

Hüsrev's students included Zenbilli Ali Cemâlî Efendi, Fenârî Hasan Çelebi, Molla Hasan Samsûnî, Yûsuf b. Cüneyd et-Tokadî, and Molla Muhyiddin Mehmed Manisalıoğlu.

Hüsrev's great-grandson Husrevzâde Mustafa Efendi (pen name Husrev or Husrevî) was a divan poet, müderris, and qadi.
