= Memikzade Mustafa Efendi =

Ottoman scholar

Memikzade Mehmed Efendi (b. ? - d. 1066 AH/1656 CE), was an Ottoman Islamic scholar, educator, qadi (judge), kazasker, and Shaykh al-Islam for the shortest period in Ottoman history.

He was the son of Amasyalı Mehmed Efendi, one of the scholars during the reign of Sultan Mehmed III, and was known as Memikzâde. He was known in scholarly circles as the son-in-law of Sheikh-ul-Islam Muid Ahmed Efendi. After completing his education and becoming an assistant, he became a professor.

== Career as educator ==
He was assigned to various madrasas: in Rajab 1031 (May 1622) to Tevkiî Câfer Çelebi; in Shawwal 1032 (August 1623) to Nişancı Pasha-i Cedid; in Ramazan 1036 (May–June 1627) to Rüstem Pasha; in Shawwal 1038 (June 1629) to Hoca Hayreddin; in Ramadan 1042 (March 1633) to Ayşe Sultan. In Safer 1044 (August 1634); he was assigned to one of the Sahn-ı Semân madrasas; in Şaban 1045 (January 1036) to Ayşe Sultan Madrasa for the second time with a salary of 60 akce; in Jumada al-Awwal 1050 (September 1640) to Kalenderhane Madrasa. He became a professor in one of the Süleymaniye madrasahs in Receb 1051 (October 1641). He became a qadi (judge) after ten years of service here.

== Career as judge and kazasker ==
Memikzade Mehmed’s first place of duty was as the judge of Quds (Jerusalem), where he was appointed in Zilqada 1052 (February 1643). Although he was given the post of qadi of Egypt in Safer 1054 (April 1644) with the favor of his father-in-law, Rumeli Kazasker Muîd Ahmed Efendi and the initiative of the grand vizier got him dismissed from his duty in the same year in Jumada al-Akhir/August. He became the judge of Galata in Shaban 1056 (September 1646), he was appointed as the judge of Istanbul on 4 Safar 1057 (11 March 1647), and left this post on 22 Shawwal (20 November). After being given the Rumeli rank on 12 Dhu al-Hijjah 1057 (8 January 1648), he became an Anatolian kazasker in Jumada al-Awwal (June) and was dismissed from his post within three months. On 8 Shawwal 1059 (October 15, 1649), he was appointed to the Rumelia kazasker. He was dismissed on 17 Shawwal 1060 (13 October 1650), and on Shawwal 1061 (September–October 1651) he was assigned the beneficiary of Ayntab district.

In Shawwal 1063 (September 1653), he was reinstated as the judge of Rumelia. However, he was dismissed on 12 Zilkada 1064 (24 September 1654) and Pravadi county was assigned to him as a beneficiary. Naîmâ attributes the reason for this dismissal to his abuses, and states that the rumor spread by his librarirans (tezkireciler) together with the Anatolian kazasker Imamzade that Memikzade received gifts especially in the appointment and relocation as qadi spread even in the Divan-ı Hümâyun. A complaint was written on behalf of the ulema in Zilhijce 1064 (October 1654) and delivered through Sheikh-ul-Islam Ebu Said Mehmed Efendi with a request for his dismissal. Memikzade Mehmed’s name was put forth during the investigation on the writer of an unsealed and unsigned petition submitted to Sultan Mehmed IV. On 21 Zilhijce 1064 (2 November 1654), Grand Vizier Dervish Mehmed Pasha, the sheikh al-Islam and two kazaskers were summoned to the presence of Mehmed IV, the case was delivered, and the sultan ordered that the person who wrote the petition be found and punished. Upon the completion of the investigation, it was understood that the petition had been arranged by Memekzade Mehmed and Esiri Mehmed Efendi. They were ordered to return to their beneficiary lands. Memikzade went to Pravadi and Esiri Mehmed to Bozcaada. However, Memekzade’s life of exile did not last long as he returned to Istanbul following his pardon.

Upon the dismissal of shaykh al-Islam Kocahusamzade Abdurrahman Efendi on 9 Cemaziyelevvel 1066 (March 5, 1656) due to the Cinar Incident at Atmeydani, Memekzade was given the position of sheikh-ul-Islam because he was the most senior scholar. However, according to the sources, the soldiers protested strongly against his assignment upon the provocation of some of Hocazade Mesud Efendi's men making negative claims about Memikzade Mehmed’s knowledge and morals. Thereupon, Memekzade was dismissed 13 hours later by the alliance of the notables of the soldiers and exiled to Bursa. Thus he became the shortest serving sheikh al-Islam in Ottoman history.

== Death ==
Memekzade Mehmed did not stay in Bursa for long and was appointed as the judge of Mecca and allowed to go on Hajj (pilgrimage). Memekzade met the new grand vizier Boynuegri Mehmed Pasha on the ways and received compliments from him. He stayed in Aleppo for a while and died there. Şeyhî writes that his grave is in the local of Antakyakapısı in Aleppo.

== Notes ==
- Karaçelebizâde Abdülaziz Efendi, Ravzatü’l-ebrar Zeyli (haz. Nevzat Kaya), Ankara 2003, s. 37, 38, 157, 163, 169, 172, 179-181, 206, 240, 241, 250, 252, 258, 274, 276.
- Vecîhî Hasan, Târih (haz. Ziya Akkaya, doktora tezi, 1957), DTCF Ktp., nr. 9, s. 98, 135, 136.
- Abdurrahman Abdi Paşa, Vekāyi‘nâme (haz. Fahri Çetin Derin, doktora tezi, 1993), İÜ Sosyal Bilimler Enstitüsü, s. 44, 52, 75.
- Naîmâ, Târih, IV, 70-71, 243, 309, 329, 449; V, 416-419, 425-426; VI, 149-151, 156-158, 202.
- Şeyhî, Vekāyiu’l-Fuzalâ, I, 239-240.
- Devhatü’l-Meşâyih, s. 63-64.
- İlmiyye Salnâmesi, s. 466-467.
- Uzunçarşılı, Osmanlı Tarihi, III/2, s. 473.
- A.mlf., Merkez-Bahriye, s. 233.
- Danişmend, Kronoloji, V, 126.
- Ahmet Mumcu, Osmanlı Devleti’nde Rüşvet (Özellikle Adlî Rüşvet), Ankara 1969, s. 144, 258.
