= Great Madrasa (Gjakova) =

Cultural heritage monument of Kosovo

- Medresa e Madhe (Albanian)
- Interactive map of Great Madrasa
- Location: Gjakova, Kosovo

History
- Built: 18th century

The Great Madrasa is a cultural heritage monument in Gjakova, Kosovo.

== History ==
The Great Madrasa (Albanian: Medreseja) is located in the urban hub of Gjakova known as the "Great Čaršija." For centuries, it served as both a religious school and a dormitory for students and imams in Kosovo. It was founded by its first müderris, Veysel Efendi, who oversaw construction that finished in 1748. In 1912, during the Balkan Wars, the building was commandeered to stable troops from the army of the Kingdom of Montenegro. The madrasa was burned and completely destroyed save for an outer wall during the Kosovo War. Built in the Ottoman style, the complex includes a dormitory, classroom, muezzin office, shadirvan, and mosque in addition to the madrasa. All but the muezzin's first-floor office are on the ground floor. Each dormitory has its own veranda. The classroom serves as a library with its own distinctive structure, and there once was a dining hall as well. The muezzin facility is one of the highlights of the complex, featuring a three-console façade with long alcoves and extensive geometric detail: space is included for the muezzin and guests to stay. The mosque is high but lacks a minaret, though a stone slab 1.2 metres (3.9 ft) wide in the southwest corner was supposed to have served as a staging post for the call to prayer. The shadirvan includes four fountains and seating for ablution and rest.
