= Carullah Efendi =

Ottoman Hanafi jurist

Veliyyüddin Cârullah Efendi (1660?-1738) was an Ottoman Hanafi jurist and theologian. He wrote works on hadith, fiqh, creed, tafsir, logic, mysticism, and astronomy.

== Early life ==
Veliyyüddin was born in a village behind the citadel of Yenişehir in 1659-60 (or possibly 1658-59). His father was Mustafa, son of Ali. Veliyyüddin began his education in the village and at age 15 continued his education in the Taşmektep madrasa in Yenişehir. He studied there until he went to study in Istanbul in 1682. In Istanbul, he studied with Abdülvehhâb Efendi, "his master" (üstad), and completed his studies (mülâzemet) with Çatalcalı Ali Efendi.

In 1688, Veliyyüddin left Istanbul. Around age 32, he moved to Mecca. He stayed there for 7 years, for which reason he received the additional name (lakap) Cârullah ("God's neighbor"). In Mecca, he became a follower of Ahmed Yekdest Cüryânî of the Müceddidiyye branch of the Nakşibendiyye order. He also traveled to Medina, Aleppo, Damascus, and Baghdad, received licenses (icazet) from the Halveti, Bektaşî, and Mevlevi orders, and in addition was associated with the Kadiri and Ömeri orders.

== Maturity ==
In 1698 or 1702, Cârullah returned to Istanbul and began teaching.

In December 1702, he traveled to Edirne, where he may have witnessed events of the 1703 janissary revolt.

He was teaching at Feyzullah Efendi's Feyziye Madrasa in Fatih before 1706-07. He was teaching at the Saçlı Emir Madrasa in 1707. He was teaching at the Feyziye Madrasa again in 1716. He was teaching at the Ayasofya Madrasa in 1726-27. He began teaching at the Süleymaniye Darülhadis (hadith school) in 1727-28.

He later served as kadı in Galata and Edirne.

== Death and burial ==
Cârullah died in September 1738 and was buried in the graveyard of a madrasa that he had built.

== Legacy ==
=== Works ===
Cârullah Efendi wrote a significant amount on a variety of topics. His works include

- Tuḥfetü'l-erîb; treatise on a theological debate in Fakhr al-Din al-Razi's work Mefâtîḥu'l-ġayb.
- Ḥâşiye ʿalâ Câmiʿi'r-rumûz; annotation of a work on Hanafi jurisprudence.
- Ḥâşiye ʿalâ Şerḥi Ḥikmeti'l-ʿayn; commentary on a work on logic.
- Hâşiye alâ Şerhi'l-Hidaye fi'l-hikme; a work dealing with philosophy, in which Cârullah Efendi defends the philosophers Ibn Sina and al-Farabi from accusations of heresy

=== Library ===
In 1722, Cârullah donated 800 books to the madrasa of Feyzullah Efendi. These were transferred in 1734 to a library Cârullah had built near the Ayak Madrasas in the Fatih Mosque complex. The total number of books he eventually donated was 2200. (These were later transferred to the Beyazıt Mosque, then to a national library, and finally, in 1963, to the Cârullah Efendi Section of the Süleymaniye Library.)
