= Imaret Mosque, Belgrade =

Mosque in Belgrade, Serbia

The Imaret Mosque (also called the Yahya Pasha Mosque or Sinjirli Mosque; Serbian: Имарет џамија or Синџирли џамија) was an Ottoman mosque in Belgrade, built by Yahyapaşazade Mehmet Pasha around 1548, destroyed in the 1870s.

== Construction ==
While sancakbeyi of Semendire, Yahyapaşazade Mehmet Pasha stated that he would establish a large endowment in Belgrade. Between 1528 and 1536, Sultan Süleyman granted him plots of land in Belgrade and several villages around Belgrade, and in 1537, plots of land and estates in and around Pojega. These lands became the source of income for his Belgrade foundation (waqf). The complex (külliye) included a mosque, a mekteb, a medrese, an imaret, a kervansaray, a sebil, a çeşme for drinking water, Yahyapaşazade's türbe, a musalla, and a tekke. The inscription on the mosque gave the construction date as 1548-49. According to Evliya Çelebi, the mosque was "the pride of the city of Belgrade."

The imaret (public kitchen) that eventually gave the mosque its name was set up to 120 people a day, including kervansaray guests, foundation staff and their families, medrese students, and the city poor. The Imaret Medrese was built for 40 regular students and 12 or 13 dânişmends (higher-level students). It was sometimes called Medrese-i Arslan Paşa, after Yahyapaşazade's son Arslan.

The complex was located in the Lower Pazar or Bitpazar, in what is now the block bounded by Dušana, Dubrovačka, Skenderbegova, and Knićaninova Streets.

== History ==
Münirî Belgradî, müderris of the medrese and poet, was buried in the courtyard of the mosque, possibly in 1617. Abdurrahim Efendi, mufti of Belgrade and former Şeyhülislâm, was buried behind the mihrap of the mosque in 1656.

During the "Disaster Years," the foundation supporting the mosque began to decline. It lost an important part of its income when the Ottomans were expelled from Pojega in 1684-85. During the Belgrade sieges of 1688 and 1690, many foundation buildings were destroyed and damaged. In 1741, Mahmud I took back the foundation's Semendire lands, dooming the foundation.

During the Austrian occupation of Belgrade from 1717 to 1739, mosques were used as churches or warehouses. The imaret next to the Imaret Mosque was destroyed. The mosque itself was used as an arsenal and gunpowder store from 1717 to 1721, and was later assigned to the Franciscan order and made into a church, or in 1728 was used as a warehouse for military uniforms.

After the restoration of Ottoman rule in 1739, the Imaret Mosque was partially repaired by the state with funds from customs revenues. In 1741, the foundation of Hatibzade Yahya Pasha rebuilt the mosque completely and took over the payment of salaries. The mosque continued in use into the 19th century, when it was known as the Sinjirli Mosque (Turkish: Zincirli, "chained"), because of the chains hung at its doors (reportedly to prevent the entry of cattle) and because of the chains hung around its minaret to hold lamps which burned all night long.

The mosque was demolished sometime between 1870 and the independence of Serbia in 1878.
