= Ebussuud Efendi =

Ottoman chief jurist (1490–1574)

Ebussuud Efendi al-Mu'allim al-Thani (The Second Teacher)
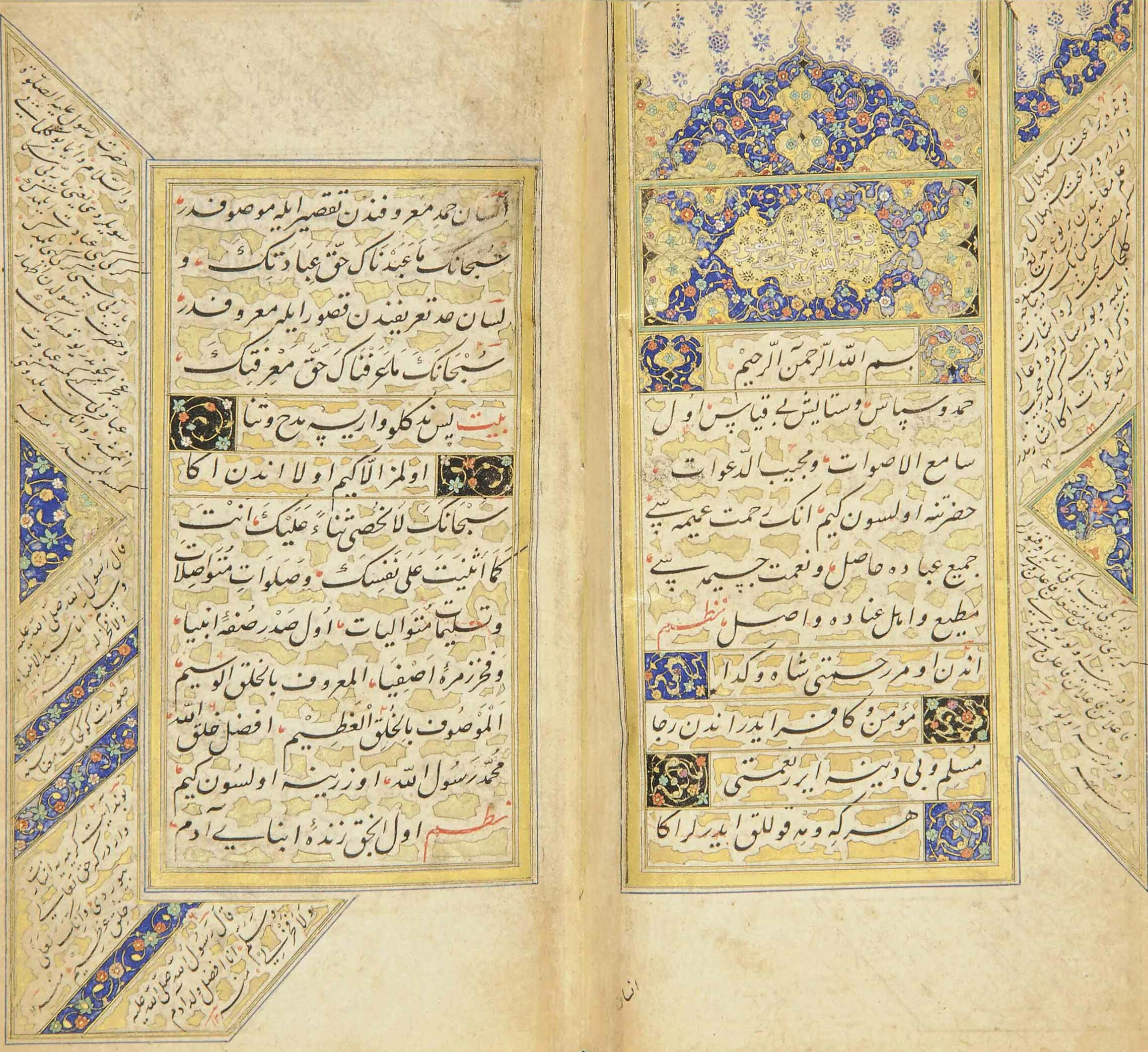
- An early copy of Ebussuud's Du'anama ("Book of Prayers"), signed Muhammad Amin al-Husayni al-Tirmidhi, created in Ottoman Turkey, dated 1599–1600

Ottoman Shaykh al-Islām
- In office October 1545 – 23 August 1574
- Monarchs: Suleiman I; Selim II
- Preceded by: Fenarîzade Muhyiddin Çelebi
- Succeeded by: Çivizade Damadı Hamid Efendi

Kazasker of Rumelia
- In office August 1537 – October 1545
- Monarch: Suleiman I
- Preceded by: Muhyiddin Efendi

Islamic Judge (Kadi) of Istanbul
- In office November 1533 – August 1537
- Monarch: Suleiman I

Personal details
- Born: Mehmed Ebussuud El- İmadi bin Mutasavvıf Muhyiddin Mehmed; 30 December 1490 İskilip, Rûm Eyalet, Ottoman Empire
- Died: 23 August 1574 (aged 83) Ḳosṭanṭīnīye, Ottoman Empire
- Resting place: Eyup Sultan Mezarligi,Istanbul
- Spouse: Zeyneb Hanım
- Parent: Mutasavvıf Muhyiddin Mehmed (father)

Ebussuud Efendi (Turkish: Mehmed Ebüssuûd Efendi, 30 December 1490 – 23 August 1574), was a Hanafi Maturidi Ottoman jurist and Quran exegete, served as the Qadi (judge) of Istanbul from 1533 to 1537, and the Shaykh al-Islām of the Ottoman Empire from 1545 to 1574. He was also called "El-İmâdî" because his family hailed from Imâd, a village near İskilip.

Ebussuud was the son of Iskilipli Sheikh Muhiddin Muhammad Efendi. In the 1530s, Ebussuud served as a judge in Bursa, Istanbul and Rumelia, where he brought local laws into conformity with Islamic divine law (sharia). Sultan Suleiman the Magnificent promoted him to Shaykh al-Islām – the supreme judge and highest official – in 1545, an office Ebussuud held until his death and which he brought to the peak of its power. He worked closely with the Sultan, issuing judicial opinions that legitimised Suleiman's killings of Yazidis and his successor Selim's attack on Cyprus. Ebussuud also issued legal rulings (fatwās) which labeled the Qizilbash, regardless of whether they lived on Iranian or Ottoman soil, as "heretics", and declared that killing them would be viewed as praiseworthy, rather than just being allowed according to the law.

Together with Suleiman, the "Lawgiver", Ebussuud reorganized Ottoman jurisprudence and brought it under tighter governmental control, creating a legal framework joining sharia and the Ottoman administrative code (qānūn). While the previously prevailing opinion held that judges were free to interpret sharia, the law that even the ruler was subject to, Ebussuud instituted a framework in which the judicial power was derived from the Sultan and which compelled judges to follow the Sultan's qānūn-nāmes, "law-letters", in their application of the law.

In addition to his judicial reforms, Ebussuud is also remembered for the great variety of fatwās he issued. His opinions allowing Karagöz plays and the consumption of coffee, a novelty at the time, are particularly celebrated. He is also known for a widely-contested fatwā permitting monetary dealings involving riba (interest) in certain situations. This opinion is often referenced by contemporary Muslim modernists.

== Fatwā Compilation ==
Ebussuud’s work includes Tafsir of the Quran, jurisprudential commentaries, dictionaries and treatises on mysticism, Arabic grammar, literature and poetry. He is best known for his juristic opinions in thousands of fatwās that he composed during his thirty-year career as the Shaykh al-Islām.

Ebussuud formed a department (fatwā-khāna) in the office of Shaykh al-Islām and systematized the process of issuing fatwās which was largely informal before his period in office. The chief function of Shaykh al-Islām was to issue fatwās in response to legal questions from the Sultan, his ministers, governors or judges, or from members of the public seeking out-of-court settlements or simply answers to queries. Ebussuud established a high level of bureaucratic division of labor, where scribes (fatwā katibi) with legal training and experience drafted questions according to predetermined technical and rhetorical standards, and clerks (fatwā emini), legal scholars with high-level madrasa appointments, sometimes provided provisional answers to these questions before they were presented to the Shaykh al-Islām. Ebussuud composed a manual, titled ‘Advice to Fetva Scribes’ (Fetva Katiblerine Tenbih), about how to draft fatwās in ways that would allow queries to be answered precisely, unequivocally, and in the fewest possible words. Ebussuud’s reform of the procedure of composing fatwas allowed the office of Shaykh al-Islām to develop a standardized style of Ottoman fatwā documents and issue large volumes of them in relatively short periods of time.

Ebussuud’s fatwās collections, known as Ma‘ruḍāt, have received considerable attention in modern scholarship and were heavily cited and quoted by generations of legal scholars who came after him. Ebussuud wrote fatwās on contemporary issues of various kinds such as ritual prayer, ablution, contracts, religious foundations, and the practices of Ṣūfīs. The importance of his fatwās lies in the systematization of Ottoman jurisprudence. He formulated the imperial land and tax systems and aligned them with Hanafi jurisprudential traditions. He also shaped many aspects of Ottoman legal practices including the institution of cash-waqf. His legal opinions in fatwās did not always legitimize or side with state preferences. He, for example, declared that certain regulations in Ottoman law contradicted religious law, such as collection of poll tax from peasants without lands, torturing suspected criminals, and levying taxes on pigs. While Ebussuud’s contributions to the Ottoman land and tax codes have garnered great interest in modern historiography, his opinions on those issues occupied a limited space in his fatwas. Instead, two broadly defined foci in Ebussuud’s fatwās were economic concerns, such as contractual and property-related issues, and religious-doctrinal, communal (including non-Muslims) and family matters.

Scholars refer to collections of Ebussuud’s fatwās as Mecmuatu¨’l Fetava (‘Collection of Fatwās’) by Ebussuud, Fetava Ebussuud, or Fetava-yı Ebussuud. Multiple versions of Ebussuud’s fatwās compiled by different individuals exist in Turkish archives and manuscript libraries.

In addition to his fatwā compilation, Ebussuud was also outstanding as an exegete. He completed a commentary on the whole of the Qurʾān, Irshādu-l-‘Aqqli-s-Saleem ilā Mazāyā Al-Kitaabi-l-Kareem in 1566. For this, Sultan Suleiman granted him awards and sent copies of this work to Mecca and Medina to spread his fame outside of the Ottoman world. Later scholars like Sayyid Muhammad Anwar Shah Kashmiri, Sayyid Muhammad Yusuf Banuri, and Mufti Muhammad Taqi Usmani considers his Tafseer one of the top four commentaries of the Qur'an. He also wrote commentaries and super-commentaries on theological texts like al-Taftazānī's Talweeḥ and al-Nasafī's Manār.
