= Zaki Mubarak =

Egyptian writer

Zaki Mubarak زكي مبارك
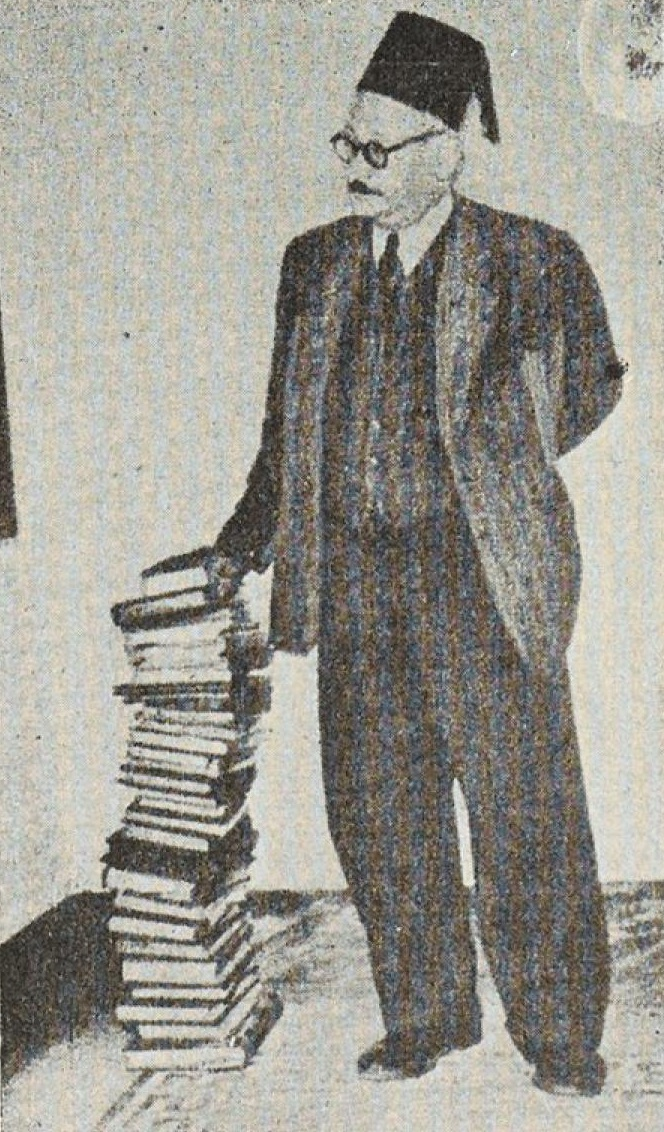
- Born: 5 August 1892
- Died: 23 January 1952 (aged 59)
- Occupations: Writer, poet, journalist

Zaki Mubarak (Arabic: محمد زكي عبد السلام مبارك, romanized: Muḥammad Zakī ‘Abd al-Salām Mubārak; 5 August 1892 – 23 January 1952) was an Egyptian Arab writer, poet, journalist and academic. He held three doctorate degrees. He taught at the Egyptian University for several years and worked as an inspector general for the Arabic language.

== Biography ==
Zaki Mubarak was born in the village of Santris, Markaz of Ashmoun, Monufia Governorate in 1892. In 1908 he enrolled in Al-Azhar University and obtained a certificate of eligibility from it in 1916, a Bachelor of Arts from the Egyptian University in 1921, and a doctorate in literature from the same university in 1924.

He obtained a postgraduate diploma in literature from National Institute for Oriental Languages and Civilizations, in Paris in 1931 and a doctorate in literature from the Sorbonne University in 1937.

Taha Hussein was the reason for his leaving the university without a job and without a salary on the streets, although he had three doctorates and authored more than forty books. He was allowed to work at the Egyptian University, and he worked at the American University and was appointed as an inspector for foreign schools in Egypt. However, he did not settle for this job, and was expelled from it after Mahmoud El Nokrashy came as minister of education and Abdel Razzak Al Sanhuri as undersecretary of the ministry.

Mubarak worked in the press for many years, and wrote about a thousand articles for Al-Balagh newspaper and other newspapers on various topics.

In 1937, he was assigned to Iraq to work in the Higher Teachers' House, he was pleased in Iraq to get to know many of his notables and his friendship with them. Despite the honor he received in Iraq, he continued to feel the injustice in Egypt, and he expressed this by saying, "My salary in the Ministry of Education is not enough, and I complete it with the reward that I receive from Al-Balagh, as a wage for articles like which no writer would write, even if he dipped his hands in black ink... children of Adam are traitors. You compose forty-five books, two of which are in French, and you publish a thousand articles in Al-Balagh, and you become a doctor, yet you remains an inspector at the Ministry of Education."

== Awards ==
- Al-Rafidain Medal, Iraq, 1947

== Death ==
On January 22, 1952, Mubarak fainted while he was on Emad El-Deen Street and injured his head. He was taken to the hospital, where he remained unconscious until he died on January 23, 1952. However, al-Zirikli mentions that his cause of death was a fatal concussion after being run over by a horse-drawn carriage. He was buried in his hometown, Santris.

== Works ==
- The Tears of lovers (Arabic: madamie aleashaaq)
- The Artistic Prose in the Fourth Century (Arabic: alnathr alfaniyu fi alqarn alraabie)
- The Genius Al Sharif Al Radi (Arabic: eabqariat alsharyf alrady)
- Night Talking and Conversations (Arabic: al'asmar wal'ahadith)
- Islamic Mysticism in Literature and Ethics (Arabic: altaswf al'iislamiu fi al'adab wal'akhlaq)
- Ethics According to Al-Ghazali (Arabic: al'akhlaq eind alghazalii)
- The Balance Between Poets (Arabic: almuazana bayn alshueara')
- Memories of Paris (Arabic: dhikrayat baris)
- Three lovers (Arabic: aleushaaq althalatha)
- Baghdad Inspiration (Arabic: wahi baghdad)
- Leila Sick in Iraq (Arabic: laylaa almarida fi aleiraq)
- Ibn Abi Rabi'ah Love (Arabic: hubu abn 'abi rabiea)
- Language, Eeligion and Traditions (Arabic: allugha waldiyn waltaqalid)
- Ahmed Amin's Felony on Arabic Literature (Arabic: jinayat 'ahmad 'amin ealaa al'adab alearabii)
