= Çerkes Halil Efendi =

Ottoman chief jurist (d. 1821)

Personal life
- Born: Seyyid Mehmed Salih
- Died: 1821 Istanbul, Ottoman Empire
- Known for: Refusing to approve a fatwa for the massacre of Greeks
- Occupation: Sheikh ul-Islam

Çerkes Halil Efendi (Halil Efendi the Circassian) or Hacı Halil Efendi (Halil Efendi the Hajji) was an 18th- and 19th-century Ottoman government official and scholar of Circassian descent. He was şeyhülislam for about 19 months.

== Early life ==
Halil was the son of the Circassian wetnurse of Mustafa III’s daughter Hibetullah Sultan. At his mother’s request, Halil was brought from Circassia as a child and grew up in the imperial harem with Mustafa III’s son Selim.

== Adult career ==
During the reign of Abdulhamid I, from 1774 to 1789, Halil was transferred to the Treasury Ward of the palace and so was separated from Selim for about fifteen years.

When Selim became sultan in 1789, Halil was appointed steward (kethüdâ) of the treasury. Around this time, Selim apparently also gave him the Circassian woman Zîbâ Hanım (former concubine (müstefreşe) of Hoca Abdullah Ağa) as odalisque (odalık). At some point, Halil married Zîbâ. Halil also seems to have had a second wife, Züleyha, and two concubines, Nazende and Seyyare.

In 1801, Halil left the palace to join the Galata Mevlevi order and become a religious scholar. In 1803, he performed the hajj and was given the title of kadı of Mecca. On his return, he was given the title of kadı of Istanbul, and soon after, kazasker of Anatolia. In 1809, he was given the title of kazasker of Rumelia. He participated in the imperial consultative assembly (meclis-i meşveret) under the title of kazasker. In 1813, he became the kazasker of Rumelia in fact, but was dismissed in 1819.

On September 3, 1819, he was appointed şeyhülislam. Halil was said to have had a hard temperament, to have been outspoken, but to have had a deep knowledge of tafsir, hadith, and other religious sciences.

During his time in office, Halil had disputes with Hâlet Efendi, who was influential with the sultan at the time, Mahmud II. During a consultation regarding the Greek rebellion of 1821, an argument broke out between Halil and Hâlet, concerning how much responsibility Hâlet held for the rebellion, leading to an exchange of insults. After this, Halil’s wife Zîbâ encountered Hâlet’s wife Lebibe Hatun in a park (mesire) in Beylerbeyi and tried to discuss the argument, but this led to a fight between the two women.

On 24 March 1821, after news that the Greek War of Independence broke out, Sultan Mahmud II sought to aggress on the Greeks and ordered his men to kill all of the Greek Orthodox inhabitants living in Constantinople, while also asking for a fatwa from Halil to authorize them. When he learned of this, Patriarch Gregory V visited Halil, who asked for proof that only a few Greeks were involved and not the entire nation. Gregory convened the Holy Synod to promulgate an excommunication of those involved in the uprising. This convinced Halil that the entire nation was not guilty and thus he refused to issue the desired fatwa, arguing that the Quran required the sultan to separate the innocent from the guilty. This refusal led the sultan to exile and execute or assassinate Halil. However, the planned extermination of the Greeks in the city didn't materialize due to fears of a Russian casus belli and possible invasion.

Halil was dismissed as şeyhülislam on March 28, 1821 and was put under house arrest in his yalı in Beylerbeyi. The next day, he and Zîbâ were exiled to Bursa. Halil’s steward, Hacı Sadık Efendi, was exiled to Rhodes. On May 16, on the grounds that Halil was in communication with Istanbul, Hâlet had Halil exiled to Karahisar-ı Sahib. Halil took a staff of ten with him, including three cooks and one groom (seyis). Some time later, his concubines were also sent to him; Zîbâ, however, had to remain in Bursa.

Meanwhile, Hâlet had a black lamb with its mouth sewn shut buried in the stable of Halil’s Istanbul mansion. Hâlet then had the dead lamb, supposedly found by chance, sent to the palace, leading to the accusation that Zibâ was practicing witchcraft. Hâlet was thus able to have Zîbâ strangled and have her naked corpse thrown into a thicket or some bushes (çalılık).

== Death and burial ==
On receiving the news of his wife’s death, Halil became ill, was paralyzed, and died soon after, in Karahisar on August 2 (or 12), 1821. He was buried next to the Gedik Ahmed Paşa Mosque in Karahisar (now Afyon).

== Legacy ==
Halil left behind a sizable estate.

Halil trained many students, including Sahaflar Şeyhizâde Mehmed Esad Efendi.

Halil is said to have established well-funded foundations for early morning Quran reading in Eyüp Mosque during Ramadan in memory of himself and his wife and for an annual mevlit reading in the palace Treasury Ward. He is also said to have done charitable works in the Hijaz.
