= Medeni Mehmet Nuri Efendi =

Last shaykh-ul-Islam of the Ottoman Empire from 1920 to 1922

Seyyid Medeni Mehmet Nuri Efendi

Personal life
- Born: November 24, 1859 Sultantepe, Üsküdar, Istanbul, Ottoman Empire
- Died: July 29, 1927 (aged 67) İhsaniye, Üsküdar, Istanbul, Turkey
- Spouse: Şerife Hatice Fehime Hanım
- Children: Three daughters, one son
- Parent(s): el-Hajji es-Seyyid Tarsusizade Osman Kamil Efendi, Fındıkzade Şerife Hatice Hanım
- Main interest(s): Islamic jurisprudence, Quranic studies
- Occupation: Islamic scholar, qadi (judge), Sheikh-ul-Islam

Religious life
- Religion: Islam
- Denomination: Sunni
- Jurisprudence: Hanafi

Seyyid Medeni Mehmed Nuri Efendi (24 November 1859 – 29 July 1927) was an Islamic scholar, qadi (judge), and the last Sheikh al-Islam of the Ottoman Empire.

== Biography ==
Medeni Mehmed Nuri was born on November 24, 1859, in the Sultantepe neighborhood of Üsküdar district, Istanbul. His father was el-Hajji es-Seyyid Tarsusizade Osman Kamil Efendi of Istanbul and lived in the city between 1821 and 1896. He was the head of the "Tetkikat-ı Shar'iyye Council" when he died and was military ranked in Anatolia and Rumelia. Medeni Mehmed Nuri's mother was Fındıkzade (Fındıkgil) Sherife Hatija Hanım. Nuri Efendi grew up in the Vefa district of Istanbul, started his primary education with his father, graduated from the Şehzade and Fatih Mosque madrasas and "Mekteb-i Nüvvab", and became an Istanbul professor. He rose over time and received the Mahreç rank.

At the age of 22, he started to work with a ru'us salary and gradually rose in various institutions of the Ottoman legal system becoming the qadi (judge) of Egypt in 1912. Between March 1912 and August 1915, he lived in Cairo and served as the judge of Egypt. Later he was appointed as the central qadi of the Adana province. He also served as the Minister of Evkaf.

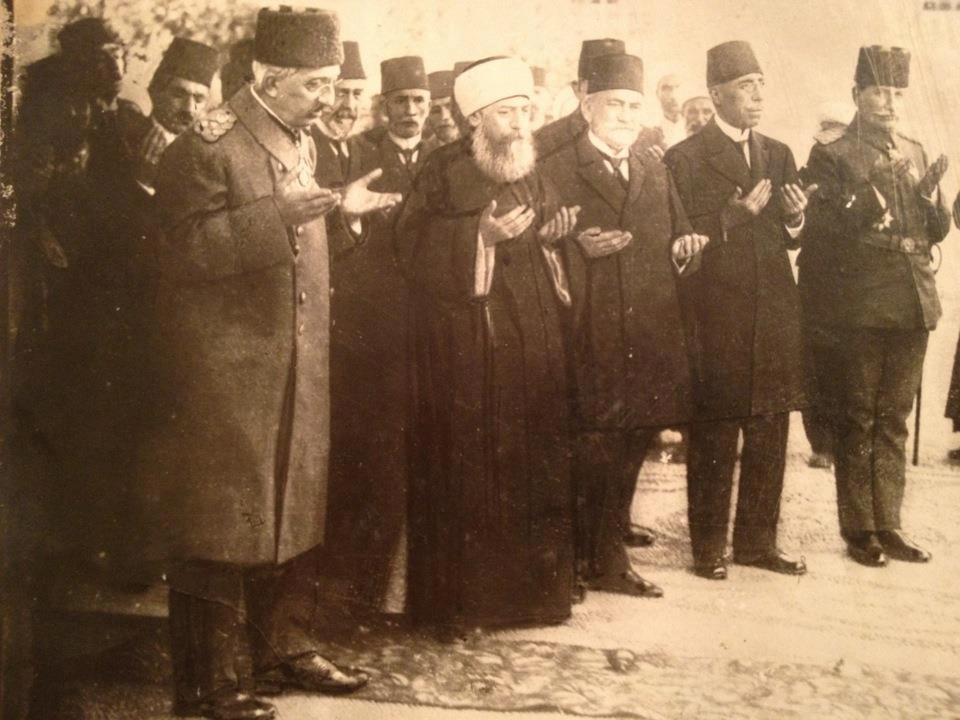
Mehmed VI prays with Shaykh al-Islām Nuri Efendi and Grand Vizier Ahmed Tevfik Pasha before leaving Istanbul, 17 November 1922.

Nuri Efendi was appointed as a Shaykh al-Islam on September 26, 1920, when the government resigned, and was appointed as Sheik al-Islam again on November 4, 1920, when the last Ottoman cabinet was established. He was staunchly against the division of the office of the Caliph and insisted that the office did not just represent the Ottomans but of all Muslims in the world. When the Grand National Assembly of Turkey abolished the Sultanate on November 1, 1922, he resigned together with the last Ottoman government and the office of Shaykh al-Islam ended in its Ottoman form. The post continued in the form of head of the Diyanet (Directorate of Religious Affairs) in the newly formed Republic of Turkey. He was not counted as one of the 150 personae non gratae of Turkey, but his pension was not paid because he had been in the cabinet of Damat Ferit Pasha.

He was the father of three daughters and a son with his wife Şerife Hatice Fehime Hanım. Medeni Mehmet Nuri Efendi died on 29 July 1927 in Ihsaniye, Üsküdar, Istanbul.
