= Ibn Kemal =

Ottoman historian, jurist and poet (1469–1534)

Shaykh al-Islam al-Mu'allim al-Awwal (The First Teacher) Ibn Kemal
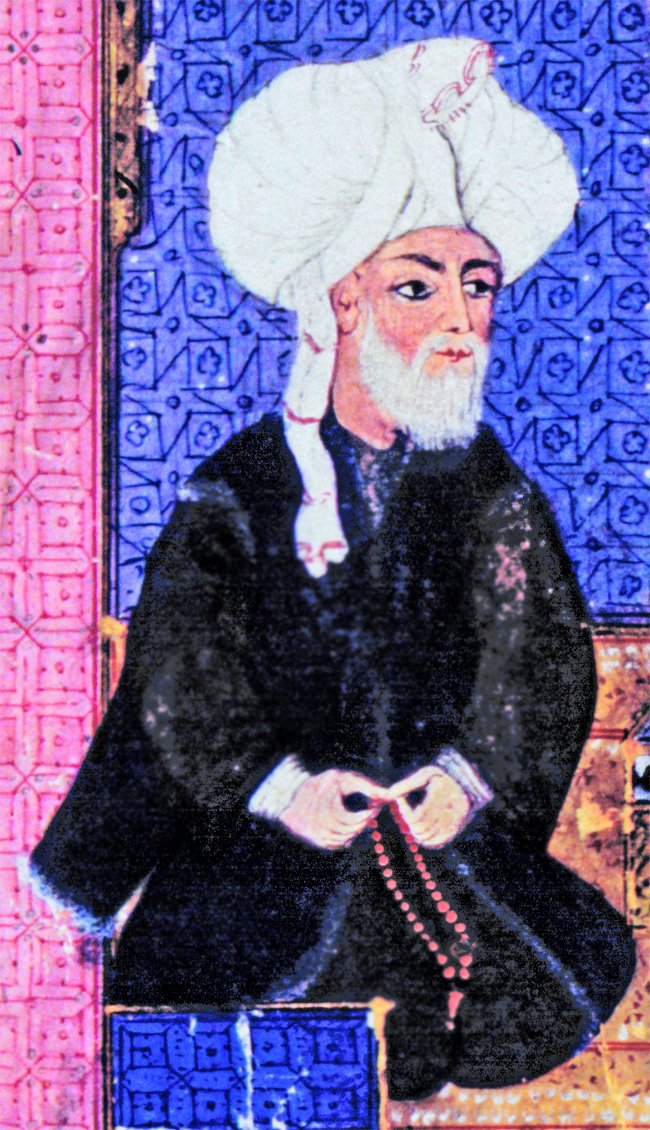
- 16th-century miniature of Ibn Kemal

Personal life
- Born: Şemseddin Ahmed; 1468 Edirne, Rumelia, Ottoman Empire
- Died: 14 April 1534 (aged 65–66) Constantinople, Ottoman Empire
- Era: 15th-century
- Main interest(s): Aqidah, Tafsir, Tasawwuf, Hadith, Fiqh, Usul, Ma'aani, Mantiq, Falsafa, Ottoman history
- Notable work: Tevarih-i Al-i Osman ("The Chronicles of the House of Osman")
- Occupation: Islamic scholar, Historian

Religious life
- Religion: Islam
- Denomination: Sunni
- Jurisprudence: Hanafi
- Creed: Maturidi

Şemseddin Ahmed (1469–1534), better known by his pen name Ibn Kemal (also Ibn Kemal Pasha) or Kemalpaşazâde ("son of Kemal Pasha"), was an Ottoman historian, Shaykh al-Islām, jurist and poet.

He was born into a distinguished military family in Edirne and as a young man he served in the army and later studied at various madrasas and became the Kadı of Edirne in 1515. He had Iranian roots on his mother's side. He became a highly respected scholar and was commissioned by the Ottoman ruler Bayezid II to write an Ottoman history (Tevārīh-i Āl-i Osmān, "The Chronicles of the House of Osman"). During the reign of Selim the Resolute, in 1516, he was appointed as military judge of Anatolia and accompanied the Ottoman army to Egypt. During the reign of Suleiman the Magnificent he was appointed as the Shaykh al-Islām, i.e. supreme head of the ulama, a post which he held until his death.

Kemalpaşazâde was a crucially important figure in the codification of the Hanafi school of thought in its Ottoman iteration.

== Works ==
He "authored around 200 works in Turkish, Persian, and Arabic. His works include commentaries on the Qur'an, treatises on hadith, Islamic law, philosophy and theology (kalam), logic, Sufism, ethics, history, several books on Arabic and Persian grammar, literature, and a small diwan of poetry."

His most famous history work is the Tevārīh-i Āl-i Osmān "The Chronicles of the House of Osman", a history of the Ottoman Empire which provides the most original and important source material now extant on the reigns during which he himself lived.

Although best known as a historian, Kemalpaşazâde was also a great scholar and a talented poet. He wrote numerous scholarly commentaries on the Qur'an, treatises on jurisprudence and Muslim theology and philosophy, and during his stay in Egypt he translated the works of the Egyptian historian ibn Taghribirdi from Arabic. He also wrote in Arabic, a philological work entitled Daqāʿiq al-Haqāʿiq "The Subtleties of Verities". His best poetical works include the Nigaristan "The Picture Gallery", written in Persian and modeled upon the Būstān and the Golestān of Saadi Shirazi; a poem, "Yusuf ü Züleyha", in rhymed couplets, retelling the story of Joseph and Potiphar's wife; and Divān "Collected Poems", consisting mainly of lyrics.

In philosophy and theology, he was a Maturidi theologian-philosopher who followed some opinions of ibn Arabi and anticipated some theories of Mulla Sadra. Kemalpaşazâde also wrote a famous history of the Hanafi school of fiqh entitled Risāla fī Ṭabaqāt al-Mujtahidīn "The Treatise regarding Biographies of Jurists".

== Fatwas against the Safavids ==
As the Ottoman mufti for Sultan Selim I, he wrote fatwas against the Safavid dynasty during the rise of Shah Ismail I. He wrote in his "Risale fî İkfâri Şah İsma‘îl" the reasons for his takfir of Shah Ismail I and his followers, his reasons including:

- He and his followers curse the first three rightly-guided caliphs
- They claim that following the law of the Islamic scholars is difficult, and following the new law of Shah Ismail I is easy
- They revile the four mujtahid Sunni imams
- They claim that what the Shah made lawful is lawful and what he made unlawful is unlawful. (For example) They say that wine is lawful because the Shah made it lawful.

He concluded that "In short, it has been narrated to us through tawatur (consistency) that they are infidels. In this case, we never doubt their unbelief and apostasy." He declared their lands "darul harb", the abode of war, that marriage to them is invalid, their slaughter is impure, and wearing their style of red headgear (they were known for wearing a red cap) is forbidden without necessity.

== Bibliography ==
- Online
- Encyclopædia Britannica
