= Sahn-ı Seman Medrese =

Madrasa in Istanbul, Turkey

The Sahn-ı Seman Medrese or Semâniyye (meaning 'eight courtyards') was a 15th-century Ottoman medrese (madrasa) complex in Istanbul, Turkey, which was part of the Fatih Mosque. It was one of the highest educational facilities for various sciences such as theology, law, medicine, astronomy, physics and mathematics, and was founded by the astronomer Ali Qushji who was invited by the Ottoman sultan Fatih Sultan Mehmed to his court in Istanbul.

== History ==
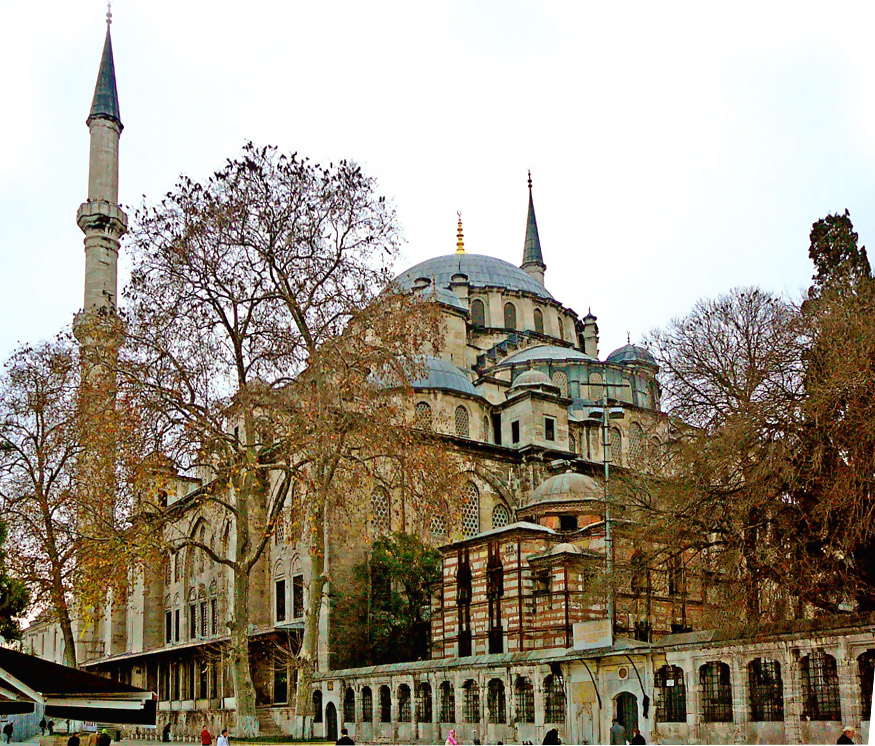
The medreses are visible next to the garden of the Fatih mosque.

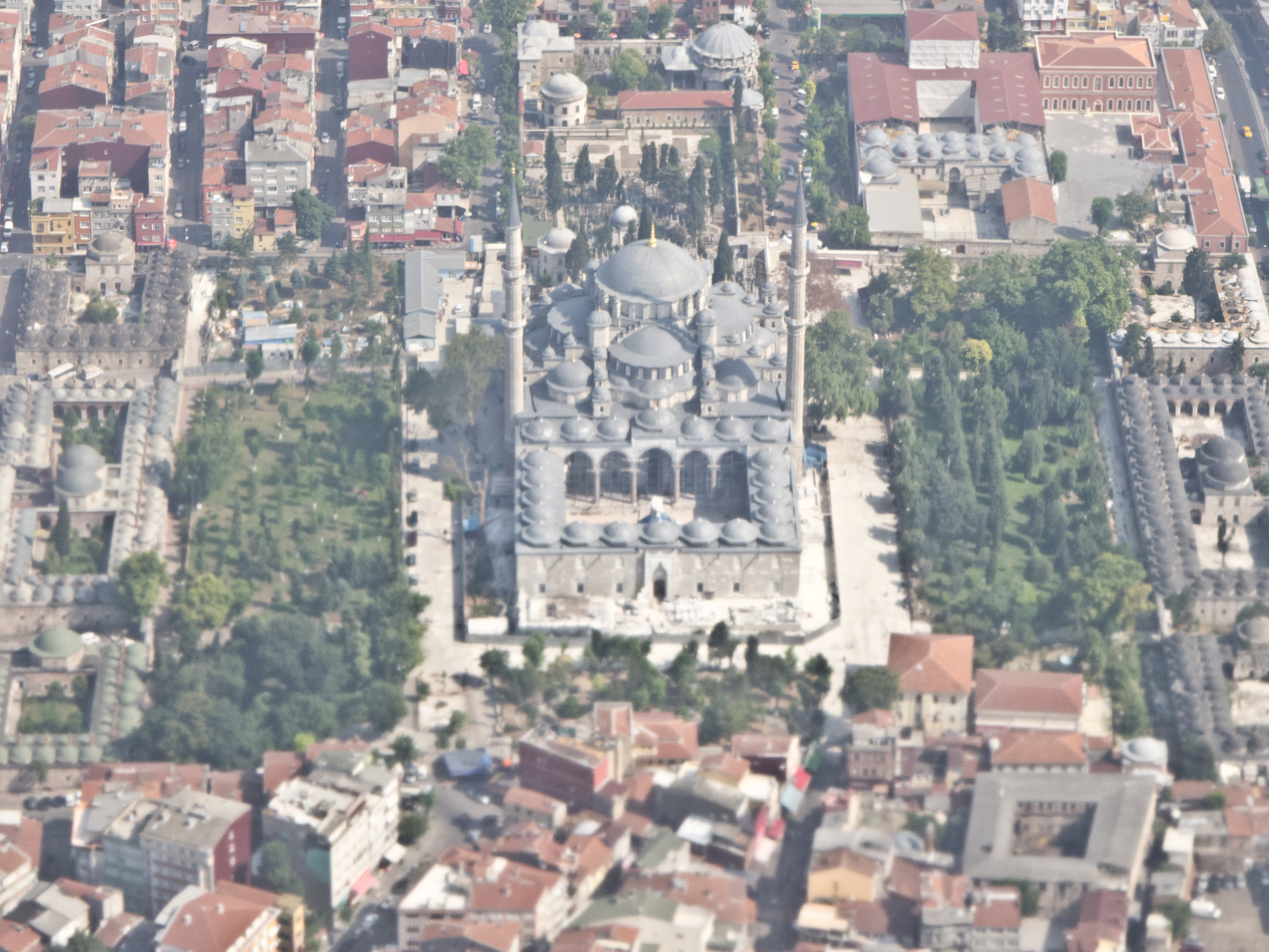
The medreses are visible next to the garden of the Fatih mosque (large building in the middle) as the square courtyard buildings covered by dozens of small domes.

The medrese complex, consisting of eight large and eight smaller (tetimme) medreses, was built by the order of Mehmed II and completed in 1470. Until the construction of the medreses of the Suleymaniye complex (külliye), the Sahn-ı Seman medrese was the most prestigious school in the Ottoman Empire. It was a very large Islamic theological complex, grander in scale and organisation than earlier Ottoman medreses, constructed in the newly conquered (1453) former Byzantine capital city of Constantinople, which became the new Ottoman capital. The goal of the complex was to make the city a center of Islamic science.

The buildings were part of the symmetrical Fatih complex (300 by 300 metres (980 ft × 980 ft)) and are located along the northern and southern sides of the Fatih Mosque. Each medrese has a square plan with 18 cells for students set around a colonnaded courtyard. Each room has a small dome and a fireplace with a chimney. One large domed room was the dershane ('classroom').

Each of the large medreses had a smaller medrese next to it consisting of eight cells for students who received a more elementary education. When the students advanced, they were given a room in the Sahn-ı Seman medrese. Each room was occupied by one or two students. At the eastern side of the complex is a hospital (dârüşşifâ) and a lunatic asylum (tabhâne) with a similar design to the medrese.

The Sahn-i Seman complex had 216 rooms for students, 152 in the large medreses and 64 in the smaller ones.

The medrese complex was a kind of university of its time, with hundreds of Muslim students studying various sciences such as theology, law, medicine, and the rest of the traditional Islamic sciences. The students (called suhte or talebe) trained as scholars or for a career in the Ottoman administration. Graduates could become medrese teachers or kadıs ('judges'). The students were taught by eight teachers (müderris) who received a daily salary of 50 akche until the reign of Bayezid II (forty akche were considered to be roughly equal to a golden ducat at that time). During their studies, which took several years, the students received free accommodation and meals at the imaret (public charity kitchen) of the Fatih complex.

There were eight stages of education. Students from the first seven ranks were called suhte or softa, while those of the highest rank were called danışman ('learned man').

The medrese complex continued in use until 1924 when the new secular government of Turkey passed the Tevhid-i Tedrisat law in an effort to reduce Islamic education. This compelled the closure of all the medreses in Turkey. Today the medrese buildings are in a dilapidated state; four of the smaller ones were completely demolished after World War II to make way for a new road.
