= Müderris =

Müderris is a term that described the religious scholar, professor or faculty member in Seljuk Anatolia and the Ottoman Empire.

In Arabic, the word mudarris means "teacher (of lesson)", describing the teacher and the scholar who is authorized to give lessons. After completing the training in the local schools of the provinces, and after having received the diploma, these scholars would teach religion and sciences in madrasas where they were called müderris. The profession was called müderrislik.

== See also ==
- Ulama
- List of Ottoman titles and appellations
