= Kazasker =

Chief Judge of the Ottoman Empire

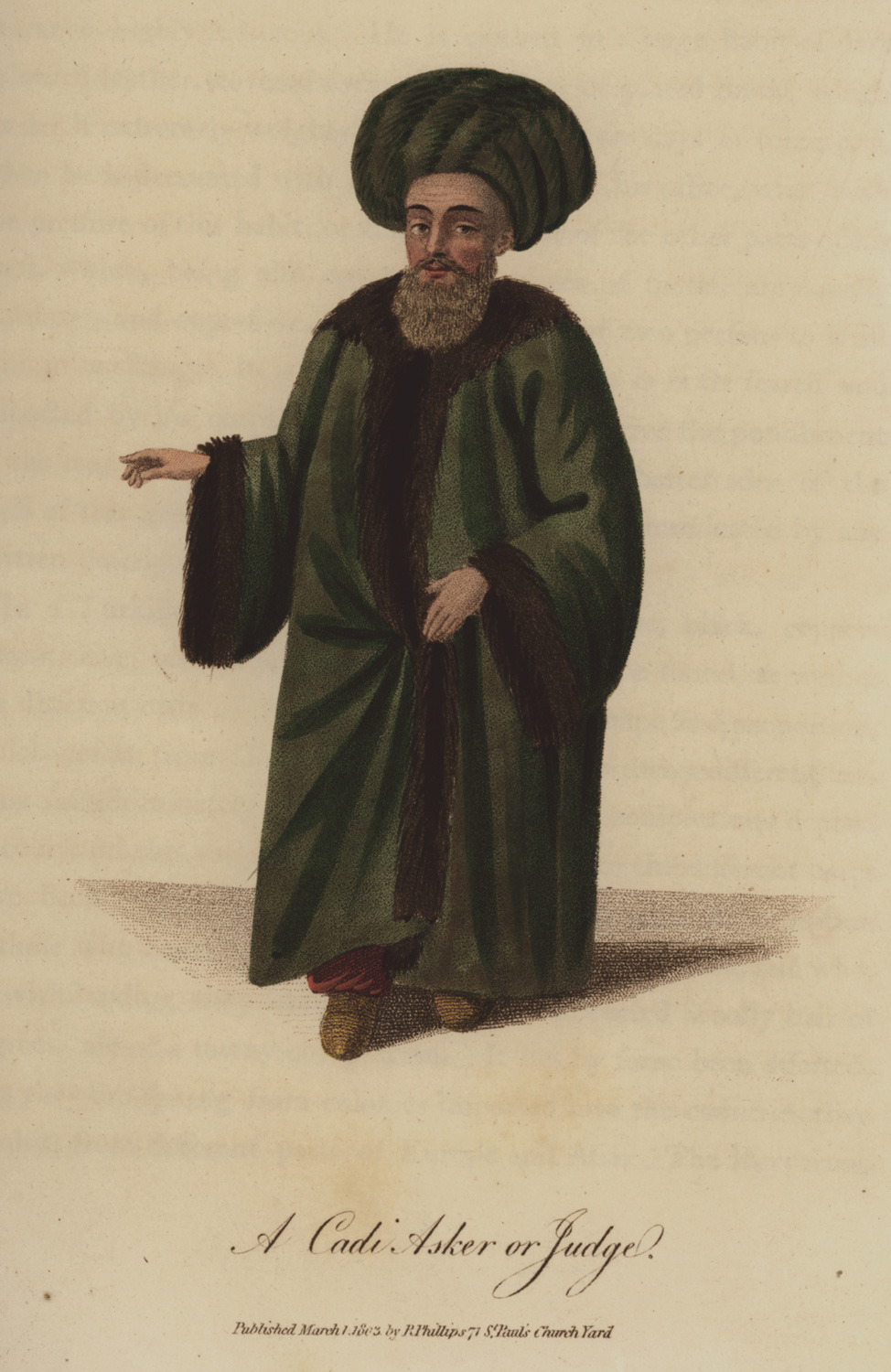
The Kazasker, chief judge of the Ottoman empire, 1799

A kazasker or kadıasker (Ottoman Turkish: قاضی عسكر, ḳāḍī'asker, "military judge") was a chief judge in the Ottoman Empire, so named originally because his jurisdiction extended to the cases of soldiers, who were later tried only by their own officers. Two kazaskers were appointed, called Rumeli Kazaskeri and Anadolu Kazaskeri, having their jurisdiction respectively over the European and the Asiatic part of the Empire. They were subordinated to the Grand Vizier, later Şeyhülislam, and had no jurisdiction over the city of Constantinople. Moreover, they attended the meetings at the Imperial Council.

A Kazasker handled appeals to the decisions of kadı's, had the power to overrule these, and suggested kadı candidates to the Grand Vizier.

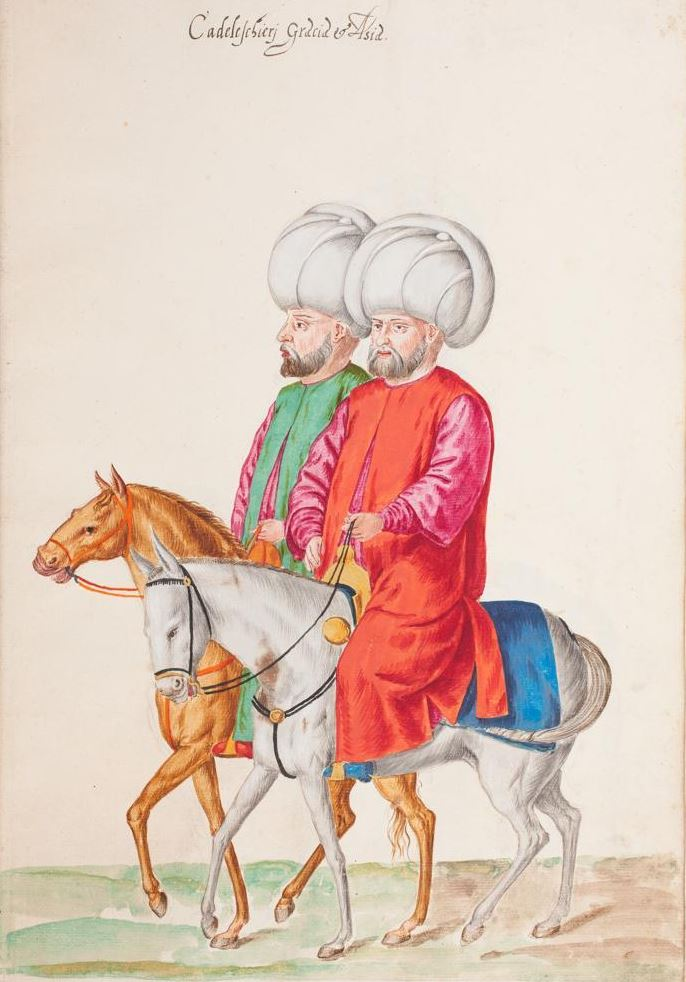
Kazaskers from the Turkish Costume Book by Lambert de Vos, 1574

== See also ==
- Kadı
- List of Ottoman titles and appellations

== Sources ==
- Webster's Revised Unabridged Dictionary, 1913
- Mantran, Robert (1998). La vita quotidiana a Constantinopoli ai tempi di Solimano il Magnifico e dei suoi successori (XVI e XVII secolo) (in Italian) (3 ed.). Milan: Rizzoli.
- E.S. CREASY (1854). HISTORY OF THE OTTOMAN TURKS: FROM THE BEGINNING OF THEIR EMPIRE TO THE PRESENT TIME. Vol. I. London: RICHARD BENTLEY. p. 158.
